= 2012–13 Lebanese Basketball League =

The 2012–2013 season was the 17th edition of the Lebanese Basketball League. The regular season began on Friday, November 2, 2012 and ended on Monday March 4, 2013. The playoffs began on Thursday, March 7 and ended in the Semifinals on Sunday May 26, 2013, after the League got cancelled.

== Teams ==
Team	City	Venue	Head Coach	Past Season
Amchit Club	Amsheet	Amchit Sports Complex	(Italy) Lino Lardo	Promoted from div. 2
Anibal Zahle	Zahlé	SSCC Rassieh	(Lebanon) Dany Ammous	2nd
Antranik SC	Antelias	AGBU	(Lebanon) Rizkallah Zaloum	9th
Bejjeh SC	Bejje	Club Central	(Lebanon) Patrick Saba	7th
Byblos Club	Byblos	Byblos Club	(Lebanon) Joe Moujaes	6th
Champville SC	Dik El Mehdi	Club Mariste	(Lebanon) Ghassan Sarkis	Champions
Hoops Club	Beirut	Michel El Murr	(Syria) Omar Hassino	8th
Mouttahed Tripoli	Tripoli	Safadi Sports Complex	(France) Jean-Denys Choulet	5th
Riyadi Beirut	Beirut	Saeb Salam Complex	(Slovenia) Slobodan Subotic	3rd
Sagesse Beirut	Beirut	Ghazir Club Arena	(Lebanon) Fouad Abou Chacra	4th

== Preseason ==
=== SuperCup ===
Champville SC, winners of the Lebanese Basketball League 2011-2012 defeated Anibal Zahle, winners of the Lebanese Basketball Cup to win The SuperCup.

	Score		
Champville SC	99	83	Anibal Zahle

== Regular season ==
=== Standings ===
#	Team	GP	W	L	FOR	AG	Points
1	Sagesse Beirut	18	16	2	1651	1369	50
2	Riyadi Beirut	18	16	2	1664	1277	50
3	Champville SC	18	12	6	1578	1392	42
4	Mouttahed Tripoli	18	11	7	1602	1443	40
5	Amchit Club	18	11	7	1525	1496	40
6	Byblos Club	18	10	8	1552	1496	38
7	Hoops Club	18	5	13	1461	1656	28
8	Bejjeh SC	18	5	13	1287	1603	28
9	Anibal Zahle	18	2	16	1419	1713	22
10	Antranik SC	18	2	16	1465	1786	22

== Final 8 ==
=== Standings ===
#	Team	GP	W	L	FOR	AG	Points
1	Riyadi Beirut	32	27	5	2841	2366	86
2	Sagesse Beirut	32	25	7	2900	2493	82
3	Mouttahed Tripoli	32	23	9	2778	2507	78
4	Champville SC	32	20	12	2832	2533	72
5	Amchit Club	32	16	16	2647	2679	64
6	Byblos Club	32	14	18	2646	2614	60
7	Hoops Club	32	9	23	2685	2879	50
8	Bejjeh SC	32	8	24	2367	2883	48

== Playoffs ==
Quarterfinals
1	Riyadi Beirut	3
8	Bejjeh SC	0
5	Amchit Club	1
4	Champville SC	3
3	Mouttahed Tripoli	3
6	Byblos Club	2
7	Hoops Club	0
2	Sagesse Beirut	3

Semifinals
1	Riyadi Beirut	1
4	Champville SC	2
3	Mouttahed Tripoli	1
2	Sagesse Beirut	2

Finals

== Statistics leaders ==
Category	Player	Team	Statistic
Points per game	Andre Emmett	Amchit Club	34.4
Rebounds per game	Michael Fraser	Byblos Club	16.9
Assists per game	Corey Williams	Bejjeh SC	6.7
Steals per game	Larry Blair	Hoops Club	3.2
Blocks per game	Loren Woods	Riyadi Beirut	2.5
Turnovers per game	Corey Williams	Bejjeh SC	4.4
3FG%	Amir Saoud	Riyadi Beirut	45.1%
FT%	Jean AbdelNour	Riyadi Beirut	82.3%
Total 3 points	Aaron Harper	Sagesse Beirut	101
Total FT	Michael Fraser	Byblos Club	236

== Awards ==
- Player of the Year: Andre Emmett, Amchit Club
- Guard of the Year: Jasmon Youngblood, Byblos Club
- Forward of the Year: Andre Emmett, Amchit Club
- Center of the Year: Michael Fraser, Byblos Club
- Newcomer of the Year: Julian Khazzouh, Sagesse Beirut
- Import of the Year: Andre Emmett, Amchit Club
- Domestic Player of the Year: Fadi El Khatib, Champville SC
- Defensive Player of the Year: Loren Woods, Riyadi Beirut
- Coach of the Year:
- First Team:
  - G: Jasmon Youngblood, Byblos Club
  - F; Andre Emmett, Amchit Club
  - F: Fadi El Khatib, Champville SC
  - F: Julian Khazzouh, Sagesse Beirut
  - F/C: Michael Fraser, Byblos Club
- Second Team:
  - PG: Rodrigue Akl, Sagesse Beirut
  - G: Eric Chatfield, Mouttahed Tripoli
  - F/G: Jean AbdelNour, Riyadi Beirut
  - F/C: Bassel Bawji, Mouttahed Tripoli
  - C: DeShawn Sims, Sagesse Beirut
