= Basketball in Lebanon =

Basketball is one of the most popular sports in Lebanon. The Lebanese Basketball Federation FLB is a member of the Asian federation FIBA Asia and international federation FIBA and also a member of the Arab Basketball Federation.

== History ==
The first time basketball was played was in the mid of 1920's.The Lebanon national basketball team has qualified three consecutive times to the FIBA World Championship in 2002, 2006, 2010 and 2023. The Lebanese national basketball team won the 2010 FIBA Asia Stanković Cup on its home court. They are ranked 24th in the world. The women national team is ranked 61st in the world and currently plays Level I in the FIBA Asia Championship for Women . The Lebanese u-19 national team participated in the 2007 FIBA Under-19 World Championship where they placed 14th.

== Lebanese Basketball League ==
Lebanon's basketball league is the Lebanese Basketball League and there is also a cup competition.

The most successful men's basketball clubs are Sporting Al Riyadi Beirut and Sagesse – who contest the Beirut derby – having both won the most championships in the Lebanese Basketball League, also the Arab Club Championship, WABA Champions Cup and FIBA Asia Champions Cup.

For women, Antranik SC is the most successful, having won the Lebanese Basketball League, Arab Women's Club Basketball Championship and the WABA Champions Cup.

== Famous Lebanese basketball players ==
- Fadi El Khatib
- Rony Seikaly
- Joe Vogel
- Jean Abdelnour
- Amir Saoud
- Chantelle Anderson
- Wael Arakji
- Brian Beshara
- Rony Fahed
- Matt Freije
- Elie Mechantaf
- Jackson Vroman
- Ghaleb Rida
- Omar El Turk
- Roy Samaha
- Sabah Khoury
- Elie Rustom
- Daniel Faris
- Rodrigue Akl
- Julian Khazzouh
- Ahmad Ibrahim

== Famous Lebanese basketball coaches ==
- Ghassan Sarkis

== FIBA ASIA Champions Cup ==
Sagesse have won a record of 3 FIBA Asia Champions Cup. In addition, their rivals, Al Riyadi also have won 3 FIBA Asia Champions Cups making a total of 6 cups for Lebanon.

== See also ==
- Lebanese Basketball League
- Lebanon national basketball team
