= 2013–14 Lebanese Basketball League =

Lebanese Basketball League season

The 2013–2014 season was the 18th edition of the Lebanese Basketball League. The regular season began on Friday, January 31, 2014, and ended on Saturday April 19, 2014. The playoffs began on Friday, April 25 and ended with the 2014 Finals on Tuesday June 17, 2014, after Riyadi Beirut defeated Sagesse Beirut in 6 games to win their ninth title (new format).

== Regular season ==
=== Standings ===
#	Team	GP	W	L	FOR	AG	Points
1	Riyadi Beirut	18	14	4	1386	1209	46
2	Sagesse Beirut	18	14	4	1556	1366	46
3	Amchit Club	18	14	4	1654	1471	46
4	Byblos Club	18	11	7	1425	1300	40
5	Mouttahed Tripoli	18	11	7	1449	1344	40
6	Homenetmen Beirut	18	10	8	1343	1367	38
7	Tadamon Zouk Mikael	18	6	12	1399	1492	30
8	Champville SC	18	6	12	1338	1455	30
9	Hoops Club	18	2	16	1284	1541	22
10	Bejjeh SC	18	2	16	1323	1612	22

== Playoffs ==
=== Brackets ===
Quarterfinals
1	Riyadi Beirut	3
8	Champville SC	1
5	Mouttahed Tripoli	2
4	Byblos Club	3
3	Amchit Club	3
6	Homenetmen Beirut	0
7	Tadamon Zouk Mikael	0
2	Sagesse Beirut	3

Semifinals
1	Riyadi Beirut	3
4	Byblos Club	0
3	Amchit Club	0
2	Sagesse Beirut	3

Finals
1	Riyadi Beirut	4
4	Sagesse Beirut	2

== Statistics Leaders ==
Category	Player	Team	Statistic
Points per game	Dion Dixon	Homenetmen Beirut	23.9
Rebounds per game	Hassan Whiteside	Mouttahed Tripoli	14.8
Assists per game	Corey Williams	Mouttahed Tripoli	8.1
Steals per game	Jeremiah Massey	Amchit Club	2.9
Blocks per game	Hassan Whiteside	Mouttahed Tripoli	4.1
Turnovers per game	Georgi Tsintsadze	Champville SC	4.6
Total 3 points	Elie Stephan	Sagesse Beirut	77

== Awards ==
- Finals MVP: Ismail Ahmad, Riyadi Beirut
- Player of the Year: Dion Dixon, Homenetmen Beirut
- Guard of the Year: Dion Dixon, Homenetmen Beirut
- Forward of the Year: Fadi El Khatib, Amchit Club
- Center of the Year: Hassan Whiteside, Mouttahed Tripoli
- Newcomer of the Year: Dion Dixon, Homenetmen Beirut
- Import of the Year: Dion Dixon, Homenetmen Beirut
- Domestic Player of the Year: Fadi El Khatib, Amchit Club
- Defensive Player of the Year: Jeremiah Massey, Amchit Club
- Coach of the Year: Fouad Abou Chakra, Sagesse Beirut
- First Team:
  - PG: Dion Dixon, Homenetmen Beirut
  - F/G: Fadi El Khatib, Amchit Club
  - F: Jeremiah Massey, Amchit Club
  - F/C: Vladan Vukosavljević, Champville SC
  - C: Hassan Whiteside, Mouttahed Tripoli
- Second Team:
  - PG: Rodrigue Akl, Sagesse Beirut
  - G: Corey Williams, Mouttahed Tripoli
  - G: Jasmon Youngblood, Byblos Club
  - F/C: Ismail Ahmad, Riyadi Beirut
  - C: Chris Daniels, Sagesse Beirut
