= 2009–10 Lebanese Basketball League =

The 2009-2010 season was the 14th edition of the Lebanese Basketball League. The regular season began on Friday, December 11, 2009 and ended on Thursday April 15, 2010. The playoffs began on Monday, April 19 and ended with the 2010 Finals on Thursday April 29, 2010, after Riyadi Beirut defeated Champville SC in 3 games to win their seventh title (new format).

== Regular season ==
=== Standings ===
#	Team	GP	W	L	Points
1	Champville SC	14	12	2	38
2	Riyadi Beirut	14	12	2	38
3	Mouttahed Tripoli	14	9	5	32
4	Hoops Club	14	9	5	32
5	Sagesse Beirut	14	5	9	24
6	Kahraba Zouk Mikael	14	4	10	22
7	Anibal Zahle	14	3	11	20
8	Antranik SC	14	2	12	18

=== Stage 2 ===
#	Team	GP	W	L	Points
1	Riyadi Beirut	24	21	3	66
2	Champville SC	24	18	6	60
3	Hoops Club	24	15	9	54
4	Mouttahed Tripoli	24	14	10	52
5	Sagesse Beirut	24	9	15	42
6	Kahraba Zouk Mikael	24	4	20	32

== Playoffs ==
=== Brackets ===
Semifinals
1	Riyadi Beirut	3
4	Mouttahed Tripoli	1
3	Hoops Club	0
2	Champville SC	3

Finals
1	Riyadi Beirut	3
2	Champville SC	0

== Statistics leaders ==
Category	Player	Team	Statistic
Points per game	Fadi El Khatib	Champville SC	29.6
Rebounds per game	Malcolm Battles	Kahraba Zouk Mikael	14.3
Assists per game	Sean Colson	Antranik SC	9.0
Steals per game	Enrique Clemons	Hoops Club	4.6
Blocks per game	Christien Charles	Champville SC	3.2

== Awards ==
- Player of the Year: Chester Jarell Giles, Riyadi Beirut
- Guard of the Year: Ali Mahmoud, Riyadi Beirut
- Forward of the Year: William Byrd, Hoops Club
- Center of the Year: Chester Jarell Giles, Riyadi Beirut
- Newcomer of the Year: Amir Saoud, Hoops Club
- Import of the Year: Chester Jarell Giles, Riyadi Beirut
- Domestic Player of the Year: Fadi El Khatib, Champville SC
- Defensive Player of the Year: Ghaleb Rida, Champville SC
- First Team:
  - G: Ali Mahmoud, Riyadi Beirut
  - F: Elie Rustom, Mouttahed Tripoli
  - F: Fadi El Khatib, Champville SC
  - F: William Byrd, Hoops Club
  - F/C: Chester Jarell Giles, Riyadi Beirut
- Second Team:
  - G: Enrique Clemons, Hoops Club
  - G: Ghaleb Rida, Champville SC
  - G: Omar El Turk, Riyadi Beirut
  - F/C: Bassem Balaa, Mouttahed Tripoli
  - C: Joe Vogel, Riyadi Beirut

== Lebanese Basketball Cup ==
Champville SC defeated Sagesse Beirut in the finals of the Lebanese Basketball Cup

	Score		
Champville SC	95	63	Sagesse Beirut
