= 2024–25 Lebanese Basketball League =

2024–25 LBL season
- League: Lebanese Basketball League
- Duration: 1 February 2025 - 11 July 2025
- Teams: 12

Regular Season
- Season champions: Al Riyadi
- Runners-up: Sagesse SC
- Third place: Beirut Club

Finals
- Champions: Al Riyadi
- Runners-up: Sagesse SC

Seasons
- ← 2023–24 2025–26 →

Organized by the Lebanese Basketball Federation, the tournament will bring together the nation's top teams in an intense battle for the championship title. The league serves as a key event in Lebanon's sporting calendar, showcasing local talent and contributing to the development of basketball in the country.

== Delayed start due to regional conflict ==
Originally scheduled to begin in November 2024, the tournament faced an unprecedented delay due to the Israel-Lebanon conflict that erupted in October and lasted through November. The Lebanese Basketball Federation rescheduled the tournament's start date to February 1, 2025.

== Teams ==
| Team | City | Arena | Coach | Capacity |
|---|---|---|---|---|
| Al Riyadi | Beirut (Manara) | Saeb Salam Arena (Manara) | Ahmad Farran | 2,500 |
| Antranik | Antelias | AGBU Demirdjian Center (Naccache) | Georges Akiki | 2,000 |
| Antonine | Baabda | Antonine Arena (Baabda) | Ralf Akl | 1,000 |
| Beirut First | Beirut (Chiyah) | Chiyah Stadium (Chiyah) | Jad Al Hajj | 2,000 |
| Champville-Maristes | Dik El Mehdi | Champville School Stadium (Dik El Mehdi) | Sabah Khoury | 750 |
| Homenetmen | Mezher | Homentmen Mezher (Mezher) | Joe Moujaes | 1,000 |
| Hoops Club | Jdeideh | Rockland Arena (Bourj El Barajne) | Gilbert Nasr | 1,750 |
| Mayrouba Club | Mayrouba | Nouhad Naufal Stadium (Zouk Mikael) | Paul Coughter | 6,000 |
| NSA | Jounieh | Fouad Chehab Stadium (Jounieh) | George Khoury | 1,230 |
| Sagesse | Ghazir | Antoine Choueiri Stadium (Ghazir) | Ilias Zouros | 5,000 |
| Tadamon Hrajel | Hrajel | Nouhad Naufal Stadium (Zouk Mikael) | Ghassan Sarkis | 6,000 |
| Central Club | Jounieh | Club Central Court (Jounieh) | Marwan Khalil | 1,000 |

Coaching Changes

| Team | Transfer out | Transfer in |
|---|---|---|
| Sagesse | George Geagea | Ilias Zouros |
| Tadamon Hrajel | Elie Nasr | Ghassan Sarkis |
| Sagesse | Ilias Zouros | Linos Gavriel |

Source: Asia-Basket

== Groups ==
| Pos | Team | Pld | W | L | Pts | Qualification | RYD | BF | SAG | ANT | HOM | ATK | CEN | CHA | HOO | TAD | MAY | NSA |
|---|---|---|---|---|---|---|---|---|---|---|---|---|---|---|---|---|---|---|
| 1 | Al Riyadi | 22 | 21 | 1 | 43 | Semi-finals | — | 86–92 | 99–92 | 99–72 | 110–86 | 103–85 | 104–89 | 110–68 | 103–72 | 136–76 | 105–75 | 95–79 |
| 2 | Beirut First | 22 | 19 | 3 | 41 | Semi-finals | 72–110 | — | 90–86 | 84–71 | 109–105 | 76–68 | 101–91 | 103–97 | 82–80 | 91–63 | 83–66 | 90–70 |
| 3 | Sagesse | 22 | 17 | 5 | 39 | Semi-finals | 97–105 | 84–93 | — | 101–80 | 100–99 | 97–78 | 118–88 | 97–89 | 110–107 | 94–89 | 93–74 | 97–106 |
| 4 | Antonine | 22 | 11 | 11 | 33 | Quarter-finals | 73–100 | 92–95 | 84–98 | — | 107–84 | 86–78 | 89–59 | 79–90 | 82–80 | 102–81 | 84–77 | 100–64 |
| 5 | Homenetmen | 22 | 11 | 11 | 33 | Quarter-finals | 69–96 | 80–82 | 114–102 | 84–101 | — | 97–94 | 100–82 | 96–112 | 105–126 | 83–82 | 88–96 | 104–100 |
| 6 | Antranik | 22 | 9 | 13 | 31 | | 89–92 | 82–85 | 87–92 | 79–72 | 79–83 | — | 78–71 | 83–60 | 70–88 | 80–88 | 97–100 | 82–69 |
| 7 | Central Club | 22 | 9 | 13 | 31 | | 79–116 | 80–81 | 66–93 | 73–67 | 92–99 | 85–77 | — | 72–71 | 71–69 | 105–82 | 88–97 | 97–93 |
| 8 | Champville-Maristes | 22 | 9 | 13 | 31 | | 77–114 | 97–89 | 68–97 | 98–88 | 86–100 | 89–91 | 79–85 | — | 90–83 | 115–97 | 78–74 | 86–68 |
| 9 | Hoops Club | 22 | 9 | 13 | 31 | Relegation Playoffs | 84–86 | 94–88 | 79–85 | 68–77 | 190–81 | 80–88 | 85–66 | 71–72 | — | 65–78 | 99–51 | 86–77 |
| 10 | Tadamon Hrajel | 22 | 7 | 15 | 29 | Relegation Playoffs | 78–110 | 65–93 | 91–104 | 76–88 | 85–121 | 78–82 | 93–86 | 98–94 | 73–81 | — | 94–76 | 80–74 |
| 11 | Mayrouba Club | 22 | 7 | 15 | 29 | Relegation Playoffs | 65–117 | 76–95 | 83–100 | 98–107 | 104–95 | 84–88 | 85–103 | 106–91 | 74–96 | 87–83 | — | 95–70 |
| 12 | NSA | 22 | 3 | 19 | 25 | Relegation Playoffs | 75–102 | 83–93 | 71–81 | 88–80 | 81–83 | 82–96 | 73–81 | 85–78 | 81–85 | 93–98 | 76–85 | — |

Source: Flashscore

== Playoffs ==
=== Championship finals ===
Quarterfinals; Best-of-3
4th | Antonine | 0
5th | Homenetmen | 2

Semifinals; Best-of-5
1st | Al Riyadi | 3
QF | Homenetmen | 0
2nd | Beirut First | 2
3rd | Sagesse | 3

Finals; Best-of-7
SF1 | Al Riyadi | 4
SF2 | Sagesse | 1

Source: Flashscore - Lebanon Division 1 - Championship Finals 2025

=== Relegation playoffs ===
Round 1 Best-of-1
Winner Saved / Loser Advances
9th | Hoops Club | 1
10th | Tadamon Hrajel | 0
Winner Advances / Loser Relegated
11th | Mayrouba Club | 0
12th | NSA | 1

Round 2 Best-of-1
Winner Saved / Loser Relegated
SF1 | Tadamon Hrajel | 0
SF2 | NSA | 1

Result: Mayrouba Club & Tadamon Hrajel relegated for the 2025-26 season.

Source: Flashscore - Lebanon Division 1 - Relegation Playoffs 2025
