= 2010–11 Lebanese Basketball League =

The 2010–2011 season was the 15th edition of the Lebanese Basketball League. The regular season began on Thursday, October 28, 2010 and ended on Wednesday April 13, 2012. The playoffs began on Sunday, April 17 and ended with the 2011 Finals on Sunday May 8, 2011, after Riyadi Beirut defeated Champville SC in 3 games to win their eight title (new format).

== Teams ==
Team	City	Venue	Head coach	Past Season
Anibal	Zahlé	SSCC Rassieh	(Serbia) Tony Vujanic	7th
Antranik SC	Antelias	AGBU Demirdjian Center	(United States) Aaron Mitchel	8th
Byblos Club	Byblos	Amsheet Sport Complex	(Lebanon) Joe Moujaes	Promoted from div. 2
Champville SC	Dik El Mehdi	Club Mariste	(Lebanon) Ghassan Sarkis	2nd
Haouch El Oumara	Zahlé	Antonine Ksara Court	(Serbia) Radenko Orlovic	Promoted from div. 2
Hoops Club	Beirut	Michel El Murr	(Argentina) Fecundo Petracci	3rd
Kahraba (withdrew)	Zouk	Kahraba Zouk Sports Complex		6th
Mouttahed Tripoli	Tripoli	Safadi Sports Complex	(United States) Paul Caughter	4th
Riyadi	Beirut	Saeb Salam Complex	(Lebanon) Fouad Abou Chacra	Champions
Sagesse	Ghazir	Ghazir Club Arena	(United States) Tab Baldwin	5th

== Preseason ==
=== Supercup ===
Champville SC, winners of the Lebanese Basketball Cup defeated Riyadi Beirut, winners of the Lebanese Basketball League 2009–2010 to win The SuperCup.

	Score		
Riyadi Beirut	72	76	Champville SC

== Regular season ==
=== Standings ===
#	Team	Pld	W	L	PF	PA	PD	Pts
1	Riyadi Beirut	30	24	6	2542	2188	+354	78
2	Champville SC	30	22	8	2387	2161	+226	74
3	Mouttahed Tripoli	30	21	9	2486	2283	+203	72
4	Sagesse Beirut	30	20	10	2322	2162	+160	70
5	Anibal Zahle	30	15	15	2221	2201	+20	60
6	Hoops Club	30	11	19	2126	2200	-74	52
7	Byblos Club	30	7	23	2505	2789	-284	44
8	Antranik SC	30	6	24	2304	2639	-335	42
9	Chabibet Haouch El Oumara	16	2	14	1138	1408	-270	20
10	Kahraba Zouk Mikael (withdrew)							

- teams highlighted in green means qualified for the final 4

== Playoffs ==
Semifinals
1	Riyadi	3
4	Sagesse	0
2	Champville	3
3	Mouttahed	1

Finals
1	Riyadi	3
2	Champville	0

== Statistics leaders ==
Category	Player	Team	Statistic
Points per game	Fadi El Khatib	Champville SC	27.3
Rebounds per game	Loren Woods	Riyadi Beirut	14.3
Assists per game	Willie Bannister	Antranik SC	7.0
Steals per game	Enrique Clemons	Chabibet Haouch El Oumara	3.2
Blocks per game	Darnell Cox	Champville SC	3.7

== Awards ==
- Player of the Year: Nathanel Johnson, Riyadi Beirut
- Guard of the Year: Austin Johnson, Mouttahed Tripoli
- Forward of the Year: Nathanel Johnson, Riyadi Beirut
- Center of the Year: Loren Woods, Riyadi Beirut
- Newcomer of the Year: Charles Tabet, Anibal Zahle
- Import of the Year: Nathanel Johnson, Riyadi Beirut
- Domestic Player of the Year: Fadi El Khatib, Champville SC
- Defensive Player of the Year: Darnell Cox, Champville SC
- Turning Point Player of the Year: Ismail Ahmad, Riyadi Beirut
- First Team:
  - G: Ali Mahmoud, Riyadi Beirut
  - F: Nathanel Johnson, Riyadi Beirut
  - F: Fadi El Khatib, Champville SC
  - F: Terrence Shannon, Anibal Zahle
  - C: Loren Woods, Riyadi Beirut
- Second Team:
  - G: Rodrigue Akl, Anibal Zahle
  - G: Austin Johnson, Mouttahed Tripoli
  - G: Jasmon Youngblood, Champville SC
  - F: Calvin Warner, Byblos Club
  - C: Darnell Cox, Champville SC
