= 2023–24 Lebanese Basketball League =

2023–24 LBL season
- League: Lebanese Basketball League
- Duration: 26 October 2023 - 20 May 2024
- Teams: 10

Regular Season
- Season champions: Al Riyadi
- Runners-up: Beirut Club
- Third place: Sagesse SC

Finals
- Champions: Al Riyadi
- Runners-up: Sagesse SC

Seasons
- ← 2022–23 2024–25 →

The 2023–24 Lebanese Basketball League, also known as the Division 1, is the 28th season of the Lebanese Basketball League (LBL), the top-tier competition for professional men's teams in Lebanon. The season began on 26 October 2023.

Al Riyadi were the defending champions, having won the previous season.

== Teams ==
The league reduced from 12 to 10 teams, after the withdrawal of Leaders and Dynamo. Byblos Club and Atlas Ferzol left the league, while Mayrouba Club and Antonine joined for this season.

Locations of teams in the Lebanese Basketball League 2023–24

Team	City	Arena	Coach	Capacity
Al Riyadi	Beirut (Manara)	Saeb Salam Arena	Ahmad Farran	2,500
Antranik	Antelias	AGBU Demirdjian Center	Georges Akiki	2,000
Antonine	Baabda	Antonine Arena Baabda	Ralf Akl	1,000
Beirut Club	Beirut (Chiyah)	Chiyah Stadium	Joe Ghattas	2,000
Champville	Dik El Mehdi	Champville Club Center	Sabah Khoury	750
Homenetmen	Mezher	Homentmen Mezher	Joe Moujaes	1,000
Hoops Club	Jdeideh	Michel El Murr Complex	Ziad el Natour	1,750
Mayrouba Club	Mayrouba	Central Arena	Paul Coughter	1,000
NSA	Jounieh	Fouad Chehab Stadium	George Khoury	1,230
Sagesse	Beirut (Achrafieh)	Antoine Choueiri Stadium	Ilias Zouros	5,000

== Regular season ==
Before the season, Dynamo and Leaders announced their withdrawal from the league for financial issues. The season started well for both Riyadi, Beirut and Sagesse. However, after Riyadi's shock loss to Antonine and Sagesse winning against Beirut in one of the most historical games in the league, Sagesse sat alone at the top until week 10, where they lost it after their loss against Antonine 80–79, and Riyadi is now sitting at the top

Pos	2023–24 Lebanese Basketball League regular season							
Pos	Team	Pld	W	L	PF	PA	PD	Status: In progress
1	Al Riyadi	18	15	3	1679	1387	+292	Qualified
2	Beirut Club	18	13	5	1670	1531	+139	Qualified
3	Sagesse SC	18	13	5	1501	1370	+131	Qualified
4	Champville	18	12	6	1500	1478	+22	Qualified
5	Homenetmen	18	12	6	1603	1507	+96	Qualified
6	Antranik	18	8	10	1438	1493	−55	Qualified
7	Antonine	18	8	10	1429	1505	−76	Qualified
8	NSA	18	5	13	1378	1575	−197	Qualified
9	Hoops	18	3	15	1376	1523	−156	
10	Mayrouba	18	1	17	1360	1556	−196	

== Second stage ==
=== Bracket ===
Final 8

(Best of 3)

Final 4

(Best of 5)

Final

(Best of 7)

Al Riyadi
2

NSA
0

Al Riyadi
3

Homenetmen
0

Champville
0

Homenetmen
2

Al Riyadi
4

Sagesse SC
1

Sagesse SC
2

Antranik
0

Sagesse SC
3

Beirut Club
1

Beirut Club
2

Antonine
0
