= 2025–26 Lebanese Basketball League =

2025–26 LBL season
- League: Lebanese Basketball League
- Duration: 18 October 2025 - 3 August 2026
- Teams: 12

Regular Season
- Season champions: Al Riyadi
- Runners-up: Sagesse SC

Finals
- Champions: Al Riyadi
- Runners-up: Sagesse SC

Seasons
- ← 2024–25 2026–27 →

The continuation of the Lebanese Basketball League, organized by the Lebanese Basketball Federation.

== Tournament Hiatus ==
The 2026 Lebanon War (2 March - 22 May 2026) has paused the tournament.

== Teams ==
Team	City	Arena	Coach	Capacity
Al Riyadi	Beirut (Manara)	Saeb Salam Arena (Manara)	Ahmad Farran	2,500
Antranik	Antelias	AGBU Demirdjian Center (Naccache)	Elie Merheb	2,000
Antonine	Baabda	Antonine Arena (Baabda)	Ralf Akl	1,000
Beirut First	Beirut (Chiyah)	Chiyah Stadium (Chiyah)	Marwan Diab	2,000
Champville-Maristes	Dik El Mehdi	Champville School Stadium (Dik El Mehdi)	George Khoury	750
Homenetmen	Mezher	Homentmen Mezher (Mezher)	Joe Moujaes	1,000
Hoops Club	Jdeideh	Rockland Arena (Bourj El Barajne)	Gilbert Nasr	1,750
Chabab Batroun	Batroun	Nouhad Naufal Stadium (Zouk Mikael)	Charbel Feghali	6,000
NSA	Jounieh	Fouad Chehab Stadium (Jounieh)	Marwan Khalil	1,230
Sagesse	Ghazir	Antoine Choueiri Stadium (Ghazir)	Joe Ghattas	5,000
Tadamon Hrajel	Hrajel	Nouhad Naufal Stadium (Zouk Mikael)	Alain Saab	6,000
Central Club	Jounieh	Club Central Court (Jounieh)	George Geagea	1,000

Coaching Changes

Team	Transfer out	Transfer in
Beirut First	Jad Al Hajj	Marwan Diab
Tadamon Hrajel	Ghassan Sarkis	Alain Saab
Champville-Maristes	Alan Abaz	George Khoury

Source:Asia Basket-Lebanon

== Groups ==
Pos	Team	Pld	W	L	Pts	Qualification	RYD	SAG	HOO	ANT	ATK	CEN	HOM	BF	BAT	NSA	CHA	TAD
1	Al Riyadi	22	21	1	43	Final 8 Playoffs	—	122–114	103–73	104–97	107–86	85–74	118–97	96–73	81–72	99–80	84–78	118–83
2	Sagesse	22	18	4	40	Final 8 Playoffs	86–94	—	94–100	114–113	90–80	99–73	131–120	89–79	108–65	112–72	114–95	108–94
3	Hoops Club	22	14	8	36	Final 8 Playoffs	81–105	74–97	—	87–80	88–89	93–87	94–87	88–86	75–83	91–80	90–61	89–57
4	Antonine	22	13	9	35	Final 8 Playoffs	100–108	91–95	77–75	—	82–99	85–77	91–95	80–74	102–65	93–90	95–98	95–49
5	Antranik	22	13	9	35	Final 8 Playoffs	86–106	95–114	82–97	82–83	—	90–83	62–71	95–70	83–69	104–94	116–73	92–79
6	Central Club	22	13	9	35	Final 8 Playoffs	90–96	100–95	82–85	78–89	85–81	—	105–96	73–83	98–88	109–79	92–79	103–65
7	Homenetmen	22	11	11	33	Final 8 Playoffs	126–125	87–89	90–80	113–107	89–97	94–103	—	104–99	96–90	100–92	105–97	96–82
8	Beirut First	22	10	12	32	Final 8 Playoffs	102–121	100–110	81–70	77–81	62–53	79–81	107–88	—	99–73	92–97	109–77	106–77
9	Chabab Batroun	22	7	15	29	Relegation Playoffs	73–105	82–84	67–70	83–89	87–90	59–76	82–74	97–83	—	90–83	92–80	89–82
10	NSA	22	6	16	28	Relegation Playoffs	90–107	106–114	82–85	77–84	55–69	64–96	104–94	88–98	91–79	—	94–84	92–86
11	Champville-Maristes	22	5	17	27	Relegation Playoffs	92–121	87–95	55–111	74–106	78–94	76–117	116–89	80–87	106–84	103–86	—	81–97
12	Tadamon Hrajel	22	1	21	23	Relegation Playoffs	87–104	87–99	79–89	54–88	76–111	70–93	61–98	67–91	66–103	77–87	83–89	—

Source: Flashscore

== Playoffs ==
=== Championship Playoffs ===
Quarterfinals; Best-of-5
1st	Al Riyadi	3
8th	Beirut First	0
4th	Antonine	3
5th	Antranik	0
2nd	Sagesse	3
7th	Homenetmen	0
3rd	Hoops Club	0
6th	Central Club	3

Semifinals; Best-of-5
1st	Al Riyadi	3
4th	Antonine	1
2nd	Sagesse	3
6th	Central Club	1

Finals; Best-of-7
1st	Al Riyadi	4
2nd	Sagesse	3

Source: Flashscore - Lebanon Division 1 - Championship Finals 2026

=== Relegation playoffs ===
Round 1 Best-of-3
Winner Saved / Loser Advances
9th	Chabab Batroun	0
10th	NSA	2
Winner Advances / Loser Relegated
11th	Champville-Maristes	0
12th	Tadamon Hrajel	2

Round 2 Best-of-5
Winner Saved / Loser Relegated
9th	Chabab Batroun	2
12th	Tadamon Hrajel	0

Result: Round 2 loser & Round 1 (11th vs 12th) loser relegated for the 2026–27 season.

Source: Flashscore - Lebanon Division 1 - Championship Finals 2026
