= Alpha Bangura =

Libyan basketball player

Personal information
- Born: February 4, 1980 (age 46) Freetown, Sierra Leone
- Listed height: 6 ft 4 in (1.93 m)
- Listed weight: 215 lb (98 kg)

Career information
- High school: Eleanor Roosevelt (Greenbelt, Maryland)
- College: Monmouth (1998–1999); St. John's (2000–2002)
- NBA draft: 2002: undrafted
- Playing career: 2002–2016
- Position: Small forward

Career history
- 2002–2003: North Charleston Lowgators
- 2003–2004: Charleston Lowgators
- 2004–2005: Sioux Falls Skyforce
- 2005: Guaiqueríes de Margarita
- 2005: Benfica
- 2005–2006: Michigan Mayhem
- 2006: Idaho Stampede
- 2006: Unelco Tenerife
- 2006–2007: Aishin Sea Horses
- 2007: Atléticos de San Germán
- 2007–2008: Aishin Sea Horses
- 2008: Sagesse-Al Hekmeh Beirut
- 2008: Al Qadsia
- 2008–2009: Rio Grande Valley Vipers
- 2009: Bakersfield Jam
- 2010: Sporting Al Riyadi Beirut
- 2010–2011: Anibal Zahle
- 2011: Air21 Express
- 2015–2016: Incheon Electroland Elephants

Career highlights
- JBL champion (2008); NEC Newcomer of the Year (1999); 2x CBA All-Star Game (2005, 2006)

Alpha Mohamed Bangura (born February 4, 1980) is a Libyan-Sierra Leonean former professional basketball player who competed as a member of the Libya national basketball team at the FIBA Africa Championship 2009.

== Amateur career ==
Bangura is a graduate of Eleanor Roosevelt High School in Greenbelt, Maryland, where he was teammates with fellow professional basketball players Delonte Holland and Eddie Basden.

Alpha Bangura played NCAA basketball at St. John's University for two years after starting his career at Monmouth University, where he averaged 18.9 points per game as a freshman and earned newcomer of the year. Bangura moved to St. John's after one season at Monmouth to play for coach Mike Jarvis. In 2002, he left the team for unknown reasons.

== Professional ==
Following his college career, Bangura played professional basketball in the United States with the CBA and USBL and overseas in Portugal, Israel, Spain, Japan, Puerto Rico, Lebanon, Kuwait, Venezuela, and in the Philippines for the Air21 Express. In 2008–09, Bangura spent most of the year with the Rio Grande Valley Vipers of the D-League, averaging 18.9 points per game over 26 games before being traded to the Bakersfield Jam for the last nine games of the season. In 2010, he signed with Sporting Al Riyadi Beirut playing his first match in the league against runners-up Al Mouttahed Tripoli. He signed for Anibal Zahle in the Lebanese Basketball League for the 2010–11 season. He played his first game against his former team Sagesse.

He was signed by the Air21 Express as their second import for the 2011 PBA Commissioner's Cup. He led the team to the semi-finals while averaging 28 points per game after beating the Alaska Aces, 2–1.

Bangura was signed to the Washington Wizards in 2004. He has also had stints with the Golden State Warriors, Los Angeles Clippers and Orlando Magic.

== International ==
Bangura was the most consistent member of the Libyan team that finished 11th as the host country in the 2009 FIBA Africa Championship. He averaged 24.4 points per game over six games for the Libyans before his team failed to qualify to the next round. Bangura scored a game-high 25 points and grabbed seven rebounds in the opening game against South Africa to send the Libyans into the eighth finals. Bangura again scored a game-high 23 points in a two-point Libyan victory over Egypt in the eighth finals, its only victory in that round.
