= 2022–23 Lebanese Basketball League =

2022–23 LBL season
- League: Lebanese Basketball League
- Duration: 2 October 2022 – 29 May 2023
- Teams: 12

Regular Season
- Season champions: Dynamo
- Runners-up: Sagesse
- Third place: Beirut Club

Finals
- Champions: Al Riyadi
- Runners-up: Dynamo

Seasons
- ← 2021–22 2023–24 →

The 2022–23 Lebanese Basketball League, also known as the Division 1, is the 27th season of the Lebanese Basketball League (LBL), the top-tier competition for professional men's teams in Lebanon. The season began on 2 October 2022.

Beirut were the defending champions, having won the previous season. They finished fourth in the season, after losing to Sagesse 82–73 for 3rd place.

== Teams ==
The league expanded from ten to twelve teams. Moutahed left the league, while Antranik, NSA and Leaders Club joined for this season.

Locations of teams in the Lebanese Basketball League 2021–22

Team	City	Arena	Coach	Capacity
Al Riyadi	Beirut (Manara)	Saeb Salam Arena	Ahmad Farran	2,500
Antranik	Antelias	AGBU Demirdjian Center	Sabah Khoury	2,000
Atlas	Ferzol	St Joseph des Soeurs Antonines Arena Zahleh	Elie Nasr	2,000
Beirut Club	Beirut (Chiyah)	Chiyah Stadium	Ahmad Yammout	2,000
Byblos Club	Byblos	Michel Sleiman Sports Village	Georges Yaacoub	1,500
Champville	Dik El Mehdi	Champville Club Center		750
Dynamo	Beirut (Saifi Village)	Rockland Arena	Jad el Hajj	1,000
Homenetmen	Mezher	Homentmen Mezher	Joe Moujaes	1,000
Hoops Club	Jdeideh	Michel El Murr Complex	Ziad el Natour	1,750
Leaders Club	Zouk Mosbeh	Louaize Stadium		1,000
NSA	Jounieh	Fouad Chehab Stadium		1,230
Sagesse	Beirut (Achrafieh)	Antoine Choueiri Stadium	Joe Ghattas	5,000

== Regular season ==
Before the season, Champville rebranded as Maristes due to a conflict between the school and the club. Also losing their homecourt, Maristes used the Central Court in Jounieh before using the Antoine Choueiri Stadium in Ghazir as homecourt.

Sagesse and Dynamo fought for the season lead before Dynamo stayed there after their home win against Sagesse. Beirut finished third after defeating Riyadi 105–99 at Riyadi's home court and the latter settled for fourth.

Leaders finished 5th due to their face-to-face advantage against Maristes who finished 6th.

Hoops finished 7th being the only team not in the top 4 to end the regular season with a positive point difference.

Homenetmen finished 8th in the last game after a crucial win against Antranik who also fought for 8th. Coach Marwan Khalil transformed Homenetmen from a relegation-zone team to a midfield team and qualified for the second round

NSA finished 10th in their first season, Atlas finished 11th and will face the runner-up of the 2nd division Final in the relegation playoff while Byblos finished last and is directly relegated to second division.

Pos	2022–23 Lebanese Basketball League regular season							
Pos	Team	Pld	W	L	PF	PA	PD	Status: In progress
1	Dynamo	22	21	1	2006	1529	+477	Qualified
2	Sagesse	22	20	2	2089	1529	+560	Qualified
3	Beirut Club	22	18	4	2030	1658	+372	Qualified
4	Al Riyadi	22	17	5	2086	1705	+381	Qualified
5	Champville	22	10	12	1607	1760	–153	Qualified
6	Leaders Club	22	10	12	1707	1861	–154	Qualified
7	Hoops Club	22	9	13	1639	1619	+20	Qualified
8	Homenetmen	22	8	14	1728	2014	–286	Qualified
9	Antranik	22	7	15	1688	1987	-299	
10	NSA	22	6	16	1651	1779	-128	
11	Atlas	22	4	18	1691	2052	-361	Relegation play-offs
12	Byblos Club	22	2	20	1588	2017	-429	Relegated

== Second stage ==
The second stage began on 8 April 2023.

Signing Duop Reath proved to be crucial for Riyadi, as they ended up top their group, Dynamo second, Leaders third and Homenetmen 4th

Sagesse continued to dominate their group, while Beirut finished 2nd, Hoops 3rd despite a shocking win over Beirut, and Maristes a disappointing 4th

== Finals ==
In the first semi-final, Riyadi defeated Sagesse 3–0 on tight margins (4, 5 and 3 pts). Duop Reath proved again to be a crucial player for Riyadi.

In the other semi-final, Dynamo destroyed Beirut, even with the return of Shabazz Muhammad in Beirut's ranks.

The first game of the final ended in a shock win for Dynamo against Riyadi 87–78. The absence of Karim Zeinoun affected the team, the Lebanese players were virtually absent, which profited Dynamo to take the win

Riyadi made a comeback against Dynamo, with multiples 3 pts scored, especially by Karim Zeinoun, voted Man of the Match. The game ended 92–84 for Riyadi at home.

At the third game, Dynamo had the lead at the first half before fumbling it with multiple missed shots and loads of turnovers. Riyadi managed to win the game 82–73.

Final 4

(Best of 5)

Finals

(Best of 7)

Dynamo
3

Beirut
0

Dynamo
1

Al Riyadi
4

Sagesse
0

Al Riyadi
3
