= Ali Traoré =

French basketball player

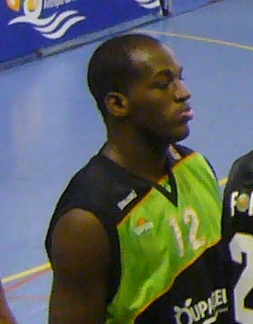
- Traore playing for ASVEL in 2008

Personal information
- Born: February 28, 1985 (age 41) Abidjan, Côte d'Ivoire
- Listed height: 6 ft 10 in (2.08 m)
- Listed weight: 250 lb (113 kg)

Career information
- College: College of Southern Idaho (2004–2005)
- NBA draft: 2007: undrafted
- Playing career: 2001–2022
- Position: Center

Career history
- 2001–2004: ASVEL Basket
- 2005: UJAP Quimper 29
- 2005–2006: Chorale Roanne
- 2006–2008: STB Le Havre
- 2008–2010: ASVEL Basket
- 2010–2011: Virtus Roma
- 2011–2012: Lokomotiv Kuban
- 2013: Alba Berlin
- 2013: JSF Nanterre
- 2014: Amchit Club
- 2014–2015: Strasbourg IG
- 2015–2016: Limoges CSP
- 2016–2017: Estudiantes
- 2017: Byblos Club
- 2017: Antibes Sharks
- 2018: AS Monaco
- 2018–2020: Strasbourg IG
- 2020–2022: Antibes Sharks

Career highlights
- French League champion (2009); 4× French League Cup winner (2010, 2015, 2018, 2019); French League French Player's MVP (2010); French League Best Sixth Man (2019); 3× French League All-Star (2007, 2009–2010); German Cup winner (2013)
Medals
Men's basketball
Representing France
FIBA EuroBasket
Silver medal – second place	2011 Lithuania

Ali Traoré (born February 28, 1985) is an Ivorian-born French former professional basketball player. He also represented the France national basketball team internationally. Standing at 2.08 m (6 ft 10 in), he played at the center position.

== Professional career ==
Traoré made his professional debut with ASVEL Basket during the 2001–02 season. In the 2004–05 season he played college basketball at the College of Southern Idaho. In February 2005, he returned to France and signed with UJAP Quimper 29 for the rest of the season. For the 2005–06 season he signed with Chorale Roanne. From 2006 to 2008 he played with STB Le Havre.

On June 28, 2008, he signed a one-year deal with ASVEL Basket. On June 30, 2009, he re-signed with ASVEL. On July 22, 2010, he signed a two-year contract with Italian club Virtus Roma. He left Roma after one season. On August 1, 2011, Traore signed a two-year contract with Russian club Lokomotiv Kuban. On December 10, 2012, he parted ways with Lokomotiv.

On December 27, 2012, he signed with Serbian club KK Crvena zvezda. However, he left the club on February 6, 2013, due to a knee injury. On February 18, 2013, he signed with German club Alba Berlin for the rest of the season. On September 24, 2013, he signed with JSF Nanterre. On December 22, 2013, he parted ways with Nanterre. On February 19, 2014, he signed with Amchit Club of Lebanon for the rest of the season.

On July 24, 2014, Traore signed a one-year deal with Strasbourg IG. On July 8, 2015, he signed a one-year deal with Limoges CSP.

On August 3, 2016, Traore signed with Spanish club Estudiantes. On January 26, 2017, he parted ways with Estudiantes. On March 14, 2017, he signed with Byblos Club of Lebanon.

On November 22, 2017, Traore signed with Antibes Sharks. On January 3, 2018, he moved to AS Monaco for the rest of the 2017–18 Pro A season. Traore joined Strasbourg IG in 2018. He averaged 11.3 points, 3.7 rebounds and 1.2 assists per game during the 2019–20 season. He rejoined Antibes Sharks on September 10, 2020.

On March 1, 2022, he has announced his retirement from professional basketball.

== National team career ==
As a member of the senior French national team he won the silver medal at the 2011 EuroBasket in Lithuania.
