= Rony Fahed =

Lebanese basketball player (born 1981)

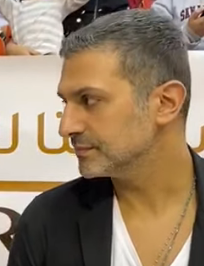
- Rony Fahed in 2020

Free agent
- Position: Point guard
- League: Lebanese Basketball League

Personal information
- Born: November 6, 1981 (age 45) Achrafieh, Lebanon
- Listed height: 6 ft 0 1/2 in (1.84 m)

Career information
- Playing career: 1997–present

Career history
- 1997–2000: Kahraba Zouk
- 2000–2002: Jamhour BC
- 2002–2007: Blue Stars
- 2007–2009: Hekmeh BC
- 2009–2010: Tianjin Ronggang
- 2010–2011: Hekmeh BC
- 2011–2012: Tianjin Ronggang
- 2012–2014: Al Mouttahed Tripoli
- 2014–2016: Champville SC
- 2016–2017: Tadamon Zouk
- 2017–2019: Beirut Club
- 2019–2020: Homenetmen
- 2020–2021: Sagesse

Career highlights
- William Jones Cup -07; Asian Clubs Championship -07; Lebanon Senior National Team -99 to present; Asian Championships in Doha -05 (Silver): 12.75ppg (23 3-pters made in 7 games), 2.13apg, 1.75spg; WABA cup 2005; WABA Cup -04; Asia-Basket.com Lebanese League All-Domestic Players Team -04, 05; Asian Championships -99(6th), 01(Finalist), 03(4th), 05(Finalist), 07(Finalist): Asia-Basket.com All-Lebanese League 2nd Team -04; Asia-Basket Lebanese League All-Domestic Players Team -04; West Asian Cup -04; West Asian Championships in Tehran -04; FIBA World Championships -02,06,10; Mediterranean Games in Tunisia -01; West Asian Championship 1st place -00, 01: 17.53mpg, 83%FT, 45% 3PT, 11PPG, 2.75RPG, 1.25SPG, 3APG; Lebanese Championship Under18 1st place-99 (kahraba); Lebanon National Team -99-01-02-03-05-06-07-08-09; Captain, Lebanese U22 National Team -98 (team that beat China with Yao Ming); Lebanese Championship Under 18 1st place-98 (kahraba)
Medals
Men's basketball
Representing Lebanon
FIBA Asia Championship
| Silver medal – second place | 2001 Shanghai | Team |
| Silver medal – second place | 2005 Doha | Team |
| Silver medal – second place | 2007 Tokushima | Team |

Rony Boulos Fahed (born November 6, 1981, in Achrafieh, Lebanon) is a Lebanese professional basketball player. He was also a member of the Lebanon national basketball team that participated in the 2002 FIBA World Championship in the United States, in the 2006 FIBA World Championship which took place in Japan, and in the 2010 FIBA World Championship held in Turkey. Fahed also participated at the 2007 FIBA Asia Championship, 2009 FIBA Asia Championship and other international tournaments.

== Career ==
=== Statistics ===
- 1997-1998: Kahraba Zouk: 2.63spg, 4.38apg
- 1998-1999: Kahraba Zouk: 1.9spg, 3apg
- 1999-: Kahraba Zouk: 3.7apg
- 2000-2001: CAE Jamhour(1T): Assists-3 (5.7), 1.82spg, 3.47rbg, 82% FT, 36% 3pt
- 2001-2002: Jamhour (1T): 10.2ppg, 1.65spg, 5.24apg
- 2002-2003: Blue Stars (Lebanon) (1T): 16.39ppg, 3.61rpg, 2.17spg, 3.39apg, 37% 3pt
- 2003-2004: Blue Stars (Lebanon) (1T): 15.1ppg, 2.4rpg, Assists-1 (5.8), Steals-3 (2.1), 3pt-1 (45%)

=== Awards and achievements ===
- William Jones Cup -07
- Asian Clubs Championship -07
- Lebanon Senior National Team -99 to present
- Asian Championships in Doha -05 (Silver): 12.75ppg (23 3-pters made in 7 games), 2.13apg, 1.75spg
- WABA cup 2005
- WABA Cup -04
- Asia-Basket.com Lebanese League All-Domestic Players Team -04, 05
- Asian Championships -99(6th), 01(Finalist), 03(4th), 05(Finalist), 07(Finalist)
- Asia-Basket.com All-Lebanese League 2nd Team -04
- Asia-Basket Lebanese League All-Domestic Players Team -04
- West Asian Cup -04
- West Asian Championships in Tehran -04
- FIBA World Championships -02,06,10
- Mediterranean Games in Tunisia -01
- West Asian Championship 1st place -00, 01: 17.53mpg, 83%FT, 45% 3PT, 11PPG, 2.75RPG, 1.25SPG, 3APG
- Lebanese Championship Under18 1st place-99 (kahraba)
- Lebanon National Team -99-01-02-03-05-06-07-08-09
- Captain, Lebanese U22 National Team -98 (team that beat China with Yao Ming)
- Lebanese Championship Under 18 1st place-98 (kahraba)
