= Dynamo Lebanon =

- Leagues: Lebanese Basketball League
- Founded: 2005 as Tebnin SC; 2020 as Dynamo Lebanon
- Arena: Rockland Arena
- Location: Beirut, Lebanon
- Team manager: Elie Youssef
- Head coach: Roland Tabet
- Ownership: Faissal Kalaawi resigned on October 17,2023
- Championships: 2x Div II champions, Lebanese cup champions

Dynamo Lebanon (Arabic: دينامو لبنان) is a Lebanese basketball club located in Saifi Village, Beirut, Lebanon.

== History ==
The club which was known as Tebnin SC, won the Lebanese Division 2 in 2005 and Lebanese Division 1 in 2006. Following their name change in 2020, their highest achievements were winning the 2020–21 Lebanese Cup, in addition to finishing the 2022–23 Lebanese Basketball League as regular season champions, before the losing the title in the finals. They also participated in the 2023 Arab Club Basketball Championship, where they qualified to the round of 16. Additionally, they reached the final of the 2023 Dubai International Basketball Championship. Later on, they withdrew from the 2023–24 season due to sport-political issues.

== Notable players ==
- (Lebanon) Ali Mahmoud
- (Lebanon) Bassel Bawji
- (Lebanon) Ahmad Ibrahim
- (Lebanon) Ghaleb Rida
- (Lebanon) Elie Rustom
- (United States) Cleanthony Early
- (United States) Scotty Hopson
- (United States) Zach Lofton
- (South Sudan) Jo Lual-Acuil
- (Tunisia) Radhouane Slimane
- (Senegal) Ibrahima Thomas
