= Jordan Bruner =

American basketball player (born 1997)

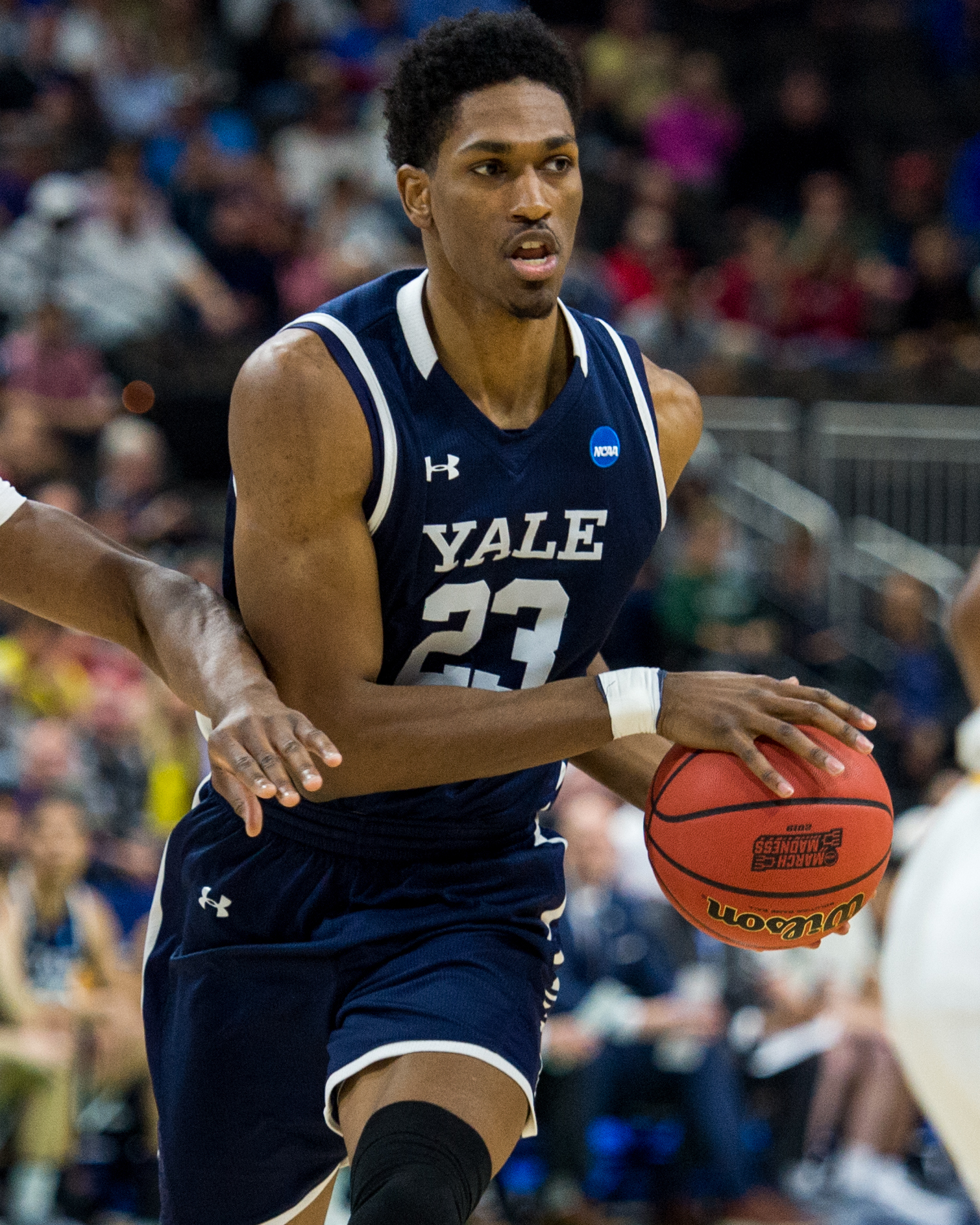

No. 2 – Earthfriends Tokyo Z
- Position: Power forward
- League: B.League

Personal information
- Born: December 31, 1997 (age 28) Oklahoma City, Oklahoma, U.S.
- Listed height: 6 ft 10 in (2.08 m)
- Listed weight: 225 lb (102 kg)

Career information
- High school: Spring Valley (Columbia, South Carolina)
- College: Yale (2016–2020); Alabama (2020–2021)
- NBA draft: 2021: undrafted
- Playing career: 2021–present

Career history
- 2021–2022: Imortal Basket
- 2022–2023: SK Slavia Prague
- 2023: BK Děčín
- 2023–2024: Antranik
- 2024–2025: Tachikawa Dice
- 2025–present: Earthfriends Tokyo Z

Career highlights
- First-team All-Ivy League (2020)

Dontae Jordan Bruner (born December 31, 1997) is an American professional basketball player for Earthfriends Tokyo Z of the B.League. He played college basketball for the Alabama Crimson Tide and the Yale Bulldogs.

== Early life and high school career ==
Bruner was born in Oklahoma City, Oklahoma but moved to South Carolina at the age of 11. He attended Spring Valley High School, where he was coached by Perry Dozier. As a sophomore, he averaged 12 points per game. Bruner missed most of his junior season with injuries.

As a senior, he averaged 16 points, 12 rebounds, 4 assists and 4 blocks per game. Bruner was a three-time All-State performer. He was regarded as a three-star prospect, ranked the second-best South Carolina player in his class by 247Sports. Bruner committed to Yale in November 2015 over an offer from Clemson.

== College career ==
Bruner missed the first four games of his freshman season with a knee injury and wore a brace for the rest of the year. On January 2, 2017, he scored a career-high 25 points in an 88–72 win over Hartford. He averaged 8.4 points and 5.6 rebounds per game, finishing second in the Ivy League in blocks with 55. On November 4, 2017, Bruner tore his meniscus during a scrimmage against Boston University, forcing him to miss his sophomore season. Bruner averaged 10.4 points and 8.3 rebounds per game as a junior. He helped Yale finish with a 22–8 record and reach the NCAA Tournament, where they fell to LSU 79–74.

Coming into his senior season, he was the only returning starter. Bruner posted 17 points and 15 rebounds against North Carolina on December 30, 2019. On February 21, 2020, he recorded the first triple-double in Yale history with 14 points, 11 rebounds and 10 assists in an 81–80 double-overtime win against Cornell. As a senior, Bruner averaged 10.9 points, 9.2 rebounds and 3.7 assists per game and had 48 blocked shots and 29 steals. He was named to the First Team All-Ivy League.

Following the season, Bruner declared for the 2020 NBA draft while maintaining his college eligibility. He ultimately transferred to Alabama for his final season of eligibility, choosing the Crimson Tide over Baylor and Maryland. Bruner suffered a knee injury against Kentucky on January 13, 2021, missing a month. He averaged 5.6 points, 3.9 rebounds, 1.2 assists and 1.2 steals per game in his only season at Alabama.

== Professional career ==
On August 14, 2021, Bruner signed his first professional contract with Imortal Basket of the Liga Portuguesa de Basquetebol. He averaged 8.2 points, 5.9 rebounds, and 1.3 assists per game. On August 17, 2022, Bruner signed with SK Slavia Prague of the National Basketball League. In 20 games he averaged 9.5 points, 6.0 rebounds, and 1.1 assists per game.

On February 1, 2023, Bruner signed with fellow Czech club BK Děčín. He joined Antranik of the Lebanese Basketball League for the 2023-24 season. On July 11, 2024, Bruner signed with the Tachikawa Dice of the B.League. On February 21, 2025, his contract was terminated. On July 9, 2025, Bruner signed with Earth Friends Tokyo Z.

== Career statistics ==
Legend
GP	Games played	GS	Games started	MPG	Minutes per game
FG%	Field goal percentage	3P%	3-point field goal percentage	FT%	Free throw percentage
RPG	Rebounds per game	APG	Assists per game	SPG	Steals per game
BPG	Blocks per game	PPG	Points per game	**Bold**	Career high

=== College ===
Year	Team	GP	GS	MPG	FG%	3P%	FT%	RPG	APG	SPG	BPG	PPG
2016–17	Yale	25	0	22.4	**.513**	.300	.652	5.6	1.2	.4	**2.2**	8.4
2017–18	Yale	Injured										
2018–19	Yale	**30**	**30**	28.0	.511	.278	.734	8.3	3.0	1.0	1.5	10.4
2019–20	Yale	28	28	**32.4**	.443	.323	**.766**	**9.2**	**3.7**	1.0	1.7	**10.9**
2020–21	Alabama	24	23	18.1	.434	**.328**	.710	3.9	1.3	**1.2**	.9	5.6
Career		107	81	25.6	.477	.309	.716	6.9	2.4	.9	1.6	9.0

== Personal life ==
Bruner's sister Ashley played basketball at South Carolina and is retired from playing professionally overseas. His younger brother Tommy also plays professional basketball.
