= Corey Williams (basketball, born 1977) =

American basketball player (1977–2024)

Personal information
- Born: August 3, 1977 New York City, New York, U.S.
- Died: May 10, 2024 (aged 46) Melbourne, Victoria, Australia
- Listed height: 191 cm (6 ft 3 in)
- Listed weight: 86 kg (190 lb)

Career information
- High school: Rice (New York City, New York)
- College: MCC–Penn Valley (1995–1997); Alabama State (1997–1999)
- NBA draft: 1999: undrafted
- Playing career: 1999–2016
- Position: Point guard

Career history
- 1999: Dakota Wizards
- 2000–2001: Club San Carlos
- 2001: Brooklyn Kings
- 2001–2002: Minas
- 2003: Brooklyn Kings
- 2003–2004: 08 Stockholm
- 2004–2005: Yunnan Honghe
- 2005: New Jersey Flyers
- 2005: Westchester Wildfire
- 2005: Sellbytel Baskets Nürnberg
- 2006: Sioux Falls Skyforce
- 2006: Guaiqueríes de Margarita
- 2006: Cholet Basket
- 2007: Sioux Falls Skyforce
- 2007: Dakota Wizards
- 2007–2010: Townsville Crocodiles
- 2008: KK Cibona
- 2009: Trotamundos de Carabobo
- 2010–2011: Melbourne Tigers
- 2012: Byblos Club
- 2012: Piratas de Quebradillas
- 2012–2013: Bejje SC
- 2013: Hoops Club
- 2014: Al Mouttahed Tripoli
- 2015–2016: Tadamon Zouk

Career highlights
- NBL Most Valuable Player (2010); All-NBL First Team (2010); 3× All-NBL Second Team (2008, 2009, 2011); NBA D-League champion (2007); All-CBA Second Team (2006); CBA All-Defensive Team (2006); CBA assists leader (2006); NJCAA Division II champion (1996)

Corey Paul "Homicide" Williams (born Carey Paul Williams; August 3, 1977 – May 10, 2024) was an American professional basketball player. He played college basketball for MCC–Penn Valley and Alabama State before gaining notoriety as a streetball player in New York City. He played professionally for 17 years, including a four-year stint in the Australian National Basketball League (NBL) between 2007 and 2011, where he earned NBL Most Valuable Player honors in 2010 with the Townsville Crocodiles.

== Early life ==
Williams was born at Bronx-Lebanon Hospital in the Bronx, New York City. Born as Carey Williams, he changed his name to Corey in middle school after being teased in elementary school. Due to poor grades in middle school, his mother moved him to Rice High School, an all-boys Catholic school in Harlem.

== College career ==
Williams received no scholarship offers coming out of high school. He received an offer to play for MCC–Penn Valley Community College, a junior college in Kansas City. As a freshman in 1995–96, he helped Penn Valley win the NJCAA Division II men's basketball championship before being named a JUCO first-team All-American as a sophomore.

In 1997, Williams joined the Alabama State Hornets. In two seasons, he averaged 12.5 points, 4.9 rebounds, 1.5 assists and 1.6 steals in 54 games. He completed his degree in criminal justice in 2000, fulfilling a promise to his mother.

Coming out of the small Division I school, Williams had no connections to professional basketball and played streetball in New York City, where he was given the nickname "Homicide". In 2012, he was named in ESPN's "Elite 24: Rucker Park legends".

== Professional career ==
Williams made his professional debut during the 1999–2000 International Basketball Association season, where he had a brief stint with the Dakota Wizards. After a year touring with the Harlem Globetrotters, he played for Club San Carlos in the Dominican Republic and the Brooklyn Kings of the United States Basketball League during the 2000–01 season.

For the 2001–02 season, Williams played in Brazil with Minas.

After another stint with the Brooklyn Kings in 2003, Williams played in Sweden during the 2003–04 season with 08 Stockholm.

After spending time with the Denver Nuggets during the 2004 off-season, Williams played for Yunnan Honghe of the Chinese Basketball Association during the 2004–05 season. He averaged 27 points per game with Yunnan. In May 2005, he had a one-game stint with the New Jersey Flyers and a three-game stint with the Westchester Wildfire, both of the United States Basketball League.

After spending his summer in 2005 working the competition on the streets of New York City, Williams was noticed by Toronto Raptors assistant coach Jim Todd. As a result, on October 3, 2005, Williams signed with the Raptors for training camp. Williams averaged 4.0 points and 1.0 assists in four pre-season games for the Raptors before being waived by the team on October 27.

On November 3, 2005, Williams was selected by the Austin Toros in the ninth round of the 2005 NBA Development League draft. He was waived by Austin on November 17 before appearing in a game for them. In December 2005, he signed with Sellbytel Baskets Nürnberg of the German Basketball Bundesliga, but left the team after appearing in just three games due to family problems. In January 2006, he joined the Sioux Falls Skyforce of the Continental Basketball Association. He was named to the CBA All-Defensive Team and All-League Second Team for the 2005–06 season. He had a league-high three triple-doubles, which tied the franchise record for triple-doubles in a season. He later had a one-game stint with Venezuelan team Guaiqueríes de Margarita.

After an NBA Summer League stint with the Indiana Pacers and a pre-season stint with the Denver Nuggets, Williams played eight games with French team Cholet Basket to begin the 2006–07 season. On January 1, 2007, he was acquired by the Sioux Falls Skyforce, now playing in the NBA Development League. After being waived by the Skyforce on February 16, he was picked up by the Dakota Wizards a week later. He helped the Wizards win the D-League championship and averaged 14 points, four rebounds and 3.5 assists per game for the 2006–07 season.

Williams had another Summer League stint in 2007, this time with the Golden State Warriors. On October 3, 2007, he signed with the Townsville Crocodiles of the Australian National Basketball League (NBL), replacing the injured Rosell Ellis. In 25 games during the 2007–08 NBL season, Williams averaged 21.4 points, 4.9 rebounds, 4.6 assists and 1.8 steals per game. He was named to the All-NBL Second Team. Following the NBL season, he joined KK Cibona for the rest of the Croatian league season.

Williams returned to the Crocodiles for the 2008–09 NBL season. In 32 games, he averaged 18.7 points, 4.4 rebounds, 4.4 assists and 1.2 steals per game. He was again named to the All-NBL Second Team and helped the Crocodiles reach the semi-finals. Following the NBL season, he had a four-game stint with Trotamundos de Carabobo in Venezuela.

Williams returned to the Crocodiles for the 2009–10 NBL season. He was named the recipient of the NBL Most Valuable Player Award after averaging 18.6 points, 5.0 rebounds and 4.1 assists over his 31 games, shooting the ball at 50.6% from the field.

In November 2010, Williams joined the Melbourne Tigers for the rest of the 2010–11 NBL season. On January 2, 2011, he recorded 12 points, 10 rebounds and 11 assists in an 87–66 win over the Adelaide 36ers.

In his four NBL seasons, Williams played 114 games (91 for Townsville and 23 for Melbourne) and averaged 19.1 points, 5.1 rebounds and 4.7 assists per contest.

In January 2012, Williams joined Byblos Club in Lebanon. Following the Lebanese season, he played for Piratas de Quebradillas in Puerto Rico.

For the 2012–13 season, Williams played for Bejje SC. He continued in Lebanon for the 2013–14 season, initially with Hoops Club and then later joining Al Mouttahed Tripoli.

In February 2015, Williams returned to Lebanon to play out the 2014–15 season with Tadamon Zouk. In 10 games, he averaged 23.0 points, 7.9 rebounds, 6.1 assists and 2.5 steals per game.

Williams returned to Tadamon in February 2016, playing six games between February 14 and April 28.

== Post-playing career ==
Williams became a notable NBL commentator in Australia following his playing career, initially in a smaller capacity in 2015 and then full time in 2017 with Fox Sports. He is credited with helping the NBL surge in the late 2010s and was one of the NBL's greatest ambassadors.

In December 2021, Williams was appointed the Creative Director of Basketball for Foot Locker Pacific.

== Personal life ==
Williams' ancestral home is Jamaica. As of 2012, he traveled with a Jamaican passport.

Williams had two daughters, Bella and Gabi.

=== Illness and death ===
In August 2023, Williams was diagnosed with stage 4 colon cancer. He underwent chemotherapy in New York before returning to his adopted home of Australia. He continued to undergo treatment as recently as two weeks prior to his death. He died on May 10, 2024, at the age of 46, at Cabrini Hospital in Melbourne. Williams' funeral service was held at the Melbourne Sports and Aquatic Centre.
