= Kahraba =

Kahraba may refer to:

- Al-Kahraba FC, an Iraqi football club in Baghdad
- Kahrabaa Al-Hartha, an Iraqi football team in Basra
- Kahrabaa Ismailia SC, an Egyptian football club in Ismailia
- Kahraba Zouk, a Lebanese sports club in Kesrouan, Lebanon
- Kahraba (footballer) (born 1994), Egyptian footballer
