= Troy Baxter Jr. =

American basketball player (born 1996)

Al-Arabi
- Position: Forward
- League: Qatari Basketball League

Personal information
- Born: March 5, 1996 (age 30) Tallahassee, Florida, U.S.
- Listed height: 6 ft 9 in (2.06 m)
- Listed weight: 200 lb (91 kg)

Career information
- High school: Oldsmar Christian (Oldsmar, Florida)
- College: UNLV (2016–2017); Florida Gulf Coast (2018–2019); Morgan State (2019–2021)
- NBA draft: 2021: undrafted
- Playing career: 2021–present

Career history
- 2021–2022: Windy City Bulls
- 2022: Wisconsin Herd
- 2022: Grand Rapids Gold
- 2022: Fort Wayne Mad Ants
- 2022: Indios de San Francisco
- 2022: San José
- 2022: Antranik
- 2023: Khatsaga
- 2023: Canterbury Rams
- 2023: Trouville
- 2024: Oklahoma City Blue
- 2024: Westchester Knicks
- 2024: Manawatu Jets
- 2024: Calgary Surge
- 2025: Indomables de Ciudad Juárez
- 2025: Amman United
- 2025: Nadim Souaid Academy
- 2025: Al Ahly
- 2025: Titanes del Sur
- 2025–2026: Al-Shamal
- 2026: Southern Districts Spartans
- 2026: Gambusinos de Fresnillo
- 2026–present: Al-Arabi

Career highlights
- NZNBL champion (2023); First-team All-MEAC (2021); MEAC All-Defensive Team (2021)
- Stats at NBA.com
- Stats at Basketball Reference

Troy Leonard Baxter Jr. (born March 5, 1996) is an American professional basketball player for Al-Arabi of the Qatari Basketball League (QBL). He played college basketball for the UNLV Runnin' Rebels, Florida Gulf Coast Eagles and Morgan State Bears.

== High school career ==
Baxter attended Oldsmar Christian School in Oldsmar, Florida. He saw his stock rise as he played for Team Breakdown in the Under Armour Association in 2015. Baxter committed to play college basketball for the South Florida Bulls on May 1, 2015.

Baxter averaged 17 points, 7 rebounds and 1.5 blocks as a senior during the 2015–16 season. He was rated as a four-star recruit and ranked 90th in the ESPN 100. Baxter won the 2016 American Family Insurance High School Slam Dunk Contest. On August 27, 2016, it was reported that Baxter had been released from his letter of intent with South Florida. On September 1, 2016, he committed to the UNLV Runnin' Rebels.

== College career ==
=== UNLV (2016–2017) ===
Baxter averaged 4.3 points and 2.3 rebounds per game during his freshman season with the UNLV Runnin' Rebels. His playing time did not meet his expectations and the Runnin' Rebels only won four games in conference play. On March 30, 2017, Baxter announced that he would not return to the Runnin' Rebels.

=== Florida Gulf Coast (2017–2019) ===
On June 20, 2017, Baxter committed to play for the Florida Gulf Coast Eagles. He had to sit out the 2017–18 due to National Collegiate Athletic Association (NCAA) transfer rules. Baxter treated practice sessions as his game time and credits the period with helping him develop a better feel for basketball.

Baxter averaged 7.5 points, 2.9 rebounds, 1.1 assists and 1.1 blocks per game during the 2018–19 season. On April 5, 2019, he declared for the 2019 NBA draft. He did not sign with an agent and was eligible to return to college. Baxter elected to return after not liking his draft chances but announced his intention to transfer.

=== Morgan State (2019–2021) ===
Baxter desired to transfer to a team with coaches that had experience sending players to the National Basketball Association (NBA). He chose the Morgan State Bears for their head coach Kevin Broadus who had coached 12 future NBA players during his college career.

Baxter averaged 10.2 points and 5.1 rebounds per game during the 2019–20 season. His 1.9 blocks per game were the second highest in the Mid-Eastern Athletic Conference (MEAC).

Baxter averaged 15.5 points, 4.4 rebounds and 1.6 blocks per game during the 2020–21 season. He was selected to the All-MEAC First Team and the All-Defensive Team. He won the 2021 Great Clips Slam Dunk Championship and became the first player to win slam dunk titles in high school and college. On August 9, 2021, Baxter was named as the MEAC Male Student-Athlete of the Year for his academic and extracurricular work.

== Professional career ==
After going undrafted in the 2021 NBA draft, Baxter joined the Chicago Bulls for the 2021 NBA Summer League. On October 15, 2021, he signed a contract with the Bulls, but was waived the next day. Baxter joined the Windy City Bulls of the NBA G League as an affiliate player. He was waived by Windy City on February 1, 2022. He was then acquired by the Wisconsin Herd on February 2; waived on February 6; acquired by the Grand Rapids Gold on February 14; waived on March 3; and then acquired by the Fort Wayne Mad Ants on March 18.

In May and June 2022, Baxter played eight games for Indios de San Francisco of the Dominican Liga Nacional de Baloncesto (LNB).

In October 2022, Baxter had a three-game stint with Deportivo San José of the Liga Sudamericana de Básquetbol during the 2022 season. In November and December 2022, he had a four-game stint in Lebanon with Antranik. He then moved to Mongolia in January 2023 to play for Khatsaga.

On April 4, 2023, Baxter signed with the Canterbury Rams for the 2023 New Zealand NBL season. He won the 2023 NZNBL championship with the Rams.

On September 7, 2023, Baxter signed with CSKA Sofia of the Bulgarian National Basketball League. On September 20, he departed the team before the start of the season.

On September 21, 2023, Baxter's G League player rights were traded to the Long Island Nets; he joined them on October 28. He was waived by the Nets on November 3.

In November 2023, Baxter had a three-game stint with Trouville of the Liga Uruguaya de Básquetbol (LUB).

On February 15, 2024, Baxter joined the Oklahoma City Blue of the NBA G League. He played two games before being waived on February 29. He joined the Westchester Knicks on March 14, 2024, where he played two games.

Baxter joined the Manawatu Jets for the 2024 New Zealand NBL season. He was released by the Jets on May 15, 2024.

On May 28, 2024, Baxter signed with the Calgary Surge of the Canadian Elite Basketball League, but was waived on June 5. Baxter signed with the San Miguel Beermen for the 2024–25 PBA Commissioner's Cup but was released without playing a game because he could not receive clearance.

On February 5, 2025, Baxter signed with the Orthodox of the Jordanian Premier Basketball League, but did not appear in a game. On February 20, he signed with the Amman United of the Jordanian Premier Basketball League. Baxter played seven games with Nadim Souaid Academy of the Lebanese Basketball League in 2025. On April 18, he signed with Al Ahly of the Egyptian Basketball Premier League. In May, Baxter joined Titanes del Sur of the LNB. In October, he signed with Al-Shamal of the Qatari Basketball League (QBL). On May 28, 2026, Baxter signed with the Southern Districts Spartans of the NBL1 North.

Baxter played two games for Gambusinos de Fresnillo of the Liga Nacional de Baloncesto Profesional in 2026. On September 23, 2026, Baxter signed with Al-Arabi of the QBL.

== Personal life ==
Baxter is the son of Dianna and Troy Baxter Sr. He has a daughter who was born in June 2020. Baxter cites LeBron James as his idol due to his activism.
