= Ghassan Sarkis =

Lebanese basketball coach (born 1957)

Tadamon Hrajel
- League: Lebanese Basketball League

Personal information
- Born: 8 August 1957 (age 69)
- Coaching career: 1978–present

Ghassan Sarkis (Arabic: غسان سركيس, born in Bikfaya on August 8, 1957) is a Lebanese basketball coach who currently manages Tadamon Hrajel in the Lebanese Basketball League. He became especially famous during his time coaching the Lebanese team Sagesse in its golden years of success of the 1990s and 2000s. He has also coached the Lebanon national basketball team.

== Biography ==
Born in Bikfaya, Matn, on August 8, 1957, he has 3 children: Karl Sarkis, the basketball player, Ralph, and Stephany.

He began his coaching career in 1978, in the midst of the Lebanese Civil War.

In 1992, he was appointed the coach the Sagesse club, and with them won the Lebanese Championship, and the FIBA Asia Champions Cup in 1999 and 2000. In 2005, he started training Champville.

In 2021, he was hospitalized after experiencing complications from COVID-19. On February 24, 2021, it was reported that he had been extubated and was recovering.

On June 4, 2023, he resigned with Sagesse Club as a head coach.

== Previous teams ==
Lebanon

- Sagesse
- Champville
- Homenetmen
- Amchit
- Al-Riyadi
- Kahraba Zouk
- Abnaa Neptun
- Club Aamal Sportif Bikfaya

Syria

- Al-Ittihad SC Aleppo (2004–2005; 2022-2023)

== See also ==
- Fadi Khatib
- Elie Mchantaf
- Lebanese Basketball
