= Ndudi Ebi =

Nigerian-British basketball player (born 1984)

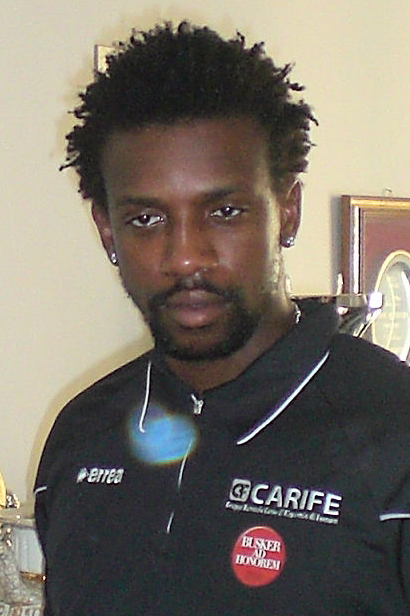
- Ebi in 2008

Personal information
- Born: 18 June 1984 (age 42) London, England
- Listed height: 6 ft 9 in (2.06 m)
- Listed weight: 240 lb (109 kg)

Career information
- High school: Westbury Christian School (Houston, Texas)
- NBA draft: 2003: 1st round, 26th overall pick
- Drafted by: Minnesota Timberwolves
- Playing career: 2003–2018
- Position: Forward
- Number: 44

Career history
- 2003–2005: Minnesota Timberwolves
- 2005–2006: Fort Worth Flyers
- 2007–2008: Bnei HaSharon
- 2008–2009: Carife Ferrara
- 2009–2010: Basket Rimini Crabs
- 2010–2011: Andrea Costa Imola
- 2011: Limoges CSP
- 2011: Ningxia Hanas
- 2011–2012: Anibal Zahle
- 2012: Jiangsu Monkey King
- 2012: Sidigas Avellino
- 2013: Vaqueros de Bayamón
- 2013: Bnei Herzliya
- 2014: Virtus Bologna
- 2014: Zamalek
- 2015: Virtus Roma
- 2015–2016: PMS Torino
- 2016: Manama
- 2016–2017: Byblos Club
- 2017: Shahrdari Tabriz
- 2017: Al-Ahli
- 2017–2018: Boulazac Basket Dordogne

Career highlights
- NBL China scoring champion (2011); Israeli League Rebounding Leader (2008); First-team Parade All-American (2003); McDonald's All-American (2003)

Career statistics
- Points: 40 (2.1 ppg)
- Rebounds: 19 (1.0 rpg)
- Assists: 4 (0.2 apg)
- Stats at NBA.com
- Stats at Basketball Reference

Ndudi Hamani Ebi (born 18 June 1984) is a Nigerian-British former professional basketball player who most notably played for the Minnesota Timberwolves of the National Basketball Association (NBA) between 2003 and 2005.

He initially committed to the University of Arizona, before making himself eligible for the NBA draft. Ebi was selected out of Westbury Christian School by the Minnesota Timberwolves in the first round (26th pick overall) of the 2003 NBA draft. In 2007-08 he was the top rebounder in the Israel Basketball Premier League.

Ebi was raised in Nigeria before moving to Houston, Texas, as a teenager to attend high school. He holds both British and Nigerian citizenship.

== Professional career ==
Ebi was the first first-round pick in three years for the Wolves; the team had forfeited five first-round picks after the team owner illegally made a deal with forward Joe Smith (the penalty was later reduced to three picks). After Ebi appeared in 19 games over the course of two seasons, Minnesota attempted to get an exception from the NBA so they could send him to the NBA Development League. Ebi was technically ineligible as the 2005–06 NBA season was his third year, and the D-League only accepted players who had been in the NBA for less than two years. Minnesota wanted to guide Ebi in, and they tacitly argued that Ebi was hardly a two-year veteran in the figurative sense, given his limited playing time. The league rejected Minnesota's request regarding Ebi, and to make room for Ronald Dupree, Minnesota released Ebi on 31 October 2005.

That two seasons with the Timberwolves ended up being Ebi's only playing time in the NBA, as his final game was on 20 April 2005, in a 95–73 win over the San Antonio Spurs. In his final game, Ebi recorded 18 points and 8 rebounds.

Ebi signed a free agent contract over the summer of 2006 with the Dallas Mavericks. After playing five pre-season games, averaging 5.2 points per game (ppg), Ebi was waived by the Mavericks on 26 October 2006.

On 30 September 2007, he signed with Israeli club Bnei HaSharon for one season. In 2007-08 he was the top rebounder in the Israel Basketball Premier League.

On 3 August 2008, he signed with Italian club Carife Ferrara, newly promoted to Serie A. He later played for the Basket Rimini Crabs in Italy and averaged 15.3 points per game, 13.6 rebounds per game, and 3.2 steals per game. In March 2011, he signed with Limoges CSP. In summer 2011, he signed with Anibal Zahle in Lebanon and thus joined the Division 1 of the Lebanese Basketball League. In 2012, he signed with Sidigas Avellino of Italy. He signed with the Vaqueros de Bayamón in 2013. On 4 February 2014, he signed with Virtus Bologna of Italy.

On 15 January 2015, after playing for Egyptian team Zamalek, Ebi returned to Italy after signing with Virtus Roma.

On 28 July 2015, Ebi signed with Auxilium CUS Torino.

On 7 April 2017, Ebi signed with Shahrdari Tabriz of the Iranian Basketball Super League.

On 15 December 2017, Ebi signed with French club Boulazac Basket Dordogne.

== Career statistics ==
Legend
GP	Games played	GS	Games started	MPG	Minutes per game
FG%	Field goal percentage	3P%	3-point field goal percentage	FT%	Free throw percentage
RPG	Rebounds per game	APG	Assists per game	SPG	Steals per game
BPG	Blocks per game	PPG	Points per game	**Bold**	Career high

=== NBA ===
==== Regular season ====
Year	Team	GP	GS	MPG	FG%	3P%	FT%	RPG	APG	SPG	BPG	PPG
2003–04	Minnesota	**17**	0	1.9	.429		.250	0.2	0.2	0.0	0.2	0.8
2004–05	Minnesota	2	0	**27.0**	**.524**	.000	**.556**	**8.0**	**0.5**	**0.5**	**0.5**	**13.5**
Career		19	0	4.5	.486	.000	.462	1.0	0.2	0.1	0.3	2.1

=== NBA D League ===
==== Regular season ====
Year	Team	GP	GS	MPG	FG%	3P%	FT%	RPG	APG	SPG	BPG	PPG
2005–06	Fort Worth	16	11	**24.8**	**.517**	**.200**	.688	**6.9**	.7	.5	**2.3**	11.4
2006–07	Fort Worth	**20**	**15**	23.8	.451	.125	**.737**	5.8	**.8**	**1.0**	1.4	**12.9**
Career		36	26	24.2	.475	.154	.709	6.3	.7	.8	1.8	12.2
