= Matt Freije =

Lebanese-American basketball player (born 1981)

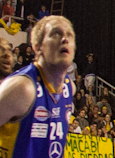

Personal information
- Born: October 2, 1981 (age 45) Overland Park, Kansas, U.S.
- Listed height: 6 ft 10 in (2.08 m)
- Listed weight: 240 lb (109 kg)

Career information
- High school: Shawnee Mission West (Overland Park, Kansas)
- College: Vanderbilt (2000–2004)
- NBA draft: 2004: 2nd round, 53rd overall pick
- Drafted by: Miami Heat
- Playing career: 2004–2013
- Position: Power forward
- Number: 35, 4

Career history
- 2004–2005: New Orleans Hornets
- 2005: Nashville Rhythm
- 2005–2006: Idaho Stampede
- 2006: Olympiacos
- 2006–2008: Brujos de Guayama
- 2006: Atlanta Hawks
- 2007–2008: Miami Heat
- 2008: Leones de Ponce
- 2008–2009: Fujian Xunxing
- 2009: Caguas Creoles
- 2009–2010: Al Riyadi Beirut
- 2010: Mets de Guaynabo
- 2010–2011: Hebraica y Macabi
- 2011: Maratonistas de Coamo
- 2011: Guangzhou Free Man
- 2011: BC Armia
- 2012: Hebraica y Macabi
- 2012: Guaiqueríes de Margarita
- 2012–2013: Amchit Club

Career highlights
- Third-team All-American – NABC, TSN (2004); First-team All-SEC (2004); Mr. Kansas Basketball (2000)
- Stats at NBA.com
- Stats at Basketball Reference

Matthew Wayne Freije (born October 2, 1981) is a Lebanese-American former professional basketball player. Freije attended Shawnee Mission West High School in Overland Park, Kansas before attending Vanderbilt University where he was an All-SEC performer. He was selected 53rd overall pick in the 2004 NBA draft by the Miami Heat, was then released and later played for the New Orleans Hornets. He played 19 games for the Atlanta Hawks during the 2006–07 season but was waived in December 2006 to clear a roster spot for Slava Medvedenko.

== College career ==
Freije played for the Vanderbilt University Commodores men's basketball team from 2000 to 2004. He chose to come to Vanderbilt due to his relationship with head basketball coach Kevin Stallings. In 2004, he was named First Team All-SEC and led the Commodores to the Sweet 16 of the NCAA Tournament for the first time since 1993. He left Vanderbilt as the leading scorer in school history, having surpassed Phil Cox in 2004. His record was broken in 2008 by Shan Foster.

Freije's tremendous career as a Commodore was highlighted by his senior year campaign, where he led Vanderbilt to a 23–10 record and a trip to the 2004 NCAA Tournament as a 6 seed. During the regular season, Freije had four thirty-point games, 32 vs. Indiana on November 24, 31 vs. Tennessee Tech on December 13, 32 vs. Alabama on Feb 18 and 31 vs. North Carolina State on Mar. 21. The Commodores started the season 12–0 until losing at Kentucky on Jan. 10. Vanderbilt, however, got its revenge three weeks later at home with a 66–60 victory over the #5 ranked Wildcats in a game where Freije scored 20 points and had 11 rebounds.

Vanderbilt would subsequently advance to the NCAA Tournament, and following a first round win over Western Michigan, Freije led the Commodores to the Sweet Sixteen following a stunning comeback victory over the 3 seed North Carolina State Wolfpack, a game where the Commodores rallied from an eleven-point deficit in the final 3:45 of the game . Freije scored 31 points during the victory, including 11 during the final 3:28 of the game. During his 1st team All-SEC senior season, he posted averages of 18.4 ppg along with 5.4 rpg.

== Professional career ==
After being drafted and subsequently released by the Miami Heat before the start of the season, Freije latched on with the New Orleans Hornets during the 2004–05 season, where he appeared in 23 games—11 of which he started. He averaged 4.0 points and 2.7 rebounds before being released later in the season. On December 26, 2004, Freije set his career high for both points and rebounds by registering 12 points and 11 rebounds in a 100–91 loss to the Cleveland Cavaliers.

One year later, during the 2006–07 season, Freije was signed by the Atlanta Hawks and appeared in 19 games and averaged 2.1 points per game. His best day as a Hawk was on December 10, 2006, when he shot 4–5 from the field en route to an 8-point, 5-rebound day against the Sacramento Kings. During his NBA career Freije appeared in 42 games and averaged 3.2 points and 2.0 rebounds per game.

Freije played for the Milwaukee Bucks summer league team in Las Vegas, Nevada. During his first game with the team, he finished second on the team in scoring with 11 points on 4–6 shooting (3–4 from three-point range) in an 88–79 loss to the Memphis Grizzlies . Throughout the NBA's Summer League in Vegas, Freije shot 58.6% from the field and 60% from three-point range, en route to averaging 11.8 points per game for the Bucks, who finished 4–1 during Vegas Summer League play. Freije finished second on the team in scoring and blocked shots per game and first in field goal percentage and three-point field goal percentage in only 21.5 minutes per game.

In the months leading up to his 2009 Summer League play with the Portland Trail Blazers, Freije was playing for Criollos de Caguas of the BSN.

After the 2009 FIBA Asia Championship Matt signed with Lebanese champions Sporting Al Riyadi Beirut.

Matt returned to Lebanon for the 2012–13 season and signed with Amchit Club in the Lebanese Basketball League.

== Career statistics ==
Legend
| GP | Games played | GS | Games started | MPG | Minutes per game |
| FG% | Field goal percentage | 3P% | 3-point field goal percentage | FT% | Free throw percentage |
| RPG | Rebounds per game | APG | Assists per game | SPG | Steals per game |
| BPG | Blocks per game | PPG | Points per game | **Bold** | Career high |

=== NBA ===
==== Regular season ====
| Year | Team | GP | GS | MPG | FG% | 3P% | FT% | RPG | APG | SPG | BPG | PPG |
|---|---|---|---|---|---|---|---|---|---|---|---|---|
| 2004–05 | New Orleans | **23** | **11** | **19.2** | .291 | **.259** | .625 | **2.7** | **.9** | **.6** | **.1** | **4.0** |
| 2006–07 | Atlanta | 19 | 0 | 7.7 | **.296** | .136 | **.833** | 1.2 | .4 | .2 | **.1** | 2.1 |
| Career | | 42 | 11 | 14.0 | .293 | .224 | .714 | 2.0 | .6 | .4 | .1 | 3.2 |

=== College ===
| Year | Team | GP | GS | MPG | FG% | 3P% | FT% | RPG | APG | SPG | BPG | PPG |
|---|---|---|---|---|---|---|---|---|---|---|---|---|
| 2000–01 | Vanderbilt | 27 | 18 | 23.9 | **.497** | **.390** | .792 | 4.4 | .6 | .2 | **1.0** | 10.4 |
| 2001–02 | Vanderbilt | 32 | 32 | 29.3 | .466 | .340 | .768 | 5.1 | **1.1** | .8 | .3 | 15.1 |
| 2002–03 | Vanderbilt | 29 | 28 | **31.1** | .443 | .351 | **.798** | 4.4 | **1.1** | **.9** | .4 | 17.9 |
| 2003–04 | Vanderbilt | **33** | **33** | 29.8 | .415 | .356 | .788 | **5.4** | .9 | .7 | .6 | **18.4** |
| Career | | 121 | 111 | 28.7 | .448 | .355 | .786 | 4.9 | .9 | .7 | .6 | 15.6 |
