= Haouch El-Omara =

Haouch El-Omara (in Arabic حوش الأمراء) also known as Shabab Zahle (in Arabic شباب زحلة) was a Lebanese basketball team who played in lower basketball divisions in Lebanon and reached the division A during 2009-2010 season.

The team folded in November 2011.
