= Tebnin SC =

Tebnin SC (Arabic: نادي تبنين الرياضي), sometimes Tebnine SC, was a Lebanese sports club. It originates in Tebnine, Bint Jbeil District, Lebanon.

Tebnin SC basketball team is part of the Lebanese Basketball League in division A after ascending the 4 divisions in the league. It plays its home games in the Cité Sportive indoor stadium in the Beirut's southern suburbs. Tebnin SC withdrew from the division A in the 2009–10 season, the team is relegated. The club was renamed to Dynamo Lebanon in 2020.

== Notable players ==
- (Lebanon) Ghaleb Rida
