= Atlas Ferzol =

- Leagues: Lebanese Basketball League
- Arena: St Joseph des Soeurs Antonines Arena Zahleh
- Location: Ferzol, Lebanon

Atlas Ferzol (Arabic: أطلس الفرزل) is a Lebanese basketball club located in Ferzol, Lebanon. The club won the Lebanese 3rd Division in 2017, then promoted to the Lebanese Basketball League in 2018, until their relegation in 2022–23.
