= Sabah Khoury =

Lebanese basketball player (born 1982)

Sagesse SC
- Title: Head coach
- League: Lebanese Basketball League

Personal information
- Born: November 10, 1982 (age 44) Kuwait
- Listed height: 6 ft 5 in (1.96 m)

Career information
- College: Lansing CC (2001–2002)
- Playing career: 2002–2019
- Position: Shooting guard
- Number: 24

Career history

Playing
- 2002–2005: Sagesse
- 2005–2006: Champville SC
- 2006–2007: Al Mouttahed Tripoli
- 2007–2009: Sagesse
- 2009–2010: Qingdao Doublestar
- 2010–2012: Sagesse
- 2012–2013: Amchit Club
- 2013–2014: Champville SC
- 2014–2015: Hoops Club
- 2015–2019: Sagesse

Coaching
- 2022–2023: Antranik
- 2023–2025: Champville SC
- 2025–2026: Club Central
- 2026–present: Sagesse SC

Sabah Khoury (born November 10, 1982) is a Lebanese former professional basketball player, and current coach. He currently serves as the head coach for Sagesse SC of the Lebanese Basketball League. Khoury formerly played for Sagesse, Amchit Club, and Champville Club in the Lebanese Basketball League, Qingdao Eagles in the Chinese Basketball Association (CBA), and Al Mouttahed Tripoli in the Libyan Basketball League. He has also represented the Lebanese national team in international competition.

== Early years ==
Sabah Khoury was born in Kuwait on 10 November 1982 and lived in Lebanon until he was 15. He moved to the United States to finish high school. He played at Okemos High School. His career ended with a loss to Kalamazoo Central High School. He then joined Lansing Community College for one year to study Business Management before moving back to Lebanon at the age of 19 to continue his studies there.

While in the United States, Sabah played for the Lansing Community College team (2001–02).

=== Career 2002–2005 ===
When Sabah moved back to Lebanon, after few meetings with Hekmeh BC's team and management, Sabah signed a three years contract with the team (2002–05) and started to play professionally at the age of 19.

==== 2002–03 season ====
- Team achievements
  - Lebanese Basketball League champion. (Hekmeh BC)
  - Lebanese Basketball Cup champion. (Hekmeh BC)

==== 2003–04 season ====
- Team achievements
  - Lebanese Basketball League champion. (Hekmeh BC)
  - West Asia Basketball League champion. (Hekmeh BC)
  - Asian Basketball Club Championship champion. (Hekmeh BC)
- Individual achievements
  - Top assist player in the West Asia Basketball League

==== 2004-–05 season ====
- Team achievements
  - West Asia Basketball League champion. (Hekmeh BC)

=== Career 2005–06 ===
After 2005, Sabah turned 22 and he was a free player since three years with Hekmeh BC. Coach Ghassan Sarkis wanted him to play for Champville SC, so Sabah took his chance and signed a one-year contract with the team (2005–06).

==== 2005–06 season ====
Sabah helped the team reach the final 4 after their famous breakup that led most of their main players to Sporting Al Riyadi Beirut.

=== Career 2006–07 ===
After 2006 in Champville SC, Sabah signed a 2-year contract with Hekmeh BC but in the same summer the president of the club resigned and Hekmeh BC was in a big mess. Meanwhile, Sabah was with the Lebanese national basketball team in the Basketball World Championship in Japan, and after he was back there was no team for Hekmeh BC. He picked Al Mouttahed Tripoli knowing that Hekmeh BC probably will not make a team and will drop to the second division. Few weeks after Sabah signed a one-year contract with Al Mouttahed Tripoli (2006–07), Hekmeh BC made a team in the last minute just to survive and prevent dropping to the second division and because it was too late the Lebanese Basketball Federation allowed them to sign with free players, so Sabah spent his year with Al Mouttahed Tripoli. It was a very short season for Sabah, because the team finished 5th in the league.

=== Career 2007–09 ===
After his contract with Al Mouttahed Tripoli ended, Sabah was back to Hekmeh BC (his old home) with a 2-year contract (2007–09).

==== 2007–08 season ====
- Individual achievements
  - Best Arabic player in the Arab Basketball League.
  - First Lebanese assist player and second overall.
- Season stats:
  - 22 games:
  - 14.4 ppg
  - 5.4 rpg
  - 6.4 apg
  - 1.9 spg

== Teams ==
- (United States) Lansing Community College (2001–2002)
- (Lebanon) Hekmeh BC (2002–2005)
- (Lebanon) Champville SC (2005–2006)
- (Lebanon) Al Mouttahed Tripoli (2006–2007)
- (Lebanon) Hekmeh BC (2007–2009)
- (China) Qingdao Doublestar (2009–2010)
- (Lebanon) Hekmeh BC (2010–2012)
- (Lebanon) Amchit Club (2012–2013)
- (Lebanon) Champville SC (2013–2014)
- (Lebanon) Hekmeh BC (2015-)
