= ENB Beyrouth =

Lebanese sports club known for its basketball program

ENB Beyrouth sometimes just ENB or E.N.B. (Arabic: نادي أبناء نبتون بيروت), also known in Arabic as Nadi Abnaa' Neptune is a Lebanese sports club. It is located at Beirut, Lebanon. ENB Beyrouth basketball team is part of the Lebanese Basketball League. It has been relegated to play in the lower 1st division.
