= Rodrigue Akl =

Lebanese basketball player (born 1988)

No. 11 – Sagesse SC
- Position: Point guard
- League: Lebanese Basketball League

Personal information
- Born: September 30, 1988 (age 38) Matn District, Lebanon
- Listed height: 6 ft 2 in (1.88 m)
- Listed weight: 180 lb (82 kg)

Career information
- Playing career: 2006–present

Career history
- 2006–2009: Blue Stars
- 2009–2010: Sporting Al Riyadi Beirut
- 2010–2012: Anibal Zahle
- 2012–2016: Hekmeh BC
- 2016: NLEX Road Warriors
- 2016–2020: Byblos Club
- 2020–2023: Beirut Club
- 2023–present: Sagesse SC

Rodrigue Akl (born 30 September 1988) is a Lebanese basketball player for Sagesse SC of the Lebanese Basketball League. He is a six-foot-one-inch tall point guard, and is generally regarded as one of the best players of Lebanon at his position.

== Club career ==
Akl started playing basketball when he was eight years old, playing for Champville SC's youth teams. Akl then made his professional debut when he played for Blue Stars and later signed with Sporting Al Riyadi Beirut for one season and then moved to Anibal Zahle. Akl signed officially with Hekmeh BC in May 2012 for a 4-year contract.

In June 2016, Akl signed with NLEX Road Warriors of the Philippine Basketball Association as the team's Asian import for the 2016 PBA Governors' Cup.

== International career ==
Akl is also a member of the Lebanon national basketball team. He competed with the junior national team at the FIBA Under-19 World Championship 2007. He was called up to the senior team for the first time at the FIBA Asia Championship 2009, where he saw action in four games for the fourth-place Lebanese team.
