= Dion Dixon =

American basketball player (born 1989)

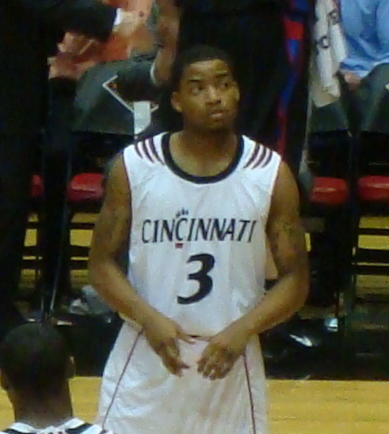
- Dixon with Cincinnati Bearcats

Personal information
- Born: December 24, 1989 (age 36) Chicago, Illinois
- Listed height: 6 ft 3 in (1.91 m)
- Listed weight: 195 lb (88 kg)

Career information
- High school: Crane (Chicago, Illinois)
- College: Cincinnati (2008–2012)
- NBA draft: 2012: undrafted
- Playing career: 2012–present
- Position: Point guard

Career history
- 2012–2013: AEK Larnaca
- 2014: Homenetmen Beirut
- 2014–2015: MZT Skopje
- 2015: Homenetmen Beirut
- 2015: Marinos de Anzoátegui
- 2015–2016: Club Sagesse
- 2016: Marinos de Anzoátegui
- 2017: Kymis
- 2017: Club Africain
- 2017–2018: Al-Ittihad Tripoli
- 2018: Urunday Universitario
- 2018: Indios de San Francisco
- 2018–2019: Obras Sanitarias
- 2019: Al Wahda
- 2020: CD Valdivia
- 2020: Broncos de Caracas
- 2020–2021: Peja

Career highlights
- Cypriot League champion (2013); Venezuelan League champion (2015); Tunisian Federation Cup winner (2017)

Diontae "Dion" Dwayne Dixon (born December 24, 1989) is an American professional basketball player who last played for KB Peja. He played college basketball at the University of Cincinnati.

== College career ==
Dixon played 4 seasons of college basketball at the University of Cincinnati, with the Cincinnati Bearcats. He graduated in 2012 with a criminal justice major. Playing a total of 137 games for the Bearcats, including all 37 games in his senior year, he became the team second best scorer for the final season with 481 points (13.0 ppg) in the Big East conference of the NCAA. He tallied a college career 1,281 points, ranking 22nd in school all-time history.

== Professional career ==
Dixon went undrafted in the 2012 NBA draft. For the 2012–13 season he signed with AEK Larnaca of Cyprus. With AEK he won the Cypriot Championship. In 26 Division A games he recorded 11.4 points, 3.5 rebounds and 2.6 assists per game.

On November 1, 2013, Dixon was selected in the 2013 NBA D-League draft by the Idaho Stampede. However, he was later waived by the Stampede on November 18, 2013.

In February 2014, he signed with Homenetmen Beirut of the Lebanese Basketball League. In 17 games he averaged 23.9 points, 4.5 rebounds and 5.5 assists per game. In Asiabasket.com county awards, he was named "Player of the Year", "Guard of the Year", "Best Import of the Year" and "Best Newcomer" in the website's "All-Lebanese League Awards 2014".

On October 29, 2014, he was signed by Macedonian club MZT Skopje. On February 27, 2015, he was released by MZT. On March 1, 2015, he re-signed with Homenetmen Beirut of the Lebanese Basketball League after a successful spell the year before. On April 28, 2015, he signed with Marinos de Anzoátegui of Venezuela.

In late October 2015, he signed with Club Sagesse in Lebanon. In February 2016, he re-joined the Marinos de Anzoátegui. He left Marinos after appearing in eleven games.

On February 11, 2017, Dixon signed with Kymis for the rest of the 2016–17 Greek Basket League season. On September 29, 2017, he joined Club Africain of the Tunisian League.

In November 2017, he signed with Libyan club Al-Ittihad Tripoli of the Libyan League. moving in 2018 to the Uruguay league playing for the Urunday Universitario. As of 2018, he played for the Indios de San Francisco.
