= Ilias Zouros =

Greek basketball coach

Ilias Zouros OHG
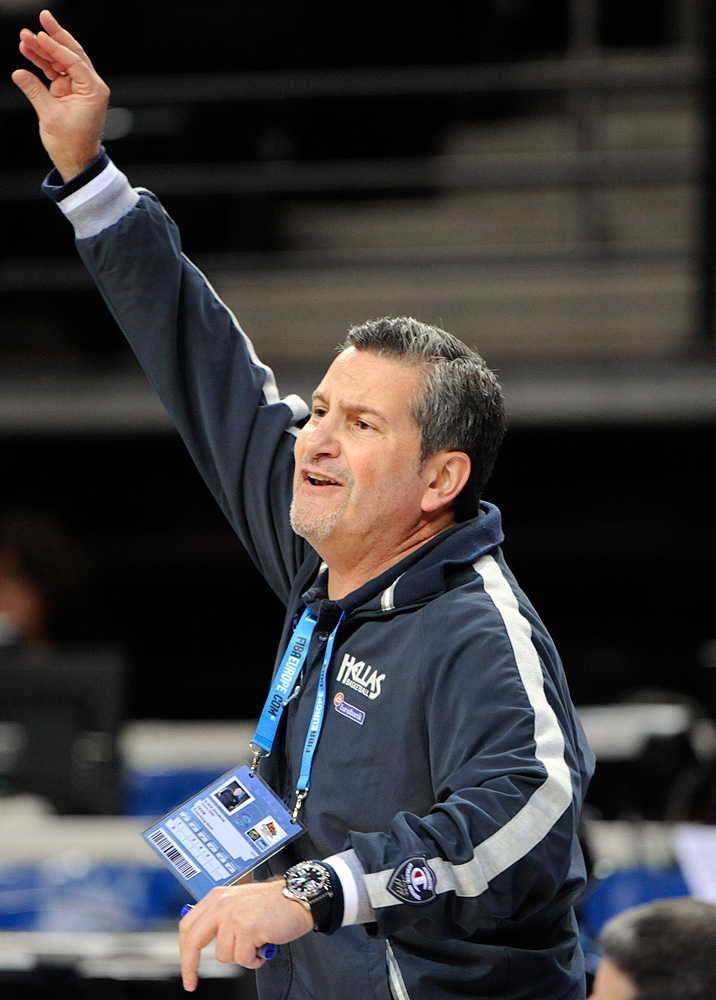
- Ilias Zouros at the EuroBasket 2011

Personal information
- Born: March 11, 1966 (age 60)
- Position: Head coach
- Coaching career: 1986–present

Career history

Coaching
- 1986–1992: Panionios (youth teams)
- 1992–1993: Panionios (assistant)
- 1993–1994: Ethnikos Piraeus (assistant)
- 1995–1996: Palaio Faliro (assistant)
- 1996–1998: Sporting (assistant)
- 1998–1999: Maroussi (assistant)
- 1999–2000: Olympiacos (assistant)
- 2000–2002: Olympiacos
- 2003–2004: Sagesse
- 2004: Peristeri
- 2005–2006: Aris Thessaloniki
- 2006–2007: Paris Basket Racing
- 2007: Paris-Levallois Basket
- 2007–2010: Panellinios
- 2011: Žalgiris Kaunas
- 2011–2012: Greek national team
- 2012: Anadolu Efes
- 2013: Žalgiris Kaunas
- 2014–2015: Tofaş
- 2016–2023: Georgian national team
- 2016–2017: Budućnost Podgorica
- 2019: Peristeri
- 2021–2022: Promitheas Patras
- 2024: AEK Athens
- 2024: Sagesse
- 2024: Maroussi
- 2025: Sagesse Club
- 2025: Panionios

Career highlights
- As head coach: EuroCup Coach of the Year (2010); FIBA Asia Champions Cup champion (2004); Lithuanian League champion (2011); Lithuanian Cup winner (2011); Baltic League champion (2011); Lebanese League champion (2004)

Ilias Zouros (Order of Honor) (Greek: Ηλίας Ζούρος; born March 11, 1966) is a Greek professional basketball coach.

== Club coaching career ==
Some of the teams Zouros has been a head coach of include: Olympiacos Piraeus, Sagesse Beirut, Peristeri Athens, Aris Thessaloniki, Paris Basket Racing, Panellinios Athens, Žalgiris Kaunas, and Efes Istanbul.

He was named the 2010 EuroCup Coach of the Year. He returned to coach Žalgiris Kaunas in 2013. He was fired after a poor start in the season.

On 25 June 2019, he signed with Peristeri of the Greek Basket League. On 29 November 2019, his contract has been terminated by Peristeri.

On 26 January 2024, Zouros signed as head coach of AEK Athens of the Greek Basket League for the rest of the season.

On June 6 2024, Ilias Zouros resigned as head coach Sagesse SC Of the Lebanese Basketball League for the 2024-2025 season.

== National team coaching career ==
=== Greece (2011–2012) ===
Zouros was announced as the new head coach of the senior men's Greek national basketball team in March 2011. He coached Greece at the EuroBasket 2011. After the failure of Greece to qualify for the 2012 Summer Olympics at the 2012 FIBA World Olympic Qualifying Tournament, Zouros' contract to coach the Greek national team was not renewed.

=== Georgia (2016–2023) ===
On 18 February 2016, Zouros was appointed as head coach of the senior men's Georgian national team. He coached Georgia at the EuroBasket 2017 and the EuroBasket 2022. Under Zouros, Georgia made its World Cup debut at the 2023 FIBA Basketball World Cup. In September 2023, Zouros' contract was not renewed, ending his tenure as head coach after nearly eight years.

== Honours ==
=== Head coach ===
Sagesse

- FIBA Asia Champions Cup Champion: (2004)
- Lebanese Basketball League Champion: (2004)

Žalgiris

- Baltic League Champion: (2011)
- Lithuanian League Champion: (2011)
- Lithuanian Cup Winner: (2011)

Budućnost Podgorica

- Montenegrin Cup Winner: (2017)

=== Individual ===
- EuroCup Coach of the Year: (2010)

=== Orders ===
- Order of Honor Georgia: 27 July 2025
