= Billy Pharis =

Lebanese American basketball player

William Pharis (born April 21, 1981) is a Lebanese-American former professional basketball player. Standing at 6 feet 9 inches (2.06 m), he played as a forward.

Pharis played college basketball at the University of Arkansas, where he was a member of the Arkansas Razorbacks men’s basketball team. Following his collegiate career, he played professionally in several countries, including Denmark, where he was a member of the Svendborg Rabbits in the Danish Basketball League.[citation needed]

He also played in Lebanon, most notably for Union Byblos Amchit (UBA). Pharis represented the Lebanon national basketball team in international competition.

== Lebanese national team ==
Pharis joined Lebanon national basketball team in 2010 for the 2010 William Jones Cup in which he averaged 8.17 points, 6.8 rebounds, shooting 55.2% from the floor.
