= Mayrouba Club =

- Leagues: Lebanese Basketball League
- Founded: 2015
- Location: Mayrouba, Lebanon
- Team colors: White & Red
- Head coach: Paul Coughter

Mayrouba Club is a basketball team that plays in the Lebanese Basketball League (LBL). After winning the Lebanese second division basketball championship in 2015–16, they were promoted to the LBL for the 2016–17 season.
