= Amir Saoud =

Lebanese basketball player

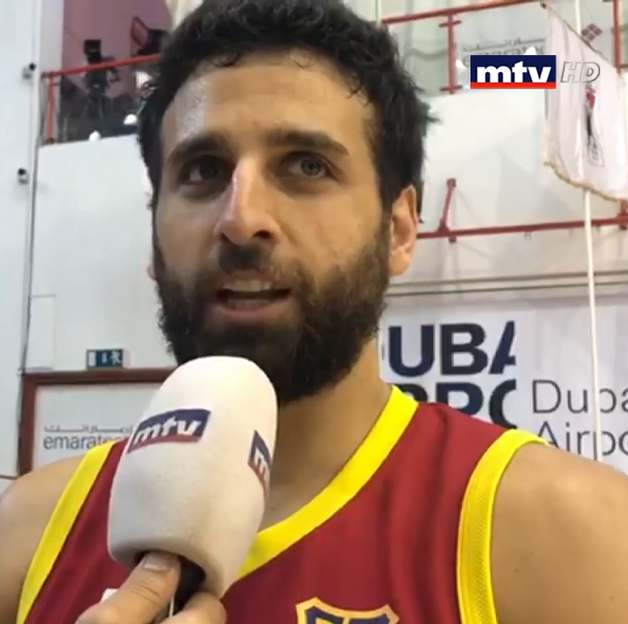

No. 5 – Al Riyadi
- Position: Shooting guard
- League: Lebanese Basketball League

Personal information
- Born: 18 January 1991 (age 35) Beirut, Lebanon
- Listed height: 1.87 m (6 ft 2 in)
- Listed weight: 83 kg (183 lb)

Career information
- Playing career: 2010–present

Career history
- 2009–2010: Hoops Club
- 2010–present: Al Riyadi
- 2023: →Al Wahda

Career highlights
- BCL Asia champion (2011) & BCL Asia champion (2017) & BCL Asia champion (2024)

Amir Saoud (Arabic: أمير سعود, born January 18, 1991) is a Lebanese professional basketball player for Al Riyadi in the Lebanese Basketball League and the Lebanon national team. He started his professional playing career in 2010, playing a season for Hoops Club. Amir often plays in the point guard and shooting guard positions. In 2023, he was loaned out to Syrian club Al Wahda, joining his compatriot coach Marwan Khalil, where he helped his team to achieve the Syrian Basketball League.

== External list ==
- Asia-Basket page
- Profile at RealGM.com
- "Amir SAOUD - FIBA Asia Cup 2022". FIBA.basketball.
