= Ali Mahmoud =

Canadian-Lebanese basketball player

No. 6 – Al Riyadi
- Position: Point guard
- League: Lebanese Basketball League

Personal information
- Born: May 28, 1983 (age 43) Ottawa, Ontario, Canada
- Listed height: 1.84 m (6 ft 0 in)
- Listed weight: 80 kg (176 lb)

Career information
- Playing career: 2003–present

Career history
- 2003–2004: Champville SC
- 2004–2016: Al Riyadi
- 2016–2017: Byblos Club
- 2017–2019: Al Riyadi
- 2020–2023: Dynamo Lebanon
- 2023–2025: Beirut Club
- 2025–present: Champville SC
- 2026–present: Al Riyadi

Career highlights
- 11× Lebanese League champion (2005–2016, 2019); No. 6 retired by Al Riyadi
Medals
Men's basketball
Representing Lebanon
FIBA Asia Championship
Silver medal – second place	2007 Tokushima	Team

Ali Mahmoud (Arabic: علي محمود), sometimes nicknamed Ali Mack, is a Lebanese-Canadian professional basketball player for Al Riyadi of the Lebanese Basketball League.

== Career ==
Mahmoud was born on May 28, 1983, in Ottawa, Ontario, Canada, to Toufic and Gina Mahmoud, Lebanese Shia Muslims who had immigrated to Canada.

He played with St. Patrick's High School Fighting Irish 1999 to 2002 and for one academic year, in 2002-2003, in University of Ottawa Gee-Gees. In 2003, Mahmoud was offered a professional contract by Champville SC, a Lebanese club in Division A. One year later, he moved to another Lebanese club Al Riyadi, where he stayed playing there until 2016. Afterwards, he joined Byblos Club for one year before returning to Al Riyadi.

Mahmoud is also a member of the Lebanon national basketball team that participated in the 2006 FIBA World Championship which took place in Japan and in 2010 FIBA World Championship in Turkey. He is 1.83m and plays as a point guard (PG).

In the 2010 FIBA World Championship, he was the 2nd best stealer.

On January 23, 2013, it was noted in several publications, including FIBA.com, that he would be making his return to national team play and represent Lebanon in upcoming international tournaments.

== Clubs ==
- 2002–2003: Ottawa CIS starting five
- 2003–2004: Champville SC (Lebanon-Div.A, starting five): 6.8ppg, 3.7rpg, 2.9apg, 2.1spg
- 2004–2005: Sporting Al Riyadi Beirut (Lebanon-Div.A): 25 games: 8.7ppg, 5.2rpg, 4.9apg, Steals-1(3.1spg), 2FGP: 58.0%, 3FGP: 37.0%
- 2005–2006: Sporting Al Riyadi Beirut (Lebanon-Div.A)
- 2006–2007: Sporting Al Riyadi Beirut (Div.A): 18 games: 9.8ppg, 5.5rpg, 6.6apg, 2.9spg, 2FGP: 47.2%, 3PT: 32.7%, FT: 67.7%
- 2007–2008: Sporting Al Riyadi Beirut (Lebanon-Div.A): 19 games: 9.6ppg, 6.2rpg, 4.3apg, 2.0spg, 2FGP: 50.0%, 3PT: 37.8%, FT: 51.4%
- 2008–2009: Sporting Al Riyadi Beirut (Lebanon-Div.A, starting five): 23 games: 12.2ppg, 5.9rpg, Assists-1 (6.3apg), 2.0spg, 2FGP-3 (61.8%), 3PT: 30.1%, FT: 56.9%
- 2009–2010: Sporting Al Riyadi Beirut (Lebanon-Div.A, starting five)
- 2010–2011: Sporting Al Riyadi Beirut (Lebanon-Div.A)
- 2011–2012: Sporting Al Riyadi Beirut (Lebanon-Div.A)
- 2012–2013: Sporting Al Riyadi Beirut (Lebanon-Div.A)
- 2013–2014: Sporting Al Riyadi Beirut (Lebanon-Div.A)
- 2015–2016: Sporting Al Riyadi Beirut (Lebanon-Div.A)
- 2016–2017: Byblos Club (Lebanon-Div.A, starting five)
- 2017–2018: Sporting Al Riyadi Beirut (Lebanon-Div.A, runner-up)
- 2018–2019: Sporting Al Riyadi Beirut (Lebanon-Div.A, champion)
- 2022-2023: Dyamo Beirut (Lebanon-Div.A)
- 2023-2025: Beirut Club
- 2025–present: Champville SC

== Awards and achievements ==
- Lebanese Basketball League Champion -2005, 2006, 2007, 2008, 2009, 2010, 2011, 2014
- Asian Championships in Doha -2005 (Silver)
- World Championships in Japan -
- Asia-Basket.com All-Lebanese League Domestic Player of the Year -2009
- Asia-Basket.com All-Arab Club Championships 2nd Team -2009
- World Championships in Turkey - 2nd Best Stealer of the Tournament.
  1. 6 retired by Sporting Al Riyadi Beirut
