= Omar El Turk =

Lebanese Canadian basketball player (born 1981)

Medal record

Men's basketball

Representing Lebanon

FIBA Asia Championship
Silver medal – second place	2005 Doha	Team
Silver medal – second place	2007 Tokushima	Team

Omar El Turk (in Arabic عمر الترك) (born September 30, 1981 in Beirut, Lebanon) is a retired Lebanese Canadian basketball player and member of the Lebanon national basketball team.

El Turk is also a long-time member of the Lebanon national basketball team. He has competed with the team at three Asian championships, helping the team to a silver medal at both the FIBA Asia Championship 2005 and FIBA Asia Championship 2007. He also competed at the 2006 FIBA World Championship for the Lebanese, who finished with a national-best 2-3 record at the tournament.

El Turk also played in Byblos Sporting Club

El Turk was born in Lebanon and his mother was a basketball player. He has two brothers both still living in Canada. Omar el Turk is married to Yasmin Khalil and they have two children.
