= Byblos Club =

Byblos Sporting Club
- Nickname: BYB
- Leagues: Lebanese Basketball League
- Founded: 1981
- History: Byblos Club; 1981–2014; UBA; 2014–2015; Byblos Club; 2015–present
- Arena: President Michel Suleiman Village Stadium
- Capacity: 1500+
- Championships: 1 Lebanese Cup Champions; 1 Super Cup; 2 Henry Chalhoub Tournament
Home	Away

Byblos Club is a multi sports club based in Byblos, Lebanon. The franchise was established in 1981, and such notable players as Jasmon Youngblood, Michael Fraser, Bassel Bawji, Ali Mahmoud, Rodrigue Akl, Ratko Varda, Steven Burtt, Joseph Vogel, Ndudi Ebi, and Ekenechukwu Ibekwe have played for the club throughout its history.

== Franchise history ==
In 2017, Byblos won the Lebanese basketball Division 2 and qualified for the Division 1. In the following year, Byblos won the Division 2 championship and qualified for the first time for the Lebanese Basketball League as part of the 2010–11 Lebanese Basketball League Division 1.

During the 2014–16 FLB Div.A season, Byblos Club was named UBA (Union Byblos Amchit) since Amchit Club's basketball team was part of Byblos Club during that season for obligatory financial reasons. UBA finished the season with 8 win and 0 losses, finishing the league in third. During the playoffs they faced the struggling Tadamon Zouk in a 3–0 swipe, in semi-finals they faced Sagesse Beirut and shocked the Lebanese basketball by swiping Sagesse 4–0 and face Riyadi Beirut in the finals for the first time in their history. the series ended 4–1 to Riyadi Beirut.

The 2015–16 season saw Amchit Basketball club parted ways with Byblos and they were relegated to division 4. Byblos and Sagesse faced each other in the cup final, Byblos defeated Sagesse for the cup and they faced Al Riyadi for super cup against the Lebanese champions. Byblos won the game. Byblos finished the season 8–7. They entered the playoffs. However, they were defeated 3–2 in the quarterfinals of the playoffs by Mouttahed Tripoli.

In 2016–17 season, Byblos finished the season with a 13–5 record. In the playoffs, Byblos beat Tadamon Zouk in the quarterfinals and then faced the defending champions, the Riyadi, who were eliminated 3–1.

After the 2022-23 Lebanese Basketball League, which they finished with a 2-20 record, Byblos would be relegated to 2nd Division for the first time in 10+ years

== Squad ==
Byblos Club roster
Players
Coaches

Pos.	No.	Nat.	Name	Ht.
PG	3	(Lebanon)	Zeinoun, Albert	1.76 m (5 ft 9 in)
SG	21	(Lebanon)	Saade, Rodolph	1.89 m (6 ft 2 in)
SF	22	(Lebanon)	Saad, Charbel	1.96 m (6 ft 5 in)
PF	99	(Lebanon)	Lahoud, Leonel
PG	2	(Lebanon)	Aghnatios, Charbel
SG	9	(Lebanon)	Beyrouthy, Georges	1.88 m (6 ft 2 in)

Head coach

- (Lebanon) Georges Geagea

Assistant coach(es)

- (Lebanon) Georges Yaacoub

Legend

- (C) Team captain
- Injured

=== Depth chart ===
Pos.	Starting 5	Bench 1	Reserves
C
PF		Leonel Lahoud
SF		Charbel Saad
SG		Georges Beyrouthy	Rodolph Saade
PG		Albert Zeinoun	Charbel Aghnatios

== Achievements ==
- Lebanese Basketball Second Division 2 (1): 2009–2010
- Lebanese SuperCup Winner (1): 2016
- Henri Chalhoub Tournament (2): 2015, 2016
