= Antranik Youth Association (basketball) =

Lebanese-Armenian basketball team

Antranik
- Leagues: Lebanese Basketball League
- Founded: 1931
- History: Antranik (1987–present)
- Arena: AGBU Demirdjian Center
- Capacity: 500
- Location: Antelias, Lebanon
- Team colors: Red, blue
- President: Vicken Tcherchian
- Team manager: Roy Chalhoub
- Head coach: Elie Merheb
- Team captain: Gabriel Salibi
- Website: agbulebanon.org

The Antranik Youth Association (AYA) (Arabic: جمعية شباب الأنترانيك; Western Armenian: Անդրանիկ Երիտասարդաց Ընկերակցութիւն), or simply Antranik (Arabic: الأنترانيك; Western Armenian: Անդրանիկ), is a basketball team based in Antelias, Lebanon. It is part of the Antranik Youth Association.

Established in 1987, Antranik's men's and women's basketball teams have been a part of the Lebanese Basketball League for some time. The women's team has secured the Lebanese championship 10 consecutive times from 2002 to 2012 and achieved success in the Arab Women's Club Basketball Championship on multiple occasions.

== Stadium ==
The home games for both men and women are held in the club's own sports center, the AGBU Demirdjian Center, on Autostrade Dbayé, in Antelias, Lebanon. The stadium holds up to 500 seats.

== Honours ==
- Arab Women's Club Basketball Championship
  - Winners (2): 2006, 2007

== Notable Foreigners ==
- (United States) Troy Baxter Jr.
- (United States) Jordan Bruner
