= Tadamon Zouk =

Tadamoun Zouk
- Leagues: Lebanese Division 2
- Founded: 1954
- History: Tadamon Zouk; 1954–present
- Arena: Nouhad Nawfal Stadium
- Location: Kesrouan, Lebanon
- Team colors: Red, Black, Silver, and White
Home	Away

Tadamon Zouk (Arabic: التضامن الزوق) is a Lebanese sports club most known for its basketball program. It is located in Zouk Mikael, Kesrouan, Lebanon.

Tadamon Zouk basketball team is part of the Lebanese Basketball League system. It was part of the league's top division, but as of 2025 has been relegated to 2nd Division.

== History ==
Tadamon Zouk is a Lebanese sports club established in 1954 . It is located at Zouk Mikael, Kesrouan, Lebanon. Tadamon Zouk basketball team is part of the Lebanese Basketball League. It was part of the league's top division, but has been relegated to play in the 2nd division.

Their 2014–2015 season ended when Byblos knocked them out in the Quarterfinal Play-offs 4–0, when the prominent players sat out due to being unpaid for several months due to economic difficulty.

== Players ==
=== Current roster ===
Tadamoun roster
Players
Coaches

Pos.	No.	Nat.	Name	Ht.
SG	23	(United States)	Pledger, Steven	1.93 m (6 ft 4 in)
PG	11	(United States)	Blair, Larry	1.83 m (6 ft 0 in)
PG	3	(Lebanon)	Zaloum, Joseph	1.80 m (5 ft 11 in)
PF	15	(Lebanon)	Hadidian, Gerard	2.04 m (6 ft 8 in)
SG	8	(Lebanon)	Jadayel, Karim	1.91 m (6 ft 3 in)
SF	14	(Lebanon)	Ghaleb, Elie
SG	7	(Lebanon)	Alaaeddine, Salim	1.88 m (6 ft 2 in)
PF	55	(Lebanon)	Arnaout, Alaa	1.98 m (6 ft 6 in)
SF	57	(Lebanon)	El Zein, Frederic	1.96 m (6 ft 5 in)
C	99	(Lebanon)	Abou Karam, Elia
SG	6	(Lebanon)	Abou Jaoude, Farid

Head coach

- (Lebanon) Miodrag Perišić

Assistant coach(es)

- (Lebanon) Joe Mansour

Legend

- (C) Team captain
- Injured

=== Depth chart ===
Pos.	Starting 5	Bench 1	Reserves	Bench 3
C		Elia Abou Karam
PF	Gerard Hadidian	Alaa Arnaout
SF	Steven Pledger	Frederic El Zein
SG		Salim Alaeddine	Karim Jadayel	Farid Abou Jaoude
PG	Larry Blair	Joey Zaloum	Elie Ghalab

== Notable players ==
- (United States) Maurice Kemp
