= Kahraba Zouk =

Lebanese sports club

Kahraba Zouk (Arabic: نادي الكهرباء الزوق) is a Lebanese sports club most known for its basketball program. It is located in Zouk Mikael, Kesrouan, Lebanon. Kahraba Zouk basketball team is sometimes part of the Lebanese Basketball League 1st division and at times second division.

== History ==
The club was founded by Victor Haddad, the father of Olympic fencer Dany Haddad.

The club was known for its basketball. For example, Kahraba's junior men's team won the 1997 Lebanese championship over Sporting Beirut.

== Notable players ==
- (Lebanon) Rony Fahed
