= Sagesse SC =

Multi-sport club

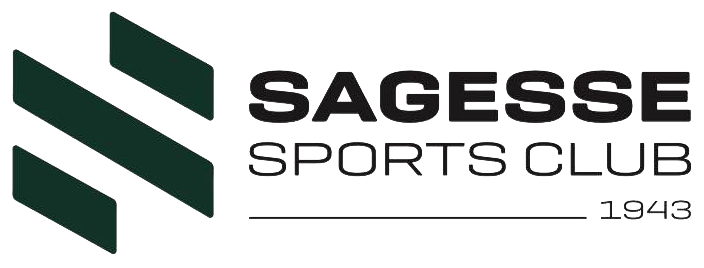
- Full name: Club Sportif La Sagesse
- Nicknames: Hekmeh
- Founded: 1943; 83 years ago
- Based in: Beirut
- Colors: Green and white
- President: Ragheb Haddad

Sagesse Sports Club (French: Club Sportif La Sagesse, lit. 'The Wisdom Sports Club'), known as Hekmeh (Arabic: الحكمة) in Arabic, is a multi-sports club supported primarily by the Maronite Christian community.

== History ==
Hekmeh, or Club Sportif La Sagesse was founded in 1943, under the patronage of the Maronite father Boulos Kike, supported by his excellency Mgr. Jean Maroun, with mainly the football program.

A sports club that represents Collège de la Sagesse founded in 1875 in Achrafieh, a prominent quarter in Beirut, Lebanon.

Al-Hikma in classical Arabic, El-Hekmeh in Lebanese dialect stands for "wisdom", thus also the French alternative name of the club, Sagesse (meaning wisdom in French). Green and white are the colours of the club and the club is popularly known as the Greens. Since its foundation the football club was very popular in Beirut and shined during the golden era of Lebanese football, the club represented Lebanese football worldwide by playing friendlies against notable clubs from around the world.

The club is also very well known for its basketball programme as Hekmeh BC. The basketball club of Hekmeh was founded in 1992, and soon became one of the most successful Lebanese basketball clubs ever with 8 Lebanese Basketball League Championships, 7 Lebanese Basketball Cups, 2 Arab Club Championships, and a record 3 FIBA Asia Champions Cup titles. Hekmeh SC has many other organized individual and collective sports as well under its banner.

In September 2024, Sagesse Sports Club unveiled a new logo to mark a new era in the club’s history. The announcement was made on September 6, 2024, through an official video shared on the team's Facebook and Instagram accounts. Since its introduction, the new logo has been adopted across all official platforms, including the club's official Facebook page and Instagram account. The redesigned logo symbolizes the club's modernization efforts while maintaining its historic identity.
