= Antranik Youth Association =

Lebanese multi-sports club in Antelias

Antranik
- Full name: Antranik Youth Association
- Short name: AYA
- Founded: 1931; 95 years ago
- Based in: Antelias, Lebanon
- Colors: Red and blue

The Antranik Youth Association (AYA) (Arabic: جمعية شباب الأنترانيك; Western Armenian: Անդրանիկ Երիտասարդաց Ընկերակցութիւն), or simply Antranik (Arabic: الأنترانيك; Western Armenian: Անդրանիկ), is a Lebanese-Armenian multi-sports and cultural club based in Antelias, Matn District, Lebanon. Established in Beirut, Lebanon in 1931, it has consisted of various sports departments throughout their history, including basketball, football, cycling, tennis, taekwondo, chess, table tennis, and athletics.

Named after the Armenian military commander Antranik Ozanian, Antranik is the Lebanese section of the Armenian Youth Association (AYA), the sports, cultural, and youth program of the Armenian General Benevolent Union (AGBU). Antranik has branches in Beirut, Antelias, Zahlé, Sin el Fil, and Bourj Hammoud.

== Basketball ==
Founded in 1987, Antranik's men's basketball team have participated multiple times in the Lebanese Basketball League. The women's team have won the league 10 times in a row, between 2002 and 2012, and have been crowned champions of the Arab Women's Club Basketball Championship twice.

== Football ==
Antranik formed its football team in 1931; they were one of the Lebanese Football Association's founding members in 1933. The first team participated in the Lebanese Premier League during the 1930s and 1940s, while their reserve team played in the Lebanese Second Division, winning it in 1940–41. They currently play in the Lebanese Fourth Division.

== Other activities ==
The Lebanese chapter of Antranik also runs numerous cultural activities including its own theatrical group, the Troupe Vahram Papazian, named after the pan-Armenian actor Vahram Papazian. They also run a programme in scouting.
