= Lebanese Basketball League =

Top-tier professional men's basketball league in Lebanon

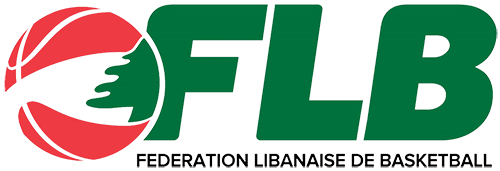
- Organising body: Lebanese Basketball Federation (LFB)
- Founded: 1951; 1992 (Current format)
- First season: 1951–52
- Country: Lebanon
- Confederation: FIBA Asia (Asia)
- Number of teams: 12
- Level on pyramid: 1
- Relegation to: Division 2
- Domestic cup: Lebanese Cup
- International cup(s): Basketball Champions League Asia; FIBA West Asia Super League; Arab Club Basketball Championship
- Current champions: Al Riyadi (39th title) (2025–26)
- Most championships: Al Riyadi (39 titles)
- TV partners: MTV (Lebanon)
- Website: lebanon.basketball
- 2025–26 Lebanese Basketball League

The Lebanese Basketball League, officially Decathlon Lebanese Basketball League for sponsorship reasons, is recognized as the top-tier professional men's basketball league in Lebanon. It is organized annually as a national championship with playoffs and a national cup by the Lebanese Basketball Federation (FLB).

Currently, the league consists of 12 teams, of which six are located in Beirut. The most successful club in the history of the league is Al Riyadi Club Beirut.

== History ==
The initial Lebanese basketball league was formed in as early as the 1950s; however, it was stopped during the Lebanese Civil War. In 1992, the league was reformed into its current fully professional format.

In 1998, Sporting Club (Al Riyadi) finished third in the FIBA Asia Champions Cup, that same year Beirut hosted the Arab Club Championship where Sagesse won, it was the first ever Arab basketball trophy for Lebanon.

In 1999, Beirut hosted the Arab Club Championship, Hekmeh were crowned champions again, in addition to being the first Lebanese and first Arab team to win the Asian cup.

The 1999 season was inaugurated by a huge event that included an exhibition game between Lebanese All-stars (represented by the top four teams Sagesse, Riyadi, Tadamon, and Rosaire) and the Harlem Globetrotters.

== Overview ==
The league is the first division in Lebanese basketball. The team that finishes last each season is relegated to the Second Division, while the Second Division's top four teams compete in a play-off system. The team that wins is promoted for the next season.

== Competition ==
There are 12 teams in the league. They play a round-robin format; each team plays all other teams once home and once away. At the end of the regular season, the top eight teams enter the playoffs and play a best of 5 series in the quarterfinals. The winners of the quarterfinals advance to the best of 5 series in the semifinals. The two teams that advance play a best of seven series in the final, and the winner is the league champion.

== Teams ==
The following 12 teams play in the 2025–26 season.

Team	City	Arena	Capacity
Al Riyadi	Beirut	Saeb Salam Arena	2,500
Antranik	Antelias	AGBU Demirdjian Center	2,000
Antonine	Baabda	Antonine Arena	1,000
Beirut Club	Beirut	Chiyah Stadium	2,500
Champville Maristes	Dik El Mehdi	Champville Club Center	3,500
Club Central Jounieh	Jounieh	Club Central	1,000
Club Jeunesse Sportif Batroun	Batroun	Batroun Sports Club	?
Homenetmen Beirut	Mezher	Adom & Sella Tenjukian stadium	1,000
Hoops Club	Beirut	Rockland Arena	1,500
NSA	Jounieh	Fouad Chehab Stadium	1,200
Sagesse	Ghazir	Antoine Choueiri Stadium	5,000
Tadamon Hrajel	Zouk Mikael	Kahraba Zouk Club Stadium	1,000

Since 1993, 40 teams participated in the League. The list consists of:

1-Al Riyadi Club Beirut (since 1993)

2- Homenetmen Beirut (1993-1996, 1997/98-2000/01, 2004/05, since 2013/14)

3- Anibal Zahle (1993, 1995, 1996/97-2012/13, 2019/20-2021/22)

4- Tadamon Zouk (1993-2001/02, 2013/14-2017/18)

5- Kahraba Zouk (1993-2002/03, 2008/09-2009/10)

6- Club Jeunesse Meziara (1993-1996, 1997/98-2000/01)

7- Club Central Jounieh (1993-1996, 2001/02-2002/03, since 2024/25)

8- Mont La Salle Club (1993-1997/98)

9- Taadod Club Beirut (1993-1996/97)

10-ENB Beyrouth (1993-1995, 1996/97)

11-Hawch Sour (1993, 1999/2000)

12-Club Carmelite (1993)

13-Sagesse BC (since 1994)

14-Antranik Youth Association (1994-2012/13, since 2021/22)

15-Rosaire Club Mansouriyeh (1994-1999/2000)

16-Beit Mery Club (1994, 1996/97-1998/99)

17-Animation Club Zouk (1994-1995, 1996/97)

18-Ghazir Club (1995, 1996/97, 2002/03)

19-Abnaa Khalij Jounieh (1995-1996)

20-Jamhour Blue Stars (1996/97, 2000/01-2008/09)

21-Shabeb Ghobeiry (1996/97-1997/98)

22-CS Maristes (since 1998/99)

23-Rabta Club Chekka (1998/99)

24-Sadaka SC (1999/2000-2002/03)

25-Café Najjar (2003/04)

26-Feytroun Club (2004/05-2005/06, 2007/08-2008/09)

27-Mouttahed Club (2005/06-2020/21)

28-Club Sportif Antonin (2006/07, 2017/18, since 2023/24)

29-Tebnin SC/Dynamo Beirut (2008/09, 2021/22-2022/23)

30-Hoops Club (2009/10-2016/17, since 2018/19)

31-Byblos Club (2010/11-2022/23)

32-Chabibet Haouch el Oumara (2010/11-2011/12)

33-Bejjeh Club (2011/12-2013/14)

34-Club Amchit (2012/13-2013/14)

35-Club Louaize/Leaders Club (2015/16-2017/18, 2022/23)

36-Mayrouba SC (2016/17, 2023/24-2024/25)

37-Beirut Club (since 2017/18)

38-Club Atlas Ferzol (2018/19-2022/23)

39-NSA Club (since 2022/23)

40-Tadamon Hrajel (since 2024/25)

41-Club Jeunesse Sportif Batroun (2025-2026)

== Champions ==
=== Wins by year ===
FLB League (standings since 1993)

Season	Champion	Runner-up
1992–1993	Al Riyadi	Kahraba Zouk
1993–1994	Sagesse	Kahraba Zouk
1994–1995	Al Riyadi (2)	Kahraba Zouk
1995–1996	League Cancelled	
1996–1997	Al Riyadi (3)	Tadamon Zouk
1997–1998	Sagesse (2)	Tadamon Zouk
1998–1999	Sagesse (3)	Tadamon Zouk
1999–2000	Sagesse (4)	Antranik Beirut
2000–2001	Sagesse (5)	Al Riyadi
2001–2002	Sagesse (6)	Champville
2002–2003	Sagesse (7)	Al Riyadi
2003–2004	Sagesse (8)	Champville
2004–2005	Al Riyadi (4)	Sagesse
2005–2006	Al Riyadi (5)	Sagesse
2006–2007	Al Riyadi (6)	Blue Stars
2007–2008	Al Riyadi (7)	Mouttahed
2008–2009	Al Riyadi (8)	Mouttahed
2009–2010	Al Riyadi (9)	Champville
2010–2011	Al Riyadi (10)	Champville
2011–2012	Champville	Anibal
2012–2013	League Cancelled	
2013–2014	Al Riyadi (11)	Sagesse
2014–2015	Al Riyadi (12)	Byblos Club
2015–2016	Al Riyadi (13)	Sagesse
2016–2017	Al Riyadi (14)	Homenetmen
2017–2018	Homenetmen	Al Riyadi
2018–2019	Al Riyadi (15)	Beirut Club
2019–2020	League Cancelled	
2020–2021	Al Riyadi (16)	Champville
2021–2022	Beirut Club	Al Riyadi
2022–2023	Al Riyadi (17)	Dynamo
2023–2024	Al Riyadi (18)	Sagesse
2024–2025	Al Riyadi (19)	Sagesse
2025–2026	Al Riyadi (20)	Sagesse

=== Wins by team ===
Club	Titles	Runners-up	Seasons won	Seasons runner-up
Al Riyadi	39	4	1950–51, 1951–52, 1952–53, 1953–54, 1955–56, 1956–57, 1958–59, 1959–60, 1960–61, 1961–62, 1962–63, 1963–64, 1964–65, 1967–68, 1968–69, 1969–70, 1970–71, 1971–72, 1972–73, 1992–93, 1994–95, 1996–97, 2004–05, 2005–06, 2006–07, 2007–08, 2008–09, 2009–10, 2010–11, 2013–14, 2014–15, 2015–16, 2016–17, 2018–19, 2020–21, 2022–23, 2023–24, 2024–25, 2025–26	2000–01, 2002–03, 2017–18, 2021–22
Sagesse	8	7	1993–94, 1997–98, 1998–99, 1999–00, 2000–01, 2001–02, 2002–03, 2003–04	2004–05, 2005–06, 2013–14, 2015–16, 2023–24, 2024–25, 2025–26
Champville	1	5	2011–12	2001–02, 2003–04, 2009–10, 2010–11, 2020–21
Homenetmen	1	1	2017–18	2016–17
Beirut	1	1	2021–22	2018–19
Aamal Bikfaya	1	0	1991–92	
Kahraba Zouk	0	3		1992–93, 1993–94, 1994–95
Tadamon Zouk	0	3		1996–97, 1997–98, 1998–99
Mouttahed	0	2		2007–08, 2008–09
Antranik Beirut	0	1		1999–2000
Blue Stars	0	1		2006–07
Anibal	0	1		2011–12
Byblos	0	1		2014–15
Dynamo	0	1		2022–23

== Rivalries ==
Beirut derby

- Al Riyadi vs Sagesse Club

Other rivalries

- Al Riyadi vs Champville
- Homenetmen Beirut vs Al Riyadi
- Champville vs Sagesse Club
- Tadamon Zouk vs Sagesse Club
- Antranik vs Homenetmen Beirut
- Tadamon Zouk vs Kahraba Zouk

== Notable players ==
- (Lebanon) Al Hassan Dandache
- (Lebanon) Bassel Bawji
- (Lebanon) Rony Fahed
- (Lebanon) Hayk Gyokchyan
- (Lebanon) Nadim Souaid
- (Lebanon) Roy Samaha
- (Lebanon) Ali Haidar
- (Lebanon) Elie Stephan
- (Lebanon) Elie Rustom
- (Lebanon) Elie Mechantaf
- (Lebanon) Ali Mezher
- (Lebanon) Wael Arakji
- (Lebanon) Mohammad Ibrahim
- (Lebanon) Ahmad Ibrahim
- (Lebanon) Amir Saoud
- (Lebanon) Fadi El Khatib
- (Lebanon) Joe Vogel
- (Lebanon) Ali Mahmoud
- (Lebanon) Brian Beshara
- (Lebanon) Jean Abdelnour
- (Lebanon) Sabah Khoury
- (Lebanon) Omar El Turk
- (Lebanon) Anthony Khoury
- (Lebanon) Billy Pharis
- (Lebanon) Ghaleb Rida
- (Lebanon) Ali Kanaan
- (Lebanon) Billy Pharis
- (Lebanon) Jason Azzi
- (Lebanon) Daniel Faris
- (Lebanon) Charbel Kassis
- (Lebanon) Matt Freije
- (Nigeria) / (United States) Ekene Ibekwe
- (Australia) (South Sudan) Duop Reath
- (United States) Jean-Paul Afif
- (United States) Samaki Walker
- (United States) Cliff Alexander
- (United States) Kerwin Roach
- (United States) Hassan Whiteside
- (United States) Shabazz Muhammad
- (United States) Rashad McCants
- (United States) Jeremy Pargo
- (United States) Norvel Pelle
- (United States) Isaiah Austin
- (United States) Danny Pippen
- (United States) JJ Hickson
- (United States) Mike Taylor (basketball player)
- (United States) Troy Williams
- (United States) Diamond Stone
- (United States) Zach Lofton
- (United States) Kevin Murphy (basketball)
- (United States) Ace Custis
- (United States) DeWayne Jackson
- (United States) Patrick Rembert
- (United States) Dion Dixon
- (United States) Corey Williams
- (United States) Brian Cook
- (United States) Tony Madison
- (United States) Alvin Sims
- (United States) C.J. Giles
- (United States) Darryl Watkins
- (United States) Lee Nailon
- (United States) Herbert Hill
- (United States) Jumaine Jones
- (United States) Loren Woods
- (United States) Priest Lauderdale
- (United States) Dewarick Spencer
- (United States) Flip Murray
- (United States) Desmond Penigar
- (United States) Rasheim Wright
- (United States) Marcus Haislip
- (United States) Harold Jamison
- (United States) Andre Emmett
- (United States) Nate Johnson
- (United States) Marc Salyers
- (United States) Earl Barron
- (United States) Scotty Thurman
- (United States) Rick Hughes
- (United States) DeShawn Sims
- (United States) Aaron Harper
- (United States) LeRoy Hurd
- (United States) Tre Kelley
- (United States) Sam Hoskin
- (United States) Quincy Douby
- (United States) Ronnie Fields
- (United States) Willie Burton
- (United States) Marlon Parmer
- (United States) Booker Woodfox
- (United States) Reyshawn Terry
- (United States) DerMarr Johnson
- (United States) Rashad Anderson
- (United States) Jerald Honeycutt
- (United States) Terrell Stoglin
- (United States) Dickey Simpkins
- (United States) Cedric Henderson
- (United States) Jeremiah Massey
- (United States) Ruben Patterson
- (United States) Sherell Ford
- (United States) Jamal Robinson
- (United States) Nate Robinson
- (United States) Jonathan Gibson
- (United States) Cleanthony Early
- (United States) (Serbia) Nick Rakocevic
- (United States) (Jordan) Dar Tucker
- (Australia) (South Sudan) (Lebanon) Ater Majok
- (Bosnia and Herzegovina) Aleksandar Radojević
- (Sierra Leone) (Libya) Alpha Bangura
- (Egypt) Ismail Ahmad
- (Tunisia) Salah Mejri
- (France) Ali Traore
- (Nigeria) Ndudi Ebi
- (Georgia (country)) Nikoloz Tskitishvili
- (Nigeria) Jeleel Akindele
- (Croatia) Dalibor Bagarić
- (Iran) Asghar Kardoust
- (Iran) Hamed Haddadi
- (Serbia) Ratko Varda
- (Serbia) Vladan Vukosavljević
- (Palestine) Sani Sakakini
- (Syria) Michael Madanly
- (United States) Marcus Banks
- (United States Virgin Islands) Walter Hodge
- (Tunisia) Makrem Ben Romdhane
- (United States) Sam Young (basketball)
- (United States) (Lebanon) Rony Seikaly
- (United States) (Philippines) Justin Brownlee
- (Australia) (South Sudan) Thon Maker

== Notable coaches ==
- (Lebanon) Ghassan Sarkis
- (Lebanon) Ahmad Farran
- (Slovenia) Slobodan Subotić
- (Greece) Ilias Zouros
- (Serbia) Nenad Vucinic
- (Serbia) Veselin Matic
- (Serbia) Dragan Raca
- (United States) Tab Baldwin
