= Anibal Zahle =

- Leagues: Lebanese Basketball League
- Founded: 1958
- Arena: Antonins Sister School
- Location: Zahle, Lebanon
- Team colors: White, Black, and Dark Blue
- Championships: 1 Lebanese Cup Champions
Home	Away

Anibal Zahle (Arabic: أنيبال زحلة) is a Lebanese sports club most known for its basketball program. It is located Zahlé, Lebanon. In 2012–2013 season, Anibal was relegated to Division 2 and finished 10th. In 2013–2014 season, Anibal was relegated to Division 3. In 2018–2019 season, Anibal won the second division title and were back in the first division starting 2019–2020 season.

== Achievements ==
- Lebanese Cup Winner (1): 2012
- Dubai International Basketball Tournament (1): 2012
- Lebanese Basketball League Second Division (1) : 2019
