= Amchit Club =

- Leagues: FLBB/FLVB
- Founded: 1955
- Arena: Amchit club
- Location: Amchit, Lebanon
- Team colors
- Championships: FLVB (2nd Div), FLBB (2nd Div)
Home	Away

Amchit Club (Arabic: نادي عمشيت Nadi Amchit) is a Lebanese multi-sports club best known for its basketball team which competes in the Lebanese Basketball League.

== Description ==
After several seasons in lower divisions, Amchit Club Basketball team was back on the winning track, but starting again from Division Three in the season 2020-2021, the team finished the championship in 3rd position, while in the season 2021-2022 Amchit Club was crowned as the third division Champions and got promoted to first Division.
