= Al Mouttahed Tripoli =

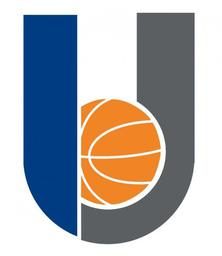
- Nickname: United
- Leagues: Lebanese Basketball League
- Founded: 1987
- Arena: Safadi Sports and Cultural Center
- Capacity: 200
- Location: Tripoli, Lebanon
- Team colors: Blue and white
| Home | Away |

Al Mouttahed (Arabic: المتحد طرابلس) also known as United Club Tripoli, is a Lebanese sports club established in 1987. Based in Tripoli, Lebanon, it is best known for its basketball team. As of 2026, the men's team plays in the second division of the Lebanese Basketball League.

== Notable players ==
Past players for United Club Tripoli have included:

- Elie Rustom, former international player for the Lebanon men's national basketball team, was a guard for Mouttahed Tripoli.
- Hassan Whiteside, who went on to play for the Miami Heat in the NBA, played for Al Mouttahed in 2014.
