= Hoops Club =

Lebanese sports club

- Leagues: Lebanese Basketball League
- Founded: 2001
- History: Hoops Club; 2001–present
- Arena: Rockland Arena
- Location: Beirut, Lebanon
- Team colors: Blue, Orange, White
- Main sponsor: Suzuki
- Head coach: Gilbert Nasr
- Website: www.hoops-club.com
Home	Away

Hoops Club (Arabic: نادي هوبس) is a Lebanese professional sports club founded in 2001,. It is based in Beirut, Lebanon, with branches in Antelias, Tyre, and southern suburbs of Beirut (Dahieh). The club is best known for its basketball team, which competes in the Lebanese Basketball League (LBL), the top division. The basketball team joined the Lebanese Basketball League Division A by the 2009–10 season.

== Squad ==
Hoops Club roster
Players
Coaches

Pos.	No.	Nat.	Name	Ht.	Age
PG	0	(Lebanon)	Yves Daaboul, Georges	1.78 m (5 ft 10 in)	30 – 1 November 1995
G	1	(Lebanon)	Hachem, Rayan	1.96 m (6 ft 5 in)	21 – 2 July 2005
SG	3	(United States)	Randolph, Brandon	1.87 m (6 ft 2 in)	31 – 26 May 1995
PF	7	(Lebanon)	Ekkawi, Ahmad	2.01 m (6 ft 7 in)	35 – 3 September 1991
G/F	8	(Lebanon)	Atwi, Abbas	1.94 m (6 ft 4 in)	21 – 5 October 2005
F	10	(Lebanon)	Abdallah, Habib	1.96 m (6 ft 5 in)	33 – 13 October 1993
G	12	(Australia)	Kordahi, James	1.89 m (6 ft 2 in)	20 – 10 February 2006
G	14	(Lebanon)	Mansour, Bryan	1.88 m (6 ft 2 in)	22 – 9 October 2004
SG	16	(Lebanon)	El Helou, Hicham	1.90 m (6 ft 3 in)	29 – 2 June 1997
G	22	(Lebanon)	Habib, Antonio	1.85 m (6 ft 1 in)	22 – 22 December 2003
F	24	(United States)	Cole, Keenon	2.01 m (6 ft 7 in)	26 – 22 September 2000
PG	32	(Lebanon)	Sawma, Johnny	1.85 m (6 ft 1 in)	17 – 3 July 2009
F/C	35	(Mali)	Diarra, Mamoudou	2.07 m (6 ft 9 in)	29 – 4 October 1997
F/C	44	(Lebanon)	Hdayed, Ghassan	2.03 m (6 ft 8 in)	30 – 1 January 1996

Head coach

- (Lebanon) Gilbert Nasr

Assistant coach(es)

- (Greece) Chris Tsimpos
- (Lebanon) Hussein Mohsen

Physiotherapist(s)

- (Lebanon) Michel Deaibes
- (Lebanon) Paul Saade

Legend

- (C) Team captain
- Injured

- Roster
Updated: 2026 October 1

=== Depth chart ===
Pos.	Starting 5	Bench 1	Bench 2
C	Mamoudou Diarra		Ghassan Hdayed
PF	Keenon Cole	Ahmad Ekkawi	Habib Abdallah
SF	Rayan Hachem	Abbas Atwi	James Kordahi
SG	Brandon Randolph	Hicham El Helou	Johnny Sawma
PG	Georges Yves Daaboul	Bryan Mansour	Antonio Habib
