= 2011 FIBA Asia Championship squads =

These are the team rosters of the 16 teams competing in the 2011 FIBA Asia Championship.

== Group A ==
=== India ===
Head coach: (United States) Kenny Natt

#	Pos	Name	Club	Date of Birth	Height
4	C	Amjyot Singh	(India) Punjab Police	27 January 1992 (aged 19)	2.03 m (6 ft 8 in)
5	C	Satnam Singh Bhamara	(United States) IMG Academy	10 December 1995 (aged 15)	2.16 m (7 ft 1 in)
6	G	Hareesh Koroth	(India) Tamil Nadu	12 November 1984 (aged 26)	1.86 m (6 ft 1 in)
7	G	Prakash Mishra	(India) Indian Railways	5 August 1982 (aged 29)	1.80 m (5 ft 11 in)
8	G	Dishant Vipul Shah	(India) Gujarat	13 January 1992 (aged 19)	1.80 m (5 ft 11 in)
9	F	Vishesh Bhriguvanshi	(India) Indian Railways	13 September 1991 (aged 20)	1.92 m (6 ft 3 1/2 in)
10	C	Amritpal Singh	(India) Punjab Police	5 January 1991 (aged 20)	2.08 m (6 ft 10 in)
11	G	Narender Grewal	(India) Services	25 June 1988 (aged 23)	1.84 m (6 ft 1/2 in)
12	F	Trideep Rai	(India) Uttarakhand	4 July 1983 (aged 28)	1.90 m (6 ft 3 in)
13	G	Talwinderjit Singh	(India) Punjab Police	20 October 1986 (aged 24)	1.85 m (6 ft 1 in)
14	F	Yadwinder Singh	(India) Indian Railways	30 December 1986 (aged 24)	1.98 m (6 ft 6 in)
15	F	Jagdeep Singh	(India) Punjab Police	10 January 1986 (aged 25)	1.96 m (6 ft 5 in)

=== South Korea ===
Head coach: Hur Jae

#	Pos	Name	Club	Date of Birth	Height
4	G	Park Chan-hee	(South Korea) Anyang KGC	17 April 1987 (aged 24)	1.90 m (6 ft 3 in)
5	G	Lee Jung-suk	(South Korea) Seoul Samsung Thunders	6 July 1982 (aged 29)	1.85 m (6 ft 1 in)
6	G	Yang Dong-geun	(South Korea) Ulsan Mobis Phoebus	14 September 1981 (aged 30)	1.83 m (6 ft 0 in)
7	G	Kang Byung-hyun	(South Korea) Jeonju KCC Egis	3 March 1985 (aged 26)	1.92 m (6 ft 3 1/2 in)
8	F	Moon Tae-jong	(South Korea) Incheon ET Land Elephants	1 December 1975 (aged 35)	2.00 m (6 ft 6 1/2 in)
9	F	Kim Young-hwan	(South Korea) Busan KT Sonicboom	5 July 1984 (aged 27)	1.95 m (6 ft 5 in)
10	F	Cho Sung-min	(South Korea) Busan KT Sonicboom	23 December 1983 (aged 27)	1.89 m (6 ft 2 1/2 in)
11	F	Yang Hee-jong	(South Korea) Anyang KGC	11 May 1984 (aged 27)	1.94 m (6 ft 4 1/2 in)
12	C	Kim Joo-sung	(South Korea) Wonju Dongbu Promy	9 November 1979 (aged 31)	2.05 m (6 ft 8 1/2 in)
13	C	Ha Seung-jin	(South Korea) Jeonju KCC Egis	4 August 1985 (aged 26)	2.21 m (7 ft 3 in)
14	C	Oh Se-keun	(South Korea) Anyang KGC	20 May 1987 (aged 24)	2.00 m (6 ft 6 1/2 in)
15	C	Kim Jong-Kyu	(South Korea) Kyung Hee University	3 July 1991 (aged 20)	2.07 m (6 ft 9 1/2 in)

=== Lebanon ===
Head coach: Ghassan Sarkis

#	Pos	Name	Club	Date of Birth	Height
4	F	Jean Abdelnour	(Lebanon) Al-Riyadi Beirut	29 November 1983 (aged 27)	1.98 m (6 ft 6 in)
5	G	Miguel Martinez	(Lebanon) Champville	30 January 1988 (aged 23)	1.90 m (6 ft 3 in)
6	G	Ghaleb Rida	(Lebanon) Sagesse	10 July 1981 (aged 30)	1.92 m (6 ft 3 1/2 in)
7	C	Sam Hoskin	(Iran) Shahrdari Gorgan	29 December 1979 (aged 31)	2.06 m (6 ft 9 in)
8	F	Aboudy El Farkh	(Lebanon) Champville	17 January 1993 (aged 18)	2.02 m (6 ft 7 1/2 in)
9	G	Elie Stephan	(Lebanon) Sagesse	20 July 1986 (aged 25)	1.91 m (6 ft 3 in)
10	F	Jad Bitar	(Lebanon) Al-Moutahed Tripoli	8 April 1988 (aged 23)	2.04 m (6 ft 8 1/2 in)
11	G	Rodrigue Akl	(Lebanon) Anibal Zahle	30 September 1988 (aged 22)	1.90 m (6 ft 3 in)
12	C	Ali Kanaan	(Lebanon) Antranik	1 December 1985 (aged 25)	2.06 m (6 ft 9 in)
13	F	Bassel Bawji	(Lebanon) Al-Moutahed Tripoli	26 December 1989 (aged 21)	2.03 m (6 ft 8 in)
14	F	Charles Tabet	(Lebanon) Anibal Zahle	1 July 1987 (aged 24)	2.06 m (6 ft 9 in)
15	G	Mohammed Ibrahim	(Lebanon) Champville	10 April 1983 (aged 28)	1.95 m (6 ft 5 in)

=== Malaysia ===
Head coach: Goh Cheng Huat

#	Pos	Name	Club	Date of Birth	Height
4	G	Soo Eng Heng	(Malaysia) Segamat	4 April 1984 (aged 27)	1.82 m (5 ft 11 1/2 in)
5	G	Lau Bik Ing	(Malaysia) Bintulu Rainbow	20 July 1978 (aged 33)	1.80 m (5 ft 11 in)
6	G	Wee Chuan Chin	(Malaysia) Westports KL Dragons	27 May 1984 (aged 27)	1.80 m (5 ft 11 in)
7	F	Ooi Ban Sin	(Malaysia) Westports KL Dragons	29 October 1983 (aged 27)	1.80 m (5 ft 11 in)
8	F	Chin Zhi Shin	(Malaysia) Westports KL Dragons	16 March 1987 (aged 24)	1.90 m (6 ft 3 in)
9	F	Satyaseelan Kuppusamy	(Malaysia) Westports KL Dragons	25 June 1978 (aged 33)	1.83 m (6 ft 0 in)
10	G	Guganeswaran Batumalai	(Malaysia) Westports KL Dragons	26 May 1982 (aged 29)	1.82 m (5 ft 11 1/2 in)
11	G	Loh Shee Fai	(Malaysia) Westports KL Dragons	16 January 1989 (aged 22)	1.92 m (6 ft 3 1/2 in)
12	F	John Ng	(Malaysia) Westports KL Dragons	30 August 1981 (aged 30)	1.93 m (6 ft 4 in)
13	C	Kuek Tian Yuan	(Malaysia) Westports KL Dragons	3 August 1991 (aged 20)	2.00 m (6 ft 6 1/2 in)
14	C	Kwaan Yoong Jing	(Malaysia) Westports KL Dragons	13 July 1990 (aged 21)	2.00 m (6 ft 6 1/2 in)
15	C	Chee Li Wei	(Malaysia) Westports KL Dragons	16 September 1983 (aged 27)	1.98 m (6 ft 6 in)

== Group B ==
=== Chinese Taipei ===
Head coach: Chou Jun-san

#	Pos	Name	Club	Date of Birth	Height
4	C	Tseng Wen-ting	(Japan) Osaka Evessa	6 July 1984 (aged 27)	2.02 m (6 ft 7 1/2 in)
5	F	Chien Chia-hung	(Chinese Taipei) Pure-Youth Construction	6 March 1987 (aged 24)	1.97 m (6 ft 5 1/2 in)
6	G	Lee Hsueh-lin	(China) Beijing Ducks	31 January 1984 (aged 27)	1.75 m (5 ft 9 in)
7	F	Mao Chia-en	(Chinese Taipei) Pure-Youth Construction	16 November 1982 (aged 28)	1.96 m (6 ft 5 in)
8	C	Wu Tai-hao	(Chinese Taipei) Taiwan Beer	7 February 1985 (aged 26)	2.02 m (6 ft 7 1/2 in)
9	G	Chen Shih-nien	(Chinese Taipei) Taiwan Beer	8 April 1984 (aged 27)	1.80 m (5 ft 11 in)
10	G	Su I-chieh	(Chinese Taipei) Taiwan Mobile	28 January 1987 (aged 24)	1.81 m (5 ft 11 1/2 in)
11	F	Chen Hsin-an	(China) Dongguan Leopards	1 July 1980 (aged 31)	1.98 m (6 ft 6 in)
12	F	Lin Chih-chieh	(China) Zhejiang Lions	11 June 1982 (aged 29)	1.92 m (6 ft 3 1/2 in)
13	F	Lu Cheng-ju	(Chinese Taipei) Yulon Dinos	13 April 1986 (aged 25)	1.94 m (6 ft 4 1/2 in)
14	F	Ho Shou-cheng	(Chinese Taipei) Taiwan Beer	15 May 1983 (aged 28)	1.96 m (6 ft 5 in)
15	G	Chang Tsung-hsien	(United States) BYU-Hawaii	27 December 1988 (aged 22)	1.90 m (6 ft 3 in)

=== Iran ===
Head coach: (Serbia) Veselin Matić

#	Pos	Name	Club	Date of Birth	Height
4	F	Saeid Davarpanah	(Iran) Towzin Electric Kashan	7 September 1987 (aged 24)	1.90 m (6 ft 3 in)
5	G	Aren Davoudi	(Iran) Zob Ahan Isfahan	12 July 1986 (aged 25)	1.80 m (5 ft 11 in)
6	G	Javad Davari	(Iran) Mahram Tehran	25 April 1983 (aged 28)	1.86 m (6 ft 1 in)
7	G	Mehdi Kamrani	(Iran) Mahram Tehran	1 June 1982 (aged 29)	1.80 m (5 ft 11 in)
8	G	Mehrad Atashi	(Iran) Mahram Tehran	25 February 1986 (aged 25)	1.91 m (6 ft 3 in)
9	F	Arsalan Kazemi	(United States) Rice University	22 April 1990 (aged 21)	2.03 m (6 ft 8 in)
10	G	Hamed Afagh	(Iran) Zob Ahan Isfahan	1 February 1983 (aged 28)	1.94 m (6 ft 4 1/2 in)
11	F	Oshin Sahakian	(Iran) Zob Ahan Isfahan	21 March 1986 (aged 25)	2.01 m (6 ft 7 in)
12	C	Asghar Kardoust	(Iran) Rah & Tarabari Qom	21 March 1986 (aged 25)	2.12 m (6 ft 11 1/2 in)
13	F	Hamed Sohrabnejad	(Iran) Petrochimi Bandar Imam	7 May 1983 (aged 28)	2.06 m (6 ft 9 in)
14	F	Samad Nikkhah Bahrami	(Iran) Mahram Tehran	11 May 1983 (aged 28)	1.98 m (6 ft 6 in)
15	C	Hamed Haddadi	(United States) Memphis Grizzlies	19 May 1985 (aged 26)	2.18 m (7 ft 2 in)

=== Qatar ===
Head coach: Ali Fakhroo

#	Pos	Name	Club	Date of Birth	Height
7	G	Saad Abdulrahman	(Qatar) Al-Sadd	2 May 1985 (aged 26)	1.93 m (6 ft 4 in)
9	F	Ali Turki	(Qatar) Al-Arabi	10 January 1982 (aged 29)	2.00 m (6 ft 6 1/2 in)
10	F	Khalid Abdalla Adam	(Qatar) Al-Gharafa	27 February 1993 (aged 18)	2.00 m (6 ft 6 1/2 in)
11	F	Erfan Ali Saeed	(Qatar) Al-Rayyan	20 December 1983 (aged 27)	1.98 m (6 ft 6 in)
13	F	Hammam Omer	(Qatar) Al-Wakrah	15 September 1983 (aged 28)	2.00 m (6 ft 6 1/2 in)
14	F	Abdullah Matalkeh	(Qatar) Al-Rayyan	8 March 1991 (aged 20)	1.98 m (6 ft 6 in)
15	C	Omer Abdelqader	(Qatar) Al-Gharafa	1 October 1983 (aged 27)	2.05 m (6 ft 8 1/2 in)

=== Uzbekistan ===
Head coach: Oleg Levin

#	Pos	Name	Club	Date of Birth	Height
4	G	Evgeniy Shatrov		11 May 1986 (aged 25)	1.93 m (6 ft 4 in)
5	F	Hurmatjon Nuraliev		1 April 1981 (aged 30)	2.01 m (6 ft 7 in)
6	C	Zinnur Khabibullin	(Uzbekistan) MHSK Tashkent	3 July 1974 (aged 37)	2.05 m (6 ft 8 1/2 in)
7	F	Aleksandr Kozlov	(Uzbekistan) FSK Sogdiana	24 September 1982 (aged 28)	2.02 m (6 ft 7 1/2 in)
8	G	Viacheslav Denisov	(Ukraine) Dynamo Dnipropetrovsk	21 February 1983 (aged 28)	1.90 m (6 ft 3 in)
9	F	Nail Kadirov		13 March 1989 (aged 22)	2.00 m (6 ft 6 1/2 in)
10	F	Samandar Juginisov	(Uzbekistan) FSK Sogdiana	29 March 1987 (aged 24)	2.02 m (6 ft 7 1/2 in)
11	F	Gennadiy Zinovev	(Uzbekistan) FSK Sogdiana	29 July 1984 (aged 27)	1.98 m (6 ft 6 in)
12	C	Aleksandr Yahin		24 February 1989 (aged 22)	2.06 m (6 ft 9 in)
13	G	Evgeniy Pereverzev		20 October 1987 (aged 23)	1.78 m (5 ft 10 in)
14	F	Vyacheslav Belokurov	(Uzbekistan) FSK Sogdiana	20 November 1977 (aged 33)	2.02 m (6 ft 7 1/2 in)
15	F	Denis Timofeev		12 February 1992 (aged 19)	2.02 m (6 ft 7 1/2 in)

== Group C ==
=== Indonesia ===
Head coach: Rastafari Horongbala

#	Pos	Name	Club	Date of Birth	Height
4	G	Xaverius Prawiro	(Indonesia) Dell Aspac Jakarta	30 December 1986 (aged 24)	1.84 m (6 ft 1/2 in)
5	F	Andi Poedjakesuma	(Indonesia) Pelita Jaya Esia	8 November 1980 (aged 30)	1.87 m (6 ft 1 1/2 in)
6	F	Ary Chandra	(Indonesia) Pelita Jaya Esia	10 November 1984 (aged 26)	1.80 m (5 ft 11 in)
7	F	Amin Prihantono	(Indonesia) Satria Muda BritAma Jakarta	27 May 1982 (aged 29)	1.88 m (6 ft 2 in)
8	G	Dirk Gerungan	(Indonesia) Dell Aspac Jakarta	20 May 1987 (aged 24)	1.82 m (5 ft 11 1/2 in)
9	G	Dimas Dewanto	(Indonesia) Pelita Jaya Esia	2 May 1986 (aged 25)	1.80 m (5 ft 11 in)
10	G	Mario Wuysang	(Indonesia) Garuda Flexi Bandung	5 May 1979 (aged 32)	1.76 m (5 ft 9 1/2 in)
11	F	Dwi Haryoko	(Indonesia) Nuvo CLS Knights	1 February 1985 (aged 26)	1.93 m (6 ft 4 in)
12	C	Ponsianus Nyoman Indrawan	(Indonesia) Pelita Jaya Esia	13 August 1985 (aged 26)	1.90 m (6 ft 3 in)
13	C	Rony Gunawan	(Indonesia) Satria Muda BritAma Jakarta	20 August 1980 (aged 31)	1.94 m (6 ft 4 1/2 in)
14	F	Wellyanson Situmorang	(Indonesia) Satria Muda BritAma Jakarta	19 July 1982 (aged 29)	1.88 m (6 ft 2 in)
15	C	Christian Ronaldo Sitepu	(Indonesia) Satria Muda BritAma Jakarta	27 October 1986 (aged 24)	2.00 m (6 ft 6 1/2 in)

=== Japan ===
Head coach: (United States) Tom Wisman

#	Pos	Name	Club	Date of Birth	Height
4	G	Keijuro Matsui	(Japan) Toyota Alvark	16 October 1985 (aged 25)	1.88 m (6 ft 2 in)
5	G	Ken Takeda	(Japan) Link Tochigi Brex	5 October 1978 (aged 32)	1.88 m (6 ft 2 in)
6	G	Ryota Sakurai	(Japan) Levanga Hokkaido	13 March 1983 (aged 28)	1.94 m (6 ft 4 1/2 in)
7	G	Takumi Ishizaki	(Germany) BV Chemnitz 99	16 July 1984 (aged 27)	1.88 m (6 ft 2 in)
8	G	Shinsuke Kashiwagi	(Japan) Aisin Seahorses	22 December 1981 (aged 29)	1.83 m (6 ft 0 in)
9	F	Takuya Kawamura	(Japan) Link Tochigi Brex	24 April 1986 (aged 25)	1.93 m (6 ft 4 in)
10	F	Kosuke Takeuchi	(Japan) Toyota Alvark	29 January 1985 (aged 26)	2.05 m (6 ft 8 1/2 in)
11	F	Tomoo Amino	(Japan) Link Tochigi Brex	25 September 1980 (aged 30)	1.96 m (6 ft 5 in)
12	F	Kenta Hirose	(Japan) Panasonic Trians	11 July 1985 (aged 26)	1.93 m (6 ft 4 in)
13	G	Takeki Shonaka	(Japan) Toyota Alvark	15 September 1984 (aged 27)	1.80 m (5 ft 11 in)
14	C	Atsuya Ota	(Japan) Hamamatsu Phoenix	4 June 1984 (aged 27)	2.06 m (6 ft 9 in)
15	C	Joji Takeuchi	(Japan) Hitachi SunRockers	29 January 1985 (aged 26)	2.05 m (6 ft 8 1/2 in)

=== Jordan ===
Head coach: (United States) Tab Baldwin

#	Pos	Name	Club	Date of Birth	Height
4	C	Mohammad Shaher	(Jordan) Orthodox	3 March 1990 (aged 21)	2.05 m (6 ft 8 1/2 in)
5	G	Rasheim Wright	(Lebanon) Anibal Zahle	21 July 1981 (aged 30)	1.91 m (6 ft 3 in)
6	C	Ali Jamal Zaghab	(Jordan) Aramex	3 June 1988 (aged 23)	2.03 m (6 ft 8 in)
7	F	Abdalla Abuqoura	(Jordan) Applied Science University	30 May 1984 (aged 27)	2.02 m (6 ft 7 1/2 in)
8	F	Khaldoon Abu Ruqayah	(Jordan) Orthodox	1 April 1983 (aged 28)	2.03 m (6 ft 8 in)
9	G	Enver Soobzokov	(Jordan) Applied Science University	16 May 1978 (aged 33)	1.98 m (6 ft 6 in)
10	G	Sam Daghlas	(China) Shanxi Zhongyu	18 September 1979 (aged 31)	1.99 m (6 ft 6 1/2 in)
11	G	Wesam Al-Sous	(Jordan) Applied Science University	24 February 1983 (aged 28)	1.83 m (6 ft 0 in)
12	G	Mahmoud Abdeen	(Jordan) Orthodox	23 December 1987 (aged 23)	1.87 m (6 ft 1 1/2 in)
13	C	Zaid Al-Khas	(China) Qingdao DoubleStar	7 March 1976 (aged 35)	2.06 m (6 ft 9 in)
14	C	Islam Abbas	(Jordan) Applied Science University	11 March 1980 (aged 31)	2.00 m (6 ft 6 1/2 in)
15	F	Zaid Abbas	(China) Beijing Ducks	21 November 1983 (aged 27)	2.03 m (6 ft 8 in)

=== Syria ===
Head coach: (Serbia) Goran Miljević

#	Pos	Name	Club	Date of Birth	Height
4	G	Ioannis Deeb	(Syria) Al-Jalaa Aleppo	11 February 1986 (aged 25)	1.85 m (6 ft 1 in)
5	F	Shadi Lubus	(Syria) Al-Jaish	9 March 1986 (aged 25)	2.05 m (6 ft 8 1/2 in)
6	F	Wael Jlilati	(Syria) Al-Ittihad Aleppo	30 January 1990 (aged 21)	2.00 m (6 ft 6 1/2 in)
7	G	Nour Al-Samman	(Syria) Al-Jaish	16 September 1978 (aged 32)	1.90 m (6 ft 3 in)
8	G	Vatche Nalbandian	(Syria) Al-Jaish	25 May 1983 (aged 28)	1.80 m (5 ft 11 in)
9	G	Rami Al-Khatib	(Syria) Al-Jaish	1 January 1984 (aged 27)	1.90 m (6 ft 3 in)
10	F	Samir Al-Daks	(Syria) Al-Ittihad Aleppo	29 June 1984 (aged 27)	1.95 m (6 ft 5 in)
11	F	Mahmoud Osfira	(Syria) Al-Ittihad Aleppo	2 January 1991 (aged 20)	2.03 m (6 ft 8 in)
12	G	Joseph Abboud	(Syria) Al-Taliya	31 August 1989 (aged 22)	1.85 m (6 ft 1 in)
13	F	Eder Araujo	(Syria) Al-Jalaa Aleppo	4 May 1981 (aged 30)	2.12 m (6 ft 11 1/2 in)
14	C	Muhieddin Kasaballi	(Syria) Al-Jaish	18 May 1984 (aged 27)	2.08 m (6 ft 10 in)
15	C	Abdulwahab Al-Hamwi	(Syria) Al-Karamah	15 June 1990 (aged 21)	2.17 m (7 ft 1 1/2 in)

== Group D ==
=== Bahrain ===
Head coach: (United States) Erik Rashad

#	Pos	Name	Club	Date of Birth	Height
4	G	Mohamed Abdulmajeed	(Bahrain) Al-Muharraq	17 March 1986 (aged 25)	1.80 m (5 ft 11 in)
5	G	Husain Shaker Al-Tawash	(Bahrain) Al-Ahli	4 July 1986 (aged 25)	1.74 m (5 ft 8 1/2 in)
6	G	Maytham Jameel	(Bahrain) Al-Ahli	23 September 1990 (aged 20)	1.82 m (5 ft 11 1/2 in)
7	F	Bader Malabes	(Bahrain) Al-Muharraq	11 August 1987 (aged 24)	1.90 m (6 ft 3 in)
8		Mohamed Salman	(Bahrain) Al-Najma	29 January 1992 (aged 19)
9		Mohamed Nabeel	Al-Bahrain	9 August 1989 (aged 22)
10		Hesham Sarhan	(Bahrain) Al-Ahli	24 June 1992 (aged 19)
11		Ebrahim Al-Khabbaz	(Bahrain) Issa Town	16 February 1973 (aged 38)
12	C	Ahmed Najaf	(Bahrain) Al-Manama	28 September 1987 (aged 23)	2.02 m (6 ft 7 1/2 in)
13	C	Abdulrahman Ghali	(Bahrain) Al-Ahli	14 October 1988 (aged 22)	1.97 m (6 ft 5 1/2 in)
14		Mahdi Ashoor	(Bahrain) Al-Ahli	24 December 1990 (aged 20)
15	F	Ahmed Malallah	(Bahrain) Al-Muharraq	3 July 1971 (aged 40)	1.88 m (6 ft 2 in)

=== China ===
Head coach: (United States) Bob Donewald

#	Pos	Name	Club	Date of Birth	Height
4	F	Ding Jinhui	(China) Zhejiang Golden Bulls	27 October 1989 (aged 21)	2.04 m (6 ft 8 1/2 in)
5	G	Liu Wei	(China) Shanghai Sharks	15 January 1980 (aged 31)	1.91 m (6 ft 3 in)
6	F	Zhang Bo	(China) Bayi Rockets	30 September 1990 (aged 20)	1.98 m (6 ft 6 in)
7	F	Yi Li	(China) Jiangsu Dragons	7 November 1987 (aged 23)	2.02 m (6 ft 7 1/2 in)
8	F	Zhu Fangyu	(China) Guangdong Southern Tigers	5 January 1983 (aged 28)	2.01 m (6 ft 7 in)
9	G	Sun Yue	(China) Beijing Olympians	6 November 1985 (aged 25)	2.06 m (6 ft 9 in)
10	C	Zhang Zhaoxu	(China) Shanghai Sharks	18 November 1987 (aged 23)	2.21 m (7 ft 3 in)
11	F	Yi Jianlian	(United States) Washington Wizards	27 October 1987 (aged 23)	2.13 m (7 ft 0 in)
12	G	Yu Shulong	(China) Jilin Northeast Tigers	19 February 1990 (aged 21)	1.85 m (6 ft 1 in)
13	C	Su Wei	(China) Guangdong Southern Tigers	28 July 1989 (aged 22)	2.11 m (6 ft 11 in)
14	C	Wang Zhizhi	(China) Bayi Rockets	8 July 1977 (aged 34)	2.16 m (7 ft 1 in)
15	G	Shirelijan Muxtar	(China) Xinjiang Flying Tigers	4 January 1991 (aged 20)	1.91 m (6 ft 3 in)

=== Philippines ===
Head coach: (Serbia) Rajko Toroman

#	Pos	Name	Club	Date of Birth	Height
4	G	Mark Barroca	(Philippines) Smart Gilas	25 April 1986 (aged 25)	1.76 m (5 ft 9 1/2 in)
5	C	Asi Taulava	(Philippines) Meralco Bolts	2 March 1973 (aged 38)	2.06 m (6 ft 9 in)
6	G	JVee Casio	(Philippines) Smart Gilas	1 September 1986 (aged 25)	1.76 m (5 ft 9 1/2 in)
7	G	Jimmy Alapag	(Philippines) Talk 'N Text Tropang Texters	30 December 1977 (aged 33)	1.76 m (5 ft 9 1/2 in)
8	G	Chris Tiu	(Philippines) Smart Gilas	15 July 1985 (aged 26)	1.78 m (5 ft 10 in)
9	F	Japeth Aguilar	(Philippines) Smart Gilas	25 January 1987 (aged 24)	2.08 m (6 ft 10 in)
10	F	Mac Baracael	(Philippines) Smart Gilas	14 April 1985 (aged 26)	1.88 m (6 ft 2 in)
11	C	Marcus Douthit	(Philippines) Smart Gilas	15 April 1980 (aged 31)	2.11 m (6 ft 11 in)
12	F	Kelly Williams	(Philippines) Talk 'N Text Tropang Texters	7 February 1982 (aged 29)	2.03 m (6 ft 8 in)
13	G	Marcio Lassiter	(Philippines) Smart Gilas	16 May 1987 (aged 24)	1.88 m (6 ft 2 in)
14	F	Chris Lutz	(Philippines) Smart Gilas	11 February 1985 (aged 26)	1.90 m (6 ft 3 in)
15	F	Ranidel de Ocampo	(Philippines) Talk 'N Text Tropang Texters	8 December 1981 (aged 29)	1.98 m (6 ft 6 in)

=== United Arab Emirates ===
Head coach: (Bosnia and Herzegovina) Zoran Zupčević

#	Pos	Name	Club	Date of Birth	Height
4	G	Jasim Abdulredha	(United Arab Emirates) Al-Shabab	22 March 1981 (aged 30)	1.83 m (6 ft 0 in)
5	F	Mohamed Al-Braiki	(United Arab Emirates) Al-Ahli	21 December 1991 (aged 19)	1.87 m (6 ft 1 1/2 in)
6	G	Ibrahim Khalfan	(United Arab Emirates) Al-Wasl	9 June 1979 (aged 32)	1.80 m (5 ft 11 in)
7	G	Ibrahim Al-Sari	(United Arab Emirates) Al-Nasr	4 July 1980 (aged 31)	1.80 m (5 ft 11 in)
8	G	Hussain Ali	(United Arab Emirates) Al-Shabab	6 June 1989 (aged 22)	1.80 m (5 ft 11 in)
9	G	Khalifa Khalil	(United Arab Emirates) Al-Ahli	25 August 1991 (aged 20)	1.76 m (5 ft 9 1/2 in)
10	F	Rashed Mohamed	(United Arab Emirates) Al-Sharjah	3 April 1990 (aged 21)	1.89 m (6 ft 2 1/2 in)
11	G	Rashed Al-Zaabi	(United Arab Emirates) Al-Wasl	19 October 1988 (aged 22)	1.86 m (6 ft 1 in)
12	F	Qais Omar Al-Shabebi	(United Arab Emirates) Al-Ahli	31 October 1991 (aged 19)	1.92 m (6 ft 3 1/2 in)
13	F	Malalla Rashed	(United Arab Emirates) Al-Sharjah	18 June 1983 (aged 28)	1.95 m (6 ft 5 in)
14	C	Ali Al-Hattawi	(United Arab Emirates) Al-Shabab	20 November 1979 (aged 31)	2.02 m (6 ft 7 1/2 in)
15	C	Jasim Mohamed	(United Arab Emirates) Al-Sharjah	24 November 1988 (aged 22)	2.05 m (6 ft 8 1/2 in)
