= 2011 FIBA Asia Championship =

Basketball championship

2011年亞洲籃球錦標賽

Tournament details
- Host country: China
- City: Wuhan
- Dates: 15–25 September
- Teams: 16
- Venues: 2 (in 1 host city)

Final positions
- Champions: China (15th title)
- Runners-up: Jordan
- Third place: South Korea
- Fourth place: Philippines

Tournament statistics
- MVP: (China) Yi Jianlian
- Top scorer: (Philippines) Marcus Douthit (21.9 points per game)

The 2011 FIBA Asia Championship for Men is the intercontinental championship for basketball organized by FIBA Asia that doubles as a qualifying tournament for the men's basketball tournament of the 2012 Summer Olympics in London, England, United Kingdom. The tournament was held from 15 to 25 September 2011 in Wuhan, Hubei, China. Lebanon was the original host for the event. Team China won the tournament, defeating Jordan 70–69 in the final. It was the first time in the history of the FIBA Asia Cup that the title was won by just one point.

== Qualification ==
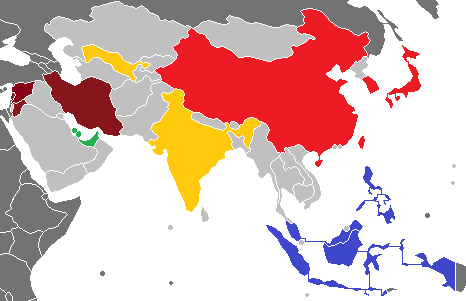
Qualified teams

According to the FIBA Asia rules, each zone had two berths, and the host nation, China and the FIBA Asia Stanković Cup champions, Lebanon, were automatically qualified. According to performance in the 2010 FIBA Asia Stanković Cup, the other four places are allocated to the zones. Therefore, with Lebanon, Japan, Qatar and the Philippines finishing in the top four in that tournament, West Asia, East Asia, the Gulf and Southeast Asia were all given one additional qualifying berth per zone.

East Asia (1+2+1)	Gulf (2+1)	Middle Asia (2)	Southeast Asia (2+1)	West Asia (1+2+1)
China	Qatar	India	Philippines	Lebanon
South Korea	United Arab Emirates	Uzbekistan	Indonesia	Iran
Japan	Bahrain		Malaysia	Jordan
Chinese Taipei				Syria

Among the 2009 qualified teams, Sri Lanka did not qualify for the tournament, while Kazakhstan and Kuwait did not participate. The three returning teams are Bahrain, which qualified in 2009 but withdrew, Syria, which did not participate in 2009, and Malaysia, which last participated in 2005.

== Draw ==
Location of Wuhan, China

The draw was held on July 6 at Wuhan. The four semifinalists of last year's 2010 FIBA Asia Stanković Cup were seeded into four different groups, and the draw decided which group each would figure in. Then, one Middle Asia was drawn into Group A, the other Middle Asia into B, Indonesia and the United Arab Emirates into C and D. The next four were Malaysia, Chinese Taipei, Syria and Bahrain in order. Finally, host China chose Group D, after which Iran, Jordan and Korea were drawn into Groups B, C, and A, respectively.

The following is the distribution of the pots before the draw, with teams sorted by their FIBA World Ranking (Bahrain is unranked); teams from each pot cannot be drawn together.

Pot 1	Pot 2	Pot 3	Pot 4
Lebanon (24); Qatar (29); Japan (33); Philippines (53)	Middle Asia – SAARC*; Middle Asia – Stans*; Indonesia (63); United Arab Emirates (67)	Chinese Taipei (41); Syria (58); Malaysia (70); Bahrain (NR)	China (10); Iran (20); South Korea (31); Jordan (32)

- The draw was conducted before the qualifiers from Middle Asia were known. India (ranked 50th) won the qualifiers from the SAARC, while Uzbekistan (ranked 58th) was the qualifier from the "Stans" countries.

== Venues ==
Location of the arenas in Hubei, China.

Two arenas in Wuhan, Wuhan Sports Center Gymnasium and Hongshan Gymnasium, were used in the championship. Wuhan Sports Center Gymnasium was the primary venue.

== Squads ==
Each team has a roster of twelve players. Only one naturalized player per team is allowed by FIBA.

== Preliminary round ==
=== Group A ===
Team	Pld	W	L	PF	PA	PD	Pts
South Korea	3	3	0	253	157	+96	6
Lebanon	3	2	1	220	207	+13	5
Malaysia	3	1	2	172	243	−71	4
India	3	0	3	188	226	−38	3

September 15
15:30

Report

Malaysia	42–89	South Korea
Scoring by quarter: 3–29, 19–18, 8–29, 12–13
Pts: Kwaan Y.J. 9 Rebs: Kwaan Y.J. 9 Asts: Guganeswaran 5		Pts: Cho S.M. 16; Rebs: Kim J.S., Oh S.K. 7 Asts: Kim J.S. 9

Wuhan Sports Center Gymnasium, Wuhan
Referees: Heros Avanesian (IRI), Qiao Longsheng (CHN), Mohammad Al-Fakhouri (SYR)

September 15
20:00

Report

Lebanon	71–68	India
Scoring by quarter: 20–16, 20–11, 14–32, 17–9
Pts: Abdelnour 24; Rebs: Hoskin 9 Asts: Seven players 2		Pts: Koroth 20; Rebs: Ap. Singh 7 Asts: T. Singh 4

Hongshan Gymnasium, Wuhan
Referees: Yuji Hirahara (JPN), Chung Yi-chih (TPE), Amir Hossein Safarzadeh (IRI)

September 16
15:30

Report

Lebanon	62–80	South Korea
Scoring by quarter: 16–17, 13–16, 15–20, 18–27
Pts: Rida 20; Rebs: Hoskin 9 Asts: Akl 3		Pts: Yang D.G. 20; Rebs: Kim J.S. 10; Asts: Yang D.G. 7

Wuhan Sports Center Gymnasium, Wuhan
Referees: Scott Butler (AUS), Heros Avanesian (IRI), Wang Mei (CHN)

September 16
18:00

Report

India	67–71	Malaysia
Scoring by quarter: 13–15, 13–27, 24–12, 17–17
Pts: J. Singh 25; Rebs: Am. Singh 12; Asts: T. Singh, J. Singh 3		Pts: Ooi B.S. 20; Rebs: Guganeswaran 7 Asts: Guganeswaran 6

Hongshan Gymnasium, Wuhan
Referees: Nobuyasu Aibara (JPN), Yasser Abbas (QAT), Yang Maogong (CHN)

September 17
13:30

Report

South Korea	84–53	India
Scoring by quarter: 27–11, 19–17, 20–6, 18–19
Pts: Kang B.H. 22; Rebs: Oh S.K. 11; Asts: Cho S.M. 5		Pts: Rai 11; Rebs: Am. Singh 9 Asts: Bhriguvanshi, T. Singh, Y. Singh 2

Wuhan Sports Center Gymnasium, Wuhan
Referees: Cristiano Maranho (BRA), Reynaldo Yante (PHI), Hussain Al-Bloushi (UAE)

September 17
20:00

Report

Malaysia	59–87	Lebanon
Scoring by quarter: 8–27, 19–16, 13–24, 19–20
Pts: Kwaan Y.J. 13; Rebs: Chee L.W. 7 Asts: Guganeswaran 4		Pts: Stephan 24; Rebs: Tabet 16; Asts: Ibrahim 11

Hongshan Gymnasium, Wuhan
Referees: Wang Mei (CHN), Heros Avanesian (IRI), Dwi Cahyo Kartiko (INA)

=== Group B ===
Team	Pld	W	L	PF	PA	PD	Pts
Iran	3	3	0	221	79	+142	6
Chinese Taipei	3	2	1	212	198	+14	5
Uzbekistan	3	1	2	136	225	−89	4
Qatar	3	0	3	94	161	−67	3

September 15
11:00

Report

Chinese Taipei	37–49	Iran
Scoring by quarter: 8–10, 11–7, 12–15, 6–17
Pts: Wu T.H. 15; Rebs: Wu T.H. 7 Asts: Lee H.L. 4		Pts: Nikkhah 18; Rebs: Haddadi 18; Asts: Davoudi, Kamrani, Haddadi 3

Wuhan Sports Center Gymnasium, Wuhan
Referees: Naser Abu Rashed (JOR), Dennis Barbacena (PHI), Rajnarayan Patro (IND)

September 15
18:00

Report

Qatar	12–27	Uzbekistan
Scoring by quarter: 12–27
Pts: Abdulrahman 8 Rebs: Abdulrahman 3 Asts: 0		Pts: Shatrov 10; Rebs: Juginisov 2 Asts: Juginisov 1

Hongshan Gymnasium, Wuhan
Referees: Marwan Egho (LIB), Yun Jong-Hyun (KOR), Yunes Janahi (BRN)

September 16
11:00

Report

Uzbekistan	71–81	Chinese Taipei
Scoring by quarter: 14–24, 22–21, 14–22, 21–14
Pts: Zinovev 17; Rebs: Juginisov 6 Asts: Juginisov 4		Pts: Chang T.H. 15; Rebs: Tseng W.T., Wu T.H., Ho S.C. 5 Asts: Tseng W.T. 5

Wuhan Sports Center Gymnasium, Wuhan
Referees: Yasser Hanoneh (SYR), Hussain Al-Bloushi (UAE), Yun Jong-Hyun (KOR)

September 16
18:00

Report

Qatar	4–40	Iran
Scoring by quarter: 4–40
Pts: Matalkeh 3 Rebs: Abdelqader 3 Asts: 0		Pts: Afagh 10; Rebs: Kazemi, Kardoust 4 Asts: Davarpanah, Kazemi 3

Wuhan Sports Center Gymnasium, Wuhan
Referees: Qiao Longsheng (CHN), Yuji Hirahara (JPN), Reynaldo Yante (PHI)

September 17
15:30

Report

Chinese Taipei	94–78	Qatar
Scoring by quarter: 23–15, 27–25, 18–21, 26–17
Pts: Chang T.H. 35; Rebs: Tseng W.T. 7 Asts: Lee H.L. 7		Pts: Abdelqader 30; Rebs: Saeed 13; Asts: Saeed 4

Wuhan Sports Center Gymnasium, Wuhan
Referees: Ng Cheng Hou (MAS), Rajnarayan Patro (IND), Dennis Barbacena (PHI)

September 17
18:00

Report

Iran	132–38	Uzbekistan
Scoring by quarter: 38–14, 41–11, 28–9, 25–4
Pts: Kazemi, Haddadi 18; Rebs: Kazemi 14; Asts: Haddadi 6		Pts: Kozlov 12; Rebs: Yahin 10; Asts: Denisov 4

Wuhan Sports Center Gymnasium, Wuhan
Referees: Nobuyasu Aibara (JPN), Yang Maogong (CHN), Marwan Egho (LIB)

- Qatar lost the game against Uzbekistan by default after being left with only one eligible player. Uzbekistan were ahead 27–12 with 4:02 left in the first quarter when the game was called off.
- Qatar lost the game against Iran by default after being left with only one eligible player. Iran were ahead 40–4 with 2:18 left in the first quarter when the game was called off.

=== Group C ===
Team	Pld	W	L	PF	PA	PD	Pts
Japan	3	3	0	250	201	+49	6
Jordan	3	2	1	247	209	+38	5
Syria	3	1	2	187	209	−22	4
Indonesia	3	0	3	179	244	−65	3

September 15
9:00

Report

Syria	58–71	Jordan
Scoring by quarter: 12–18, 24–13, 10–25, 12–15
Pts: Jlilati 13; Rebs: Al-Daks 8 Asts: Deeb 4		Pts: Wright 20; Rebs: Z. Abbas 9 Asts: Daghlas 6

Wuhan Sports Center Gymnasium, Wuhan
Referees: Yang Maogong (CHN), Yasser Abbas (QAT), Tan Chin Siong (MAS)

September 15
13:30

Report

Japan	81–59	Indonesia
Scoring by quarter: 15–8, 22–16, 24–15, 20–20
Pts: J. Takeuchi 11; Rebs: K. Takeuchi 12; Asts: Kawamura 4		Pts: Sitepu 14; Rebs: Gunawan, Sitepu 6 Asts: Wuysang 5

Wuhan Sports Center Gymnasium, Wuhan
Referees: Amarjot Singh Mavi (IND), Rabah Noujaim (LIB), Wang Mei (CHN)

September 16
9:00

Report

Indonesia	61–74	Syria
Scoring by quarter: 13–17, 20–17, 12–20, 16–20
Pts: Wuysang, Gunawan 11; Rebs: Indrawan 9 Asts: Wuysang 4		Pts: Araujo 24; Rebs: Araujo 11; Asts: Deeb 9

Wuhan Sports Center Gymnasium, Wuhan
Referees: Shin Gi-Rok (KOR), Amir Hossein Safarzadeh (IRI), Batir Miradilov (UZB)

September 16
13:30

Report

Jordan	87–92	Japan
Scoring by quarter: 17–19, 12–17, 17–28, 41–28
Pts: Wright 30; Rebs: Zaghab 9 Asts: Daghlas, I. Abbas 4		Pts: Kawamura 23; Rebs: J. Takeuchi 19; Asts: Kawamura 3

Wuhan Sports Center Gymnasium, Wuhan
Referees: Marwan Egho (LIB), Yunes Janahi (BRN), Chung Yi-chih (TPE)

September 17
9:00

Report

Syria	55–77	Japan
Scoring by quarter: 15–17, 9–17, 18–23, 13–20
Pts: Deeb 15; Rebs: Lubus 13; Asts: Deeb, Araujo 2		Pts: Kawamura 17; Rebs: K. Takeuchi 11; Asts: Shonaka 5

Wuhan Sports Center Gymnasium, Wuhan
Referees: Yunes Janahi (BRN), Hsieh Wen-wei (TPE), Yasser Abbas (QAT)

September 17
18:00

Report

Jordan	89–59	Indonesia
Scoring by quarter: 22–16, 22–13, 21–15, 24–15
Pts: Wright 18; Rebs: I. Abbas 10; Asts: Abuqoura, Soobzokov, Al-Sous 4		Pts: Sitepu 15; Rebs: Sitepu 6 Asts: Wuysang 5

Hongshan Gymnasium, Wuhan
Referees: Amarjot Singh Mavi (IND), Wang Mei (CHN), Shin Gi-Rok (KOR)

=== Group D ===
Team	Pld	W	L	PF	PA	PD	Pts
China	3	3	0	251	169	+82	6
Philippines	3	2	1	265	198	+67	5
United Arab Emirates	3	1	2	203	220	−17	4
Bahrain	3	0	3	173	305	−132	3

September 15
18:00

Report

Philippines	92–52	United Arab Emirates
Scoring by quarter: 17–12, 24–10, 28–13, 23–17
Pts: Baracael 15; Rebs: Taulava 11; Asts: Barroca 5		Pts: Ali 12; Rebs: J. Mohamed 10; Asts: Khalfan, Khalil 3

Wuhan Sports Center Gymnasium, Wuhan
Referees: Scott Butler (AUS), Yasser Hanoneh (SYR), Hsieh Wen-wei (TPE)

September 15
20:00

Report

Bahrain	49–101	China
Scoring by quarter: 20–25, 4–26, 21–26, 4–24
Pts: Malabes 17; Rebs: Malabes, Najaf, Ghali 4 Asts: Al-Tawash 3		Pts: Liu W., Yi J.L. 15; Rebs: Zhang Z.X. 15; Asts: Wang Z.Z. 4

Wuhan Sports Center Gymnasium, Wuhan
Referees: Cristiano Maranho (BRA), Ng Cheng Hou (MAS), Dwi Cahyo Kartiko (INA)

September 16
20:00

Report

Philippines	60–75	China
Scoring by quarter: 13–22, 8–21, 19–12, 20–20
Pts: Douthit 17; Rebs: Douthit 10; Asts: Williams 4		Pts: Yi J.L. 20; Rebs: Yi J.L. 17; Asts: Liu W. 7

Wuhan Sports Center Gymnasium, Wuhan
Referees: Cristiano Maranho (BRA), Naser Abu Rashed (JOR), Amarjot Singh Mavi (IND)

September 16
20:00

Report

United Arab Emirates	91–53	Bahrain
Scoring by quarter: 16–17, 21–10, 33–19, 21–7
Pts: Khalfan 17; Rebs: Rashed, Al-Hattawi 10; Asts: Khalfan, Al-Zaabi 4		Pts: Jameel 15; Rebs: Malallah 6 Asts: Abdulmajeed, Malabes 4

Hongshan Gymnasium, Wuhan
Referees: Rabah Noujaim (LIB), Dwi Cahyo Kartiko (INA), Ng Cheng Hou (MAS)

September 17
11:00

Report

Bahrain	71–113	Philippines
Scoring by quarter: 18–30, 22–21, 7–35, 24–27
Pts: Malabes 15; Rebs: Five players 2 Asts: Malabes 7		Pts: Aguilar 21; Rebs: Aguilar 12; Asts: Barroca 7

Wuhan Sports Center Gymnasium, Wuhan
Referees: Chung Yi-chih (TPE), Naser Abu Rashed (JOR), Yun Jong-Hyun (KOR)

September 17
20:00

Report

China	75–60	United Arab Emirates
Scoring by quarter: 22–8, 18–24, 21–10, 14–18
Pts: Zhang B. 15; Rebs: Zhang Z.X. 13; Asts: Yu S.L. 3		Pts: Al-Zaabi 21; Rebs: Al-Zaabi, J. Mohamed 6 Asts: Al-Zaabi 3

Wuhan Sports Center Gymnasium, Wuhan
Referees: Scott Butler (AUS), Tan Chin Siong (MAS), Mohammad Al-Fakhouri (SYR)

== Second round ==
- The results and the points of the matches between the same teams that were already played during the preliminary round shall be taken into account for the second round.

=== Group E ===
Team	Pld	W	L	PF	PA	PD	Pts
Iran	5	5	0	457	218	+239	10
South Korea	5	4	1	419	301	+118	9
Chinese Taipei	5	3	2	348	322	+26	8
Lebanon	5	2	3	353	328	+25	7
Malaysia	5	1	4	279	481	−202	6
Uzbekistan	5	0	5	294	500	−206	5

September 19
9:00

Report

Malaysia	36–121	Iran
Scoring by quarter: 14–34, 9–22, 5–35, 8–30
Pts: Guganeswaran 13; Rebs: Chee L.W. 5 Asts: Ooi B.S. 2		Pts: Afagh, Haddadi 20; Rebs: Sahakian 15; Asts: Kamrani 8

Wuhan Sports Center Gymnasium, Wuhan
Referees: Yuji Hirahara (JPN), Wang Mei (CHN), Dennis Barbacena (PHI)

September 19
11:00

Report

Lebanon	58–60	Chinese Taipei
Scoring by quarter: 13–16, 17–14, 20–20, 8–10
Pts: Hoskin 19; Rebs: Hoskin 11; Asts: Akl 6		Pts: Chen H.A. 15; Rebs: Wu T.H. 9 Asts: Tseng W.T. 8

Wuhan Sports Center Gymnasium, Wuhan
Referees: Cristiano Maranho (BRA), Hussain Al-Bloushi (UAE), Nobuyasu Aibara (JPN)

September 19
13:30

Report

South Korea	106–57	Uzbekistan
Scoring by quarter: 30–11, 22–13, 22–13, 32–20
Pts: Moon T.J. 21; Rebs: Oh S.K. 9 Asts: Park C.H. 8		Pts: Shatrov 11; Rebs: Yahin 6 Asts: Zinovev 3

Wuhan Sports Center Gymnasium, Wuhan
Referees: Naser Abu Rashed (JOR), Dwi Cahyo Kartiko (INA), Qiao Longsheng (CHN)

September 20
9:00

Report

Uzbekistan	75–80	Malaysia
Scoring by quarter: 10–21, 23–23, 21–17, 21–19
Pts: Kozlov 21; Rebs: Kozlov 8 Asts: Shatrov 7		Pts: Guganeswaran 14; Rebs: Chee L.W. 9 Asts: Guganeswaran 6

Wuhan Sports Center Gymnasium, Wuhan
Referees: Qiao Longsheng (CHN), Yasser Hanoneh (SYR), Reynaldo Yante (PHI)

September 20
13:30

Report

Iran	76–45	Lebanon
Scoring by quarter: 18–7, 14–12, 17–5, 27–21
Pts: Afagh, Nikkhah 16; Rebs: Haddadi 12; Asts: Haddadi 5		Pts: Rida 16; Rebs: Hoskin 11; Asts: Akl 5

Wuhan Sports Center Gymnasium, Wuhan
Referees: Scott Butler (AUS), Wang Mei (CHN), Nobuyasu Aibara (JPN)

September 20
15:30

Report

Chinese Taipei	61–82	South Korea
Scoring by quarter: 20–18, 12–25, 8–21, 21–18
Pts: Wu T.H. 15; Rebs: Tseng W.T., Chang T.H. 6 Asts: Chen H.A. 3		Pts: Cho S.M. 19; Rebs: Four players 7 Asts: Kim J.S. 8

Wuhan Sports Center Gymnasium, Wuhan
Referees: Cristiano Maranho (BRA), Yuji Hirahara (JPN), Yang Maogong (CHN)

September 21
9:00

Report

Lebanon	101–53	Uzbekistan
Scoring by quarter: 24–22, 26–4, 25–9, 26–18
Pts: Rida, Hoskin 18; Rebs: Tabet 17; Asts: Martinez, Akl 5		Pts: Denisov 19; Rebs: Timofeev 7 Asts: Shatrov, Pereverzev, Timofeev 2

Wuhan Sports Center Gymnasium, Wuhan
Referees: Yang Maogong (CHN), Mohammad Al-Fakhouri (SYR), Reynaldo Yante (PHI)

September 21
11:00

Report

Malaysia	62–109	Chinese Taipei
Scoring by quarter: 18–24, 18–27, 11–30, 15–28
Pts: Guganeswaran 15; Rebs: Kwaan Y.J. 8 Asts: Lau B.I., Guganeswaran 4		Pts: Chang T.H. 25; Rebs: Ho S.C. 8 Asts: Su I.C. 9

Wuhan Sports Center Gymnasium, Wuhan
Referees: Yunes Janahi (BRN), Wang Mei (CHN), Hussain Al-Bloushi (UAE)

September 21
15:30

Report

South Korea	62–79	Iran
Scoring by quarter: 13–23, 17–19, 21–19, 11–18
Pts: Lee J.S., Yang D.G. 14; Rebs: Moon T.J. 16; Asts: Kim J.S. 4		Pts: Haddadi 17; Rebs: Haddadi 11; Asts: Kamrani 5

Wuhan Sports Center Gymnasium, Wuhan
Referees: Scott Butler (AUS), Amarjot Singh Mavi (IND), Naser Abu Rashed (JOR)

=== Group F ===
Team	Pld	W	L	PF	PA	PD	Pts
China	5	5	0	417	309	+108	10
Philippines	5	4	1	382	319	+63	9
Japan	5	3	2	404	370	+34	8
Jordan	5	2	3	376	395	−19	7
Syria	5	1	4	316	386	−70	6
United Arab Emirates	5	0	5	326	442	−116	5

September 19
15:30

Report

Jordan	64–72	Philippines
Scoring by quarter: 20–11, 11–15, 16–21, 17–25
Pts: Daghlas 18; Rebs: Z. Abbas 12; Asts: Daghlas, I. Abbas 2		Pts: Douthit 19; Rebs: Douthit 15; Asts: Tiu 4

Wuhan Sports Center Gymnasium, Wuhan
Referees: Scott Butler (AUS), Marwan Egho (LIB), Ng Cheng Hou (MAS)

September 19
18:00

Report

Japan	101–61	United Arab Emirates
Scoring by quarter: 15–9, 41–17, 24–17, 21–18
Pts: Amino 17; Rebs: K. Takeuchi 10; Asts: Shonaka 5		Pts: Khalil 14; Rebs: Al-Braiki, Rashed 5 Asts: Khalil 3

Wuhan Sports Center Gymnasium, Wuhan
Referees: Amir Hossein Safarzadeh (IRI), Hsieh Wen-wei (TPE), Shin Gi-Rok (KOR)

September 19
20:00

Report

Syria	71–90	China
Scoring by quarter: 10–24, 18–23, 21–23, 22–20
Pts: Deeb 16; Rebs: Al-Hamwi 12; Asts: Lubus 3		Pts: Yi J.L. 19; Rebs: Yi J.L. 6 Asts: Liu W., Sun Y. 4

Wuhan Sports Center Gymnasium, Wuhan
Referees: Heros Avanesian (IRI), Rajnarayan Patro (IND), Rabah Noujaim (LIB)

September 20
11:00

Report

United Arab Emirates	73–80	Syria
Scoring by quarter: 16–30, 19–18, 16–16, 22–16
Pts: Khalfan 25; Rebs: Al-Sari 8 Asts: Khalfan 2		Pts: Araujo 17; Rebs: Araujo 15; Asts: Araujo 4

Wuhan Sports Center Gymnasium, Wuhan
Referees: Chung Yi-chih (TPE), Shin Gi-Rok (KOR), Tan Chin Siong (MAS)

September 20
18:00

Report

Philippines	83–76	Japan
Scoring by quarter: 18–23, 16–17, 26–12, 23–24
Pts: Douthit 25; Rebs: Douthit 18; Asts: Alapag 4		Pts: J. Takeuchi 22; Rebs: K. Takeuchi, J. Takeuchi 8 Asts: Shonaka 4

Wuhan Sports Center Gymnasium, Wuhan
Referees: Rabah Noujaim (LIB), Amarjot Singh Mavi (IND), Amir Hossein Safarzadeh (IRI)

September 20
20:00

Report

China	93–60	Jordan
Scoring by quarter: 25–15, 15–19, 31–10, 22–16
Pts: Yi J.L. 16; Rebs: Yi J.L. 12; Asts: Sun Y. 3		Pts: Z. Abbas 17; Rebs: Soobzokov 9 Asts: Daghlas 3

Wuhan Sports Center Gymnasium, Wuhan
Referees: Marwan Egho (LIB), Yasser Abbas (QAT), Yun Jong-Hyun (KOR)

September 21
13:30

Report

Jordan	94–80	United Arab Emirates
Scoring by quarter: 40–20, 17–18, 25–20, 12–22
Pts: Daghlas 20; Rebs: Zaghab 9 Asts: Daghlas 9		Pts: Khalfan 28; Rebs: Khalfan 5 Asts: Khalfan, Khalil 4

Wuhan Sports Center Gymnasium, Wuhan
Referees: Batir Miradilov (UZB), Ng Cheng Hou (MAS), Shin Gi-Rok (KOR)

September 21
18:00

Report

Syria	52–75	Philippines
Scoring by quarter: 11–14, 21–9, 13–26, 7–26
Pts: Al-Hamwi 11; Rebs: Araujo 8 Asts: Deeb, Nalbandian 3		Pts: Douthit 20; Rebs: Taulava 9 Asts: Casio 4

Wuhan Sports Center Gymnasium, Wuhan
Referees: Chung Yi-chih (TPE), Yun Jong-Hyun (KOR), Rajnarayan Patro (IND)

September 21
20:00

Report

Japan	58–84	China
Scoring by quarter: 16–21, 14–23, 16–17, 12–23
Pts: Kawamura 24; Rebs: K. Takeuchi 7 Asts: Shonaka 4		Pts: Yi L. 19; Rebs: Yi J.L. 13; Asts: Liu W., Zhu F.Y. 5

Wuhan Sports Center Gymnasium, Wuhan
Referees: Cristiano Maranho (BRA), Heros Avanesian (IRI), Yasser Abbas (QAT)

== Classification 13th–16th ==
Semifinals
September 19
Indonesia	85
Bahrain	62
September 19
India	20
Qatar	0

13th place
September 20
Indonesia	84
India	75
15th place
September 20
Bahrain	20
Qatar	0

=== Semifinals ===
September 19
18:00

Report

Indonesia	85–62	Bahrain
Scoring by quarter: 12–17, 24–17, 17–11, 32–17
Pts: Poedjakesuma 32; Rebs: Indrawan 14; Asts: Wuysang 11		Pts: Malabes 17; Rebs: Ghali 8 Asts: Abdulmajeed, Jameel, Malabes 4

Hongshan Gymnasium, Wuhan
Referees: Tan Chin Siong (MAS), Batir Miradilov (UZB), Yasser Hanoneh (SYR)

September 19
20:00

India	20–0	Qatar
Forfeit

Hongshan Gymnasium, Wuhan

=== 15th place ===
September 20
20:00

Bahrain	20–0	Qatar
Forfeit

Hongshan Gymnasium, Wuhan

=== 13th place ===
September 20
18:00

Report

Indonesia	84–75	India
Scoring by quarter: 20–14, 24–23, 23–20, 17–18
Pts: Wuysang 17; Rebs: Indrawan 9 Asts: Wuysang 7		Pts: Koroth 22; Rebs: Am. Singh, J. Singh 6 Asts: J. Singh 6

Hongshan Gymnasium, Wuhan
Referees: Hsieh Wen-wei (TPE), Yunes Jahani (BRN), Wang Mei (CHN)

== Classification 9th–12th ==
Semifinals
September 23
Malaysia	87
United Arab Emirates	89
September 23
Uzbekistan	65
Syria	97

9th place
September 24
United Arab Emirates	72
Syria	76
11th place
September 24
Malaysia	82
Uzbekistan	76

=== Semifinals ===
September 23
9:00

Report

Malaysia	87–89	United Arab Emirates
Scoring by quarter: 23–24, 15–13, 21–27, 28–25
Pts: Chee L.W. 18; Rebs: Chee L.W. 19; Asts: Guganeswaran 7		Pts: Al-Zaabi 21; Rebs: Rashed 11; Asts: Khalfan, Ali, Al-Zaabi 4

Wuhan Sports Center Gymnasium, Wuhan
Referees: Nobuyasu Aibara (JPN), Qiao Longsheng (CHN), Mohammad Al-Fakhouri (SYR)

September 23
11:00

Report

Uzbekistan	65–97	Syria
Scoring by quarter: 11–21, 21–25, 15–24, 18–27
Pts: Kozlov 14; Rebs: Nuraliev, Zinovev 6 Asts: Juginisov, Zinovev 4		Pts: Abboud 13; Rebs: Araujo 12; Asts: Deeb 6

Wuhan Sports Center Gymnasium, Wuhan
Referees: Yuji Hirahara (JPN), Dennis Barbacena (PHI), Hsieh Wen-wei (TPE)

=== 11th place ===
September 24
9:00

Report

Malaysia	82–76	Uzbekistan
Scoring by quarter: 22–14, 23–19, 19–26, 18–17
Pts: Loh S.F. 18; Rebs: Chee L.W. 14; Asts: Guganeswaran 6		Pts: Denisov 21; Rebs: Kozlov 15; Asts: Kozlov 4

Wuhan Sports Center Gymnasium, Wuhan
Referees: Yun Jong-Hyun (KOR), Wang Mei (CHN), Yasser Abbas (QAT)

=== 9th place ===
September 24
11:00

Report

United Arab Emirates	72–76	Syria
Scoring by quarter: 24–21, 15–22, 14–16, 19–17
Pts: Ali 19; Rebs: Al-Braiki 10; Asts: Al-Braiki, Ali 3		Pts: Osfira 18; Rebs: Araujo 11; Asts: Nalbandian 7

Wuhan Sports Center Gymnasium, Wuhan
Referees: Wang Xiaochun (CHN), Reynaldo Yante (PHI), Batir Miradilov (UZB)

== Final round ==
Quarterfinals
September 23
Jordan	88
Iran	84
September 23
Philippines	95
Chinese Taipei	78
September 23
South Korea	86
Japan	67
September 23
Lebanon	48
China	68

Semifinals
September 24
Jordan	75
Philippines	61
September 24
South Korea	43
China	56

Final
September 25
Jordan	69
China	70
3rd place
September 25
Philippines	68
South Korea	70

Semifinals
September 24
Iran	98
Chinese Taipei	66
September 24
Japan	78
Lebanon	80

5th place
September 25
Iran	87
Lebanon	65
7th place
September 25
Chinese Taipei	72
Japan	81

=== Quarterfinals ===
September 23
13:30

Report

Jordan	88–84	Iran
Scoring by quarter: 20–19, 15–17, 22–26, 31–22
Pts: Daghlas 23; Rebs: Z. Abbas 7 Asts: Wright 6		Pts: Haddadi 27; Rebs: Kazemi 16; Asts: Haddadi 7

Wuhan Sports Center Gymnasium, Wuhan
Referees: Rabah Noujaim (LIB), Ng Cheng Hou (MAS), Hussain Al-Bloushi (UAE)

September 23
15:30

Report

South Korea	86–67	Japan
Scoring by quarter: 23–11, 22–15, 20–26, 21–15
Pts: Moon T.J. 17; Rebs: Ha S.J. 8 Asts: Kim J.S. 8		Pts: K. Takeuchi 16; Rebs: K. Takeuchi 13; Asts: Kawamura 6

Wuhan Sports Center Gymnasium, Wuhan
Referees: Cristiano Maranho (BRA), Yasser Hanoneh (SYR), Tan Chin Siong (MAS)

September 23
18:00

Report

Philippines	95–78	Chinese Taipei
Scoring by quarter: 19–23, 26–19, 25–15, 25–21
Pts: Douthit 37; Rebs: Douthit 10; Asts: Casio 4		Pts: Tseng W.T. 20; Rebs: Wu T.H., Lin C.C. 7 Asts: Lin C.C. 5

Wuhan Sports Center Gymnasium, Wuhan
Referees: Marwan Egho (LIB), Naser Abu Rashed (JOR), Yasser Abbas (QAT)

September 23
20:00

Report

Lebanon	48–68	China
Scoring by quarter: 12–14, 10–14, 10–23, 16–17
Pts: Hoskin 20; Rebs: Hoskin 10; Asts: Stephan, Kanaan 2		Pts: Liu W. 13; Rebs: Yi J.L. 9 Asts: Sun Y., Wang Z.Z. 2

Wuhan Sports Center Gymnasium, Wuhan
Referees: Heros Avanesian (IRI), Yunes Janahi (BRN), Amarjot Singh Mavi (IND)

=== Semifinals 5th–8th ===
September 24
13:30

Report

Iran	98–66	Chinese Taipei
Scoring by quarter: 21–16, 27–15, 27–19, 23–16
Pts: Haddadi 21; Rebs: Haddadi 14; Asts: Haddadi 6		Pts: Wu T.H. 16; Rebs: Wu T.H. 6 Asts: Tseng W.T. 4

Wuhan Sports Center Gymnasium, Wuhan
Referees: Dennis Barbacena (PHI), Yasser Hanoneh (SYR), Shin Gi-Rok (KOR)

September 24
18:00

Report

Japan	78–80	Lebanon
Scoring by quarter: 23–15, 19–26, 20–20, 16–19
Pts: Kawamura 20; Rebs: K. Takeuchi 13; Asts: Shonaka 8		Pts: Hoskin, Stephan, Ibrahim 16; Rebs: Hoskin 16; Asts: Akl 5

Wuhan Sports Center Gymnasium, Wuhan
Referees: Yang Maogong (CHN), Hussain Al-Bloushi (UAE), Mohammad Al-Fakhouri (SYR)

=== Semifinals ===
September 24
15:30

Report

Jordan	75–61	Philippines
Scoring by quarter: 12–18, 15–10, 22–13, 26–20
Pts: Wright 24; Rebs: Abuqoura, I. Abbas 9 Asts: Daghlas 4		Pts: Douthit 21; Rebs: Douthit 15; Asts: Casio, Douthit 3

Wuhan Sports Center Gymnasium, Wuhan
Referees: Heros Avanesian (IRI), Marwan Egho (LIB), Yuji Hirahara (JPN)

September 24
20:00

Report

South Korea	43–56	China
Scoring by quarter: 11–8, 8–13, 11–15, 13–20
Pts: Yang D.G. 17; Rebs: Moon T.J., Kim J.S. 7 Asts: Moon T.J. 4		Pts: Yi J.L. 17; Rebs: Yi J.L. 12; Asts: Liu W., Wang Z.Z. 3

Wuhan Sports Center Gymnasium, Wuhan
Referees: Cristiano Maranho (BRA), Rabah Noujaim (LIB), Amir Hossein Safarzadeh (IRI)

=== 7th place ===
September 25
13:30

Report

Chinese Taipei	72–81	Japan
Scoring by quarter: 9–28, 27–19, 17–19, 19–15
Pts: Lin C.C. 18; Rebs: Tseng W.T., Chen H.A. 7 Asts: Tseng W.T., Lin C.C. 3		Pts: Amino 14; Rebs: K. Takeuchi 22; Asts: Kawamura 3

Wuhan Sports Center Gymnasium, Wuhan
Referees: Rabah Noujaim (LIB), Amir Hossein Safarzadeh (IRI), Yasser Abbas (QAT)

=== 5th place ===
September 25
18:00

Report

Iran	87–65	Lebanon
Scoring by quarter: 15–17, 35–19, 19–19, 18–10
Pts: Kamrani, Nikkhah 18; Rebs: Haddadi 15; Asts: Kamrani 6		Pts: Hoskin 37; Rebs: Kanaan 13; Asts: Ibrahim 4

Wuhan Sports Center Gymnasium, Wuhan
Referees: Yang Maogong (CHN), Reynaldo Yante (PHI), Tan Chin Siong (MAS)

=== 3rd place ===
September 25
15:30

Report

Philippines	68–70	South Korea
Scoring by quarter: 14–7, 10–10, 23–19, 21–34
Pts: Douthit 27; Rebs: Douthit 22; Asts: Four players 2		Pts: Cho S.M. 20; Rebs: Kim J.S., Oh S.K. 9 Asts: Lee J.S. 6

Wuhan Sports Center Gymnasium, Wuhan
Referees: Heros Avanesian (IRI), Yuji Hirahara (JPN), Naser Abu Rashed (JOR)

=== Final ===
September 25
20:00

Report

Jordan	69–70	China
Scoring by quarter: 15–16, 21–15, 20–28, 13–11
Pts: Wright 26; Rebs: Z. Abbas 10; Asts: Daghlas 4		Pts: Yi J.L. 25; Rebs: Yi J.L. 16; Asts: Sun Y. 4

Wuhan Sports Center Gymnasium, Wuhan
Referees: Cristiano Maranho (BRA), Marwan Egho (LIB), Amarjot Singh Mavi (IND)

== Final standings ==
Qualified for the 2012 Summer Olympics
Qualified for the Olympic Qualifying Tournament

Rank	Team	Record
1st place, gold medalist(s)	China	9–0
2nd place, silver medalist(s)	Jordan	5–4
3rd place, bronze medalist(s)	South Korea	7–2
4	Philippines	6–3
5	Iran	8–1
6	Lebanon	4–5
7	Japan	5–4
8	Chinese Taipei	4–5
9	Syria	4–4
10	United Arab Emirates	2–6
11	Malaysia	3–5
12	Uzbekistan	1–7
13	Indonesia	2–3
14	India	1–4
15	Bahrain	1–4
16	Qatar	0–5

== Awards ==
2011 Asian champions

China
Fifteenth title

- Most Valuable Player: (China) Yi Jianlian

All-Star Team:

- PG – (Jordan) Sam Daghlas
- SG – (Japan) Takuya Kawamura
- SF – (Iran) Samad Nikkhah Bahrami
- PF – (China) Yi Jianlian
- C – (Iran) Hamed Haddadi

== Statistical leaders ==
Points

Pos.	Name	PPG
1	(Philippines) Marcus Douthit	21.9
2	(Jordan) Rasheim Wright	19.2
3	(United Arab Emirates) Ibrahim Khalfan	17.0
4	(China) Yi Jianlian	16.6
5	(Lebanon) Sam Hoskin	16.3
6	(Iran) Hamed Haddadi	15.4
7	(India) Hareesh Koroth	15.3
8	(Jordan) Sam Daghlas	14.8
9	(Bahrain) Bader Malabes	14.5
10	(Indonesia) Christian Ronaldo Sitepu	13.8

Rebounds

Pos.	Name	RPG
1	(Philippines) Marcus Douthit	12.2
2	(Iran) Hamed Haddadi	11.4
2	(Japan) Kosuke Takeuchi	11.4
4	(China) Yi Jianlian	10.8
5	(Lebanon) Sam Hoskin	10.1
6	(Malaysia) Chee Li Wei	9.1
7	(Iran) Arsalan Kazemi	8.9
8	(Syria) Eder Araujo	7.6
9	(Jordan) Zaid Abbas	7.1
10	(Indonesia) Ponsianus Nyoman Indrawan	7.0

Assists

Pos.	Name	APG
1	(Indonesia) Mario Wuysang	6.4
2	(Malaysia) Guganeswaran Batumalai	4.9
3	(Jordan) Sam Daghlas	4.6
4	(Iran) Mehdi Kamrani	4.1
4	(South Korea) Kim Joo-sung	4.1
6	(Bahrain) Bader Malabes	4.0
7	(South Korea) Yang Dong-geun	3.9
8	(Lebanon) Rodrigue Akl	3.8
9	(Chinese Taipei) Lee Hsueh-lin	3.7
10	(Japan) Takeki Shonaka	3.7

Steals

Pos.	Name	SPG
1	(United Arab Emirates) Ibrahim Khalfan	1.8
2	(China) Sun Yue	1.8
3	(Jordan) Sam Daghlas	1.8
4	(India) Talwinderjit Singh	1.8
5	(Chinese Taipei) Lee Hsueh-lin	1.7
6	(Chinese Taipei) Chang Tsung-hsien	1.6
6	(Japan) Kenta Hirose	1.6
6	(Jordan) Rasheim Wright	1.6
9	(United Arab Emirates) Khalifa Khalil	1.5
10	(Bahrain) Ahmed Malallah	1.5

Blocks

Pos.	Name	BPG
1	(Iran) Hamed Haddadi	2.9
2	(India) Amjyot Singh	1.8
3	(Jordan) Ali Jamal Zaghab	1.7
3	(Philippines) Marcus Douthit	1.7
5	(China) Sun Yue	1.4
5	(China) Yi Jianlian	1.4
7	(Indonesia) Christian Ronaldo Sitepu	1.2
8	(Syria) Abdulwahab Al-Hamwi	1.1
9	(South Korea) Kim Joo-sung	1.1
10	(South Korea) Kim Jong-kyu	0.9
