= 2010 FIBA Asia Stanković Cup =

3rd Stanković Cup
- Official logo of the 2010 FIBA Asia Stanković Cup

Tournament details
- Host country: Lebanon
- Dates: August 7–15
- Teams: 10 (from 44 federations)
- Venue: 1 (in 1 host city)

Final positions
- Champions: Lebanon (1st title)

Tournament statistics
- Top scorer: (Qatar) Ngombo (30.0)
- Top rebounds: (Iran) Kardoust (11.0)
- Top assists: (Syria) Madanly (5.8)
- PPG (Team): Lebanon (82.2)
- RPG (Team): Iran (46.4)
- APG (Team): Lebanon (17.3)

Official website
- 2010 FIBA Asia Stanković Cup

2010 FIBA Asia Stanković Cup was the 3rd FIBA Asia Stankovic Cup. The basketball tournament of FIBA Asia was held in Beirut, Lebanon from 7 August to 15 August 2010, in Ghazir Club Court, involving 10 national teams from Asia.

The 3rd FIBA Asia Stankovic Cup was the first FIBA Asia event hosted in Lebanon for national teams. The 3rd FIBA Asia Stankovic Cup was the qualifying event for the 26th FIBA Asia Championship in 2011, to be hosted in Wuhan, Hubei, China, which in turn will be the qualifying event for 2012 London Olympics. The 3rd FIBA Asia Stankovic Cup winner automatically qualified for the FIBA Asia Championship in 2011. The top five teams at the 3rd FIBA Asia Stankovic Cup earned additional berths for their respective FIBA Asia sub zones.

== Qualification ==
According to the FIBA Asia rules, each zone had one place, and the hosts (Lebanon) and Asian champion (Iran) were automatically qualified. The other three places are allocated to the zones according to performance in the 2009 FIBA Asia Championship.

East Asia (1+2)	Gulf (1)	Middle Asia (1)	Southeast Asia (1)	West Asia (2+1+1)
Chinese Taipei	Qatar	Kazakhstan	Philippines	Lebanon
Japan				Iran
~~TBD~~ *				Iraq
				Syria

* Jordan, was given a wild card entry into the championship.

== Preliminary round ==
=== Group A ===
Team	Pld	W	L	PF	PA	PD	Pts	Tiebreaker
Japan	4	3	1	316	259	+57	7	
Iran	4	2	2	302	296	+6	6	1–1 / 1.041
Chinese Taipei	4	2	2	291	288	+3	6	1–1 / 0.980
Kazakhstan	4	2	2	277	312	−35	6	1–1 / 0.980
Iraq	4	1	3	295	326	−31	5	

August 7
15:00

Report

Kazakhstan	76–65	Iraq
Scoring by quarter: 21–29, 20–11, 13–13, 22–12
Pts: Gavrilov 17; Rebs: Gavrilov 10; Asts: Tuleu 3		Pts: Shamon 22; Rebs: Four players 5 Asts: A. Amer, O. Amer 2

Ghazir Club Court, Beirut
Referees: Rabah Noujaim (LIB), Marwan Oweis (JOR), Francisco Olivar (PHI)

August 7
17:00

Report

Japan	61–58	Chinese Taipei
Scoring by quarter: 24–14, 6–12, 16–19, 15–13
Pts: Kawamura 15; Rebs: Takeuchi 8 Asts: Kawamura 3		Pts: Chien C.H. 17; Rebs: Tseng W.T., Chen T.W. 4 Asts: Tseng W.T. 3

Ghazir Club Court, Beirut
Referees: Jakub Zamojski (POL), Ferdinand Pascual (PHI), Jamal Al-Turk (SYR)

August 8
15:00

Report

Iran	72–68	Japan
Scoring by quarter: 28–19, 11–9, 15–24, 18–16
Pts: Davoudi, Kardoust 14; Rebs: Kardoust 13; Asts: Davarpanah 6		Pts: Ishizaki 20; Rebs: Ishizaki 9 Asts: Kawamura 5

Ghazir Club Court, Beirut
Referees: Ilija Belošević (SRB), Ferdinand Pascual (PHI), Marwan Oweis (JOR)

August 8
17:00

Report

Chinese Taipei	80–64	Kazakhstan
Scoring by quarter: 25–20, 11–17, 25–15, 19–12
Pts: Mao C.E. 22; Rebs: Tseng W.T. 8 Asts: Chien C.H. 10		Pts: Gavrilov 14; Rebs: Gavrilov 11; Asts: Ilyin 3

Ghazir Club Court, Beirut
Referees: Jamal Al-Turk (SYR), Francisco Olivar (PHI), Rabah Noujaim (LIB)

August 9
15:00

Report

Iraq	77–86	Chinese Taipei
Scoring by quarter: 20–21, 14–24, 30–7, 13–34
Pts: Dheyaa 27; Rebs: Salah 10; Asts: O. Amer, Abdullah 4		Pts: Chen S.N. 16; Rebs: Tseng W.T. 10; Asts: Chien C.H. 8

Ghazir Club Court, Beirut
Referees: Ferdinand Pascual (PHI), Rabah Noujaim (LIB), Marwan Oweis (JOR)

August 9
17:00

Report

Kazakhstan	80–67	Iran
Scoring by quarter: 19–18, 25–17, 17–10, 19–22
Pts: Gavrilov 22; Rebs: Gavrilov 11; Asts: Sultanov 3		Pts: Hassanzadeh 20; Rebs: Hassanzadeh 16; Asts: Davoudi 2

Ghazir Club Court, Beirut
Referees: Jakub Zamojski (POL), Jamal Al-Turk (SYR), Francisco Olivar (PHI)

August 10
15:00

Report

Japan	100–57	Kazakhstan
Scoring by quarter: 20–18, 23–10, 28–23, 29–6
Pts: Takeda 19; Rebs: Ishizaki, Takeuchi 6 Asts: Aono 5		Pts: Klimov, Gavrilov 12; Rebs: Yevstigneyev 10; Asts: Tuleu 3

Ghazir Club Court, Beirut
Referees: Rabah Noujaim (LIB), Jamal Al-Turk (SYR), Ferdinand Pascual (PHI)

August 10
17:00

Report

Iran	77–81 (OT)	Iraq
Scoring by quarter: 22–14, 16–8, 15–15, 12–28, Overtime: 12–16
Pts: Hassanzadeh 17; Rebs: Hassanzadeh 13; Asts: Kardoust 4		Pts: O. Amer 17; Rebs: Salah 11; Asts: O. Amer 5

Ghazir Club Court, Beirut
Referees: Marwan Egho (LIB), Francisco Olivar (PHI), Marwan Oweis (JOR)

August 11
15:00

Report

Chinese Taipei	67–86	Iran
Scoring by quarter: 15–17, 21–29, 16–29, 15–11
Pts: Chen S.H. 13; Rebs: Chien C.H., Lee H.L., Cheng J.W. 5 Asts: Tseng W.T., Lee H.L. 4		Pts: Kardoust 24; Rebs: Nabipour 18; Asts: Baheran 5

Ghazir Club Court, Beirut
Referees: Ilija Belošević (SRB), Marwan Egho (LIB), Francisco Olivar (PHI)

August 11
17:00

Report

Iraq	72–87	Japan
Scoring by quarter: 15–24, 20–15, 18–22, 19–26
Pts: Jassim 15; Rebs: Salah 9 Asts: O. Amer 5		Pts: Takeuchi 26; Rebs: Takeuchi 17; Asts: Kawamura 6

Ghazir Club Court, Beirut
Referees: Ferdinand Pascual (PHI), Rabah Noujaim (LIB), Jamal Al-Turk (SYR)

=== Group B ===
Team	Pld	W	L	PF	PA	PD	Pts
Lebanon	4	4	0	234	187	+47	8
Qatar	4	3	1	286	272	+14	7
Philippines	4	2	2	276	278	−2	6
Jordan	4	1	3	262	267	−5	5
Syria	4	0	4	208	262	−54	3

August 7
19:00

Report

Qatar	83–75	Syria
Scoring by quarter: 20–15, 20–14, 26–25, 17–21
Pts: Ngombo 39; Rebs: Ndour 13; Asts: Musa 6		Pts: Madanly 35; Rebs: Madanly 6 Asts: Madanly 5

Ghazir Club Court, Beirut
Referees: Yoji Fujigaki (JPN), Amir Hossein Safarzadeh (IRI), Chung Yi-chih (TPE)

August 7
21:00

Report

Philippines	59–74	Lebanon
Scoring by quarter: 11–18, 9–13, 20–20, 19–23
Pts: Casio 15; Rebs: Taulava 8 Asts: Casio, Lassiter 2		Pts: Fahed 23; Rebs: Vroman 10; Asts: Rustom, El Khatib 3

Ghazir Club Court, Beirut
Referees: Ilija Belošević (SRB), Arsen Andryushkin (KAZ), Ahmed Al-Suwaili (IRQ)

August 8
19:00

Report

Jordan	59–63	Qatar
Scoring by quarter: 15–16, 8–21, 25–10, 11–16
Pts: Soobzokov 14; Rebs: Zaghab 8 Asts: Wright 4		Pts: Ngombo 24; Rebs: Ali 9 Asts: Ngombo, Abdulrahman 2

Ghazir Club Court, Beirut
Referees: Jakub Zamojski (POL), Yoji Fujigaki (JPN), Arsen Andryushkin (KAZ)

August 8
21:00

Report

Syria	67–81	Philippines
Scoring by quarter: 22–11, 18–24, 13–28, 14–18
Pts: Madanly 27; Rebs: Madanly 9 Asts: Madanly 2		Pts: Barroca, Taulava 16; Rebs: Taulava 19; Asts: Tiu, Casio 3

Ghazir Club Court, Beirut
Referees: Amir Hossein Safarzadeh (IRI), Chen Ying-cheng (TPE), Ahmed Al-Suwaili (IRQ)

August 9
19:00

Report

Philippines	75–71	Jordan
Scoring by quarter: 12–18, 20–14, 21–16, 22–23
Pts: Baracael 16; Rebs: Taulava 12; Asts: Casio 4		Pts: Wright 17; Rebs: Z. Abbas, Al-Khas 11; Asts: Daghlas 4

Ghazir Club Court, Beirut
Referees: Ilija Belošević (SRB), Chung Yi-chih (TPE), Amir Hossein Safarzadeh (IRI)

August 9
21:00

Lebanon	20–0	Syria
Walkover

Ghazir Club Court, Beirut

August 10
19:00

Report

Qatar	66–61	Philippines
Scoring by quarter: 21–6, 16–21, 15–16, 14–18
Pts: Ngombo 29; Rebs: Turki, Ali 12; Asts: Musa, Ali 6		Pts: Tiu, Lassiter 11; Rebs: Taulava 9 Asts: Tiu 4

Ghazir Club Court, Beirut
Referees: Jakub Zamojski (POL), Arsen Andryushkin (KAZ), Chung Yi-chih (TPE)

August 10
21:00

Report

Jordan	54–63	Lebanon
Scoring by quarter: 15–19, 16–12, 9–17, 14–15
Pts: Z. Abbas 9 Rebs: Z. Abbas 9 Asts: Daghlas 3		Pts: Vroman 20; Rebs: Rustom 8 Asts: Fahed 4

Ghazir Club Court, Beirut
Referees: Ilija Belošević (SRB), Chen Ying-cheng (TPE), Yoji Fujigaki (JPN)

August 11
19:00

Report

Syria	66–78	Jordan
Scoring by quarter: 15–29, 14–19, 20–13, 17–17
Pts: Madanly 19; Rebs: Madanly 10; Asts: Madanly 7		Pts: Adais 29; Rebs: Adais 12; Asts: Daghlas 4

Ghazir Club Court, Beirut
Referees: Chung Yi-chih (TPE), Ahmed Al-Suwaili (IRQ), Arsen Andryushkin (KAZ)

August 11
21:00

Report

Lebanon	77–74 (OT)	Qatar
Scoring by quarter: 20–14, 14–19, 17–18, 14–14, Overtime: 12–9
Pts: El Khatib 18; Rebs: Kanaan 8 Asts: Fahed 4		Pts: Ngombo 26; Rebs: Ngombo, Ali 7 Asts: Ngombo, Musa, Ali 2

Ghazir Club Court, Beirut
Referees: Jakub Zamojski (POL), Amir Hossein Safarzadeh (IRI), Chen Ying-cheng (TPE)

== Classification 9th–10th ==
August 13
12:00

Report

Iraq	84–82	Syria
Scoring by quarter: 18–15, 25–16, 23–27, 18–24
Pts: Shamon 20; Rebs: Salah 10; Asts: O. Amer 12		Pts: Madanly 23; Rebs: Madanly, Osfira 10; Asts: Madanly 9

Ghazir Club Court, Beirut
Referees: Chen Ying-cheng (TPE), Antoine Khoury (LIB), Francisco Olivar (PHI)

== Final round ==
Quarterfinals
August 13
Qatar	86
Chinese Taipei	78
August 13
Japan	94
Jordan	80
August 13
Iran	67
Philippines	79
August 13
Lebanon	101
Kazakhstan	50

Semifinals
August 14
Qatar	76
Japan (OT)	78
August 14
Philippines	80
Lebanon	81

Final
August 15
Japan	59
Lebanon	97
3rd place
August 15
Qatar	80
Philippines	75

Semifinals
August 14
Chinese Taipei	70
Jordan	85
August 14
Iran	74
Kazakhstan	61

5th place
August 15
Jordan	68
Iran	57
7th place
August 15
Chinese Taipei	73
Kazakhstan	67

=== Quarterfinals ===
August 13
14:00

Report

Iran	67–79	Philippines
Scoring by quarter: 22–17, 12–14, 15–20, 18–28
Pts: Kardoust 24; Rebs: Kardoust 13; Asts: Kardoust, Nabipour 2		Pts: Baracael 18; Rebs: Tiu 7 Asts: Barroca, Tiu 4

Ghazir Club Court, Beirut
Referees: Jakub Zamojski (POL), Marwan Oweis (JOR), Marwan Egho (LIB)

August 13
16:00

Report

Qatar	86–78	Chinese Taipei
Scoring by quarter: 22–24, 26–17, 23–20, 15–17
Pts: Ngombo 33; Rebs: Ndour 13; Asts: Musa 4		Pts: Mao C.E. 16; Rebs: Tseng W.T. 6 Asts: Tseng W.T., Hung C.S. 3

Ghazir Club Court, Beirut
Referees: Ilija Belošević (SRB), Arsen Andryushkin (KAZ), Ferdinand Pascual (PHI)

August 13
18:00

Report

Lebanon	101–50	Kazakhstan
Scoring by quarter: 38–7, 18–17, 27–11, 18–15
Pts: Vroman 24; Rebs: Kanaan 7 Asts: El Khatib 7		Pts: Klimov 12; Rebs: Klimov 5 Asts: Tuleu, Sultanov 2

Ghazir Club Court, Beirut
Referees: Yoji Fujigaki (JPN), Chung Yi-chih (TPE), Ahmed Al-Suwaili (IRQ)

August 13
20:00

Report

Japan	94–80	Jordan
Scoring by quarter: 17–21, 19–21, 30–15, 28–22
Pts: Kawamura 31; Rebs: Takeuchi 9 Asts: Kawamura 6		Pts: Adais 24; Rebs: Adais 12; Asts: Daghlas 6

Ghazir Club Court, Beirut
Referees: Jamal Al-Turk (SYR), Rabah Noujaim (LIB), Amir Hossein Safarzadeh (IRI)

=== Semifinals 5th–8th ===
August 14
15:00

Report

Chinese Taipei	70–85	Jordan
Scoring by quarter: 19–21, 14–27, 22–21, 15–16
Pts: Lee H.L. 11; Rebs: Tseng W.T. 10; Asts: Chien C.H. 4		Pts: Daghlas 24; Rebs: Z. Abbas 12; Asts: Daghlas 9

Ghazir Club Court, Beirut
Referees: Arsen Andryushkin (KAZ), Francisco Olivar (PHI), Rabah Noujaim (LIB)

August 14
17:00

Report

Iran	74–61	Kazakhstan
Scoring by quarter: 26–16, 16–10, 20–20, 12–15
Pts: Kardoust 18; Rebs: Davarpanah 10; Asts: Davarpanah, Baheran 6		Pts: Gilyazutdinov 11; Rebs: Sultanov 7 Asts: Sultanov 6

Ghazir Club Court, Beirut
Referees: Ahmed Al-Suwaili (IRQ), Marwan Egho (LIB), Yoji Fujigaki (JPN)

=== Semifinals ===
August 14
19:00

Report

Qatar	76–78 (OT)	Japan
Scoring by quarter: 14–16, 19–10, 15–15, 16–23, Overtime: 12–14
Pts: Ngombo 31; Rebs: Ngombo 11; Asts: Ali 6		Pts: Kawamura 18; Rebs: Takeuchi 20; Asts: Ishizaki, Takeda 3

Ghazir Club Court, Beirut
Referees: Jakub Zamojski (POL), Chung Yi-chih (TPE), Amir Hossein Safarzadeh (IRI)

August 14
21:00

Report

Philippines	80–81	Lebanon
Scoring by quarter: 22–27, 23–22, 17–18, 18–14
Pts: Lassiter 25; Rebs: Taulava 7 Asts: Casio 7		Pts: El Khatib 25; Rebs: El Khatib 7 Asts: Fahed 5

Ghazir Club Court, Beirut
Referees: Ilija Belošević (SRB), Jamal Al-Turk (SYR), Chen Ying-cheng (TPE)

=== 7th place ===
August 15
15:00

Report

Chinese Taipei	73–67	Kazakhstan
Scoring by quarter: 12–21, 21–18, 16–8, 24–20
Pts: Hung C.S. 17; Rebs: Lee H.L. 11; Asts: Hung C.S., Lu C.J., Cheng J.W. 2		Pts: Gavrilov 18; Rebs: Gilyazutdinov 13; Asts: Tuleu, Klimov 5

Ghazir Club Court, Beirut
Referees: Amir Hossein Safarzadeh (IRI), Marwan Oweis (JOR), Ahmed Al-Suwaili (IRQ)

=== 5th place ===
August 15
17:00

Report

Jordan	68–57	Iran
Scoring by quarter: 22–12, 20–12, 14–8, 12–25
Pts: Z. Abbas 21; Rebs: Adais 11; Asts: Daghlas 4		Pts: Davarpanah 14; Rebs: Kardoust 9 Asts: Davarpanah, Kardoust 3

Ghazir Club Court, Beirut
Referees: Jamal Al-Turk (SYR), Chung Yi-chih (TPE), Arsen Andryushkin (KAZ)

=== 3rd place ===
August 15
19:00

Report

Qatar	80–75	Philippines
Scoring by quarter: 16–25, 18–15, 25–16, 21–19
Pts: Ngombo 28; Rebs: Ngombo 7 Asts: Musa 3		Pts: Baracael 21; Rebs: Taulava 11; Asts: Casio 5

Ghazir Club Court, Beirut
Referees: Marwan Egho (LIB), Rabah Noujaim (LIB), Yoji Fujigaki (JPN)

=== Final ===
August 15
21:00

Report

Japan	59–97	Lebanon
Scoring by quarter: 12–33, 12–15, 18–27, 17–22
Pts: Ishizaki 14; Rebs: Hirose 6 Asts: Sakurai 3		Pts: Fahed 23; Rebs: Kanaan 8 Asts: El Khatib 5

Ghazir Club Court, Beirut
Referees: Ilija Belošević (SRB), Jakub Zamojski (POL), Ferdinand Pascual (PHI)

== Final standing ==
Qualified for the 2011 FIBA Asia Championship

Rank	Team	Record
1st place, gold medalist(s)	Lebanon	7–0
2nd place, silver medalist(s)	Japan	5–2
3rd place, bronze medalist(s)	Qatar	5–2
4	Philippines	3–4
5	Jordan	3–4
6	Iran	3–4
7	Chinese Taipei	3–4
8	Kazakhstan	2–5
9	Iraq	2–3
10	Syria	0–5

== Awards ==
2010 Stanković Cup Champions

Lebanon
First title
