= Saeed Al Ghafri =

Emirati association football player (born 1996)

Saeed Al Ghafri سعيد الغافري
Personal information
- Full name: Saeed Salem Jumah Al Ghafri
- Date of birth: 7 July 1996 (age 30)
- Place of birth: Emirates
- Height: 1.62 m (5 ft 4 in)
- Position: Forward

Youth career
- 2008–2017: Emirates

Senior career*
Years	Team	Apps	(Gls)
2017–2022	Emirates	35	(1)
2022	Al Rams	17	(1)
2022–2023	Al Taawon		
- * Club domestic league appearances and goals

Saeed Al Ghafri (Arabic:سعيد الغافري) (born 7 July 1996) is an Emirati footballer who plays as a forward.

== Career ==
Al Ghafri started his career at Emirates Club and is a product of the Emirates's youth system. On 2 February 2018, Al Ghafri made his professional debut for Emirates Club against Shabab Al-Ahli in the Pro League, replacing Ahmed Malallah.
