= Marcus Douthit =

Filipino-American basketball player (born 1980)

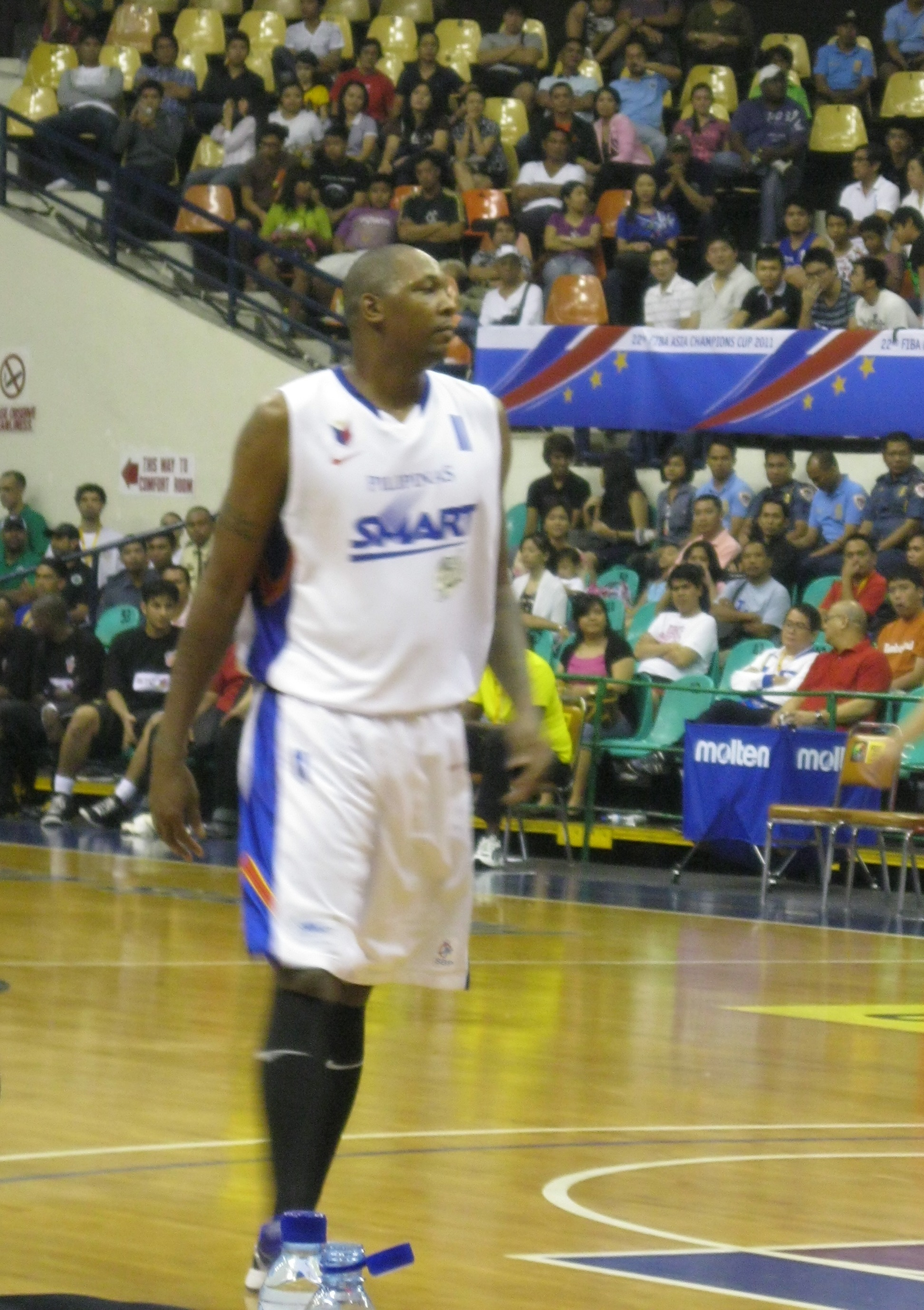
- Douthit with Smart Gilas in 2011

Personal information
- Born: April 15, 1980 (age 46) Syracuse, New York, U.S.
- Listed height: 6 ft 11 in (2.11 m)
- Listed weight: 233 lb (106 kg)

Career information
- High school: Notre Dame Prep (Fitchburg, Massachusetts)
- College: Providence (2000–2004)
- NBA draft: 2004: 2nd round, 56th overall pick
- Drafted by: Los Angeles Lakers
- Playing career: 2004–2019
- Position: Center

Career history
- 2004–2005: Verviers-Pepinster
- 2005: Spirou Charleroi
- 2005–2006: Albuquerque Thunderbirds
- 2006: Champville SC
- 2006–2007: Albuquerque Thunderbirds
- 2007: Daegu Orions
- 2007–2009: Antalya Büyükşehir Belediyesi
- 2009: Cangrejeros de Santurce
- 2009: Marinos de Anzoategui
- 2009–2010: Krasnye Krylya Samara
- 2011–2012: Foshan Dralions
- 2012: Air21 Express
- 2015: Blackwater Elite
- 2017: Hanoi Buffaloes
- 2017: Nakhon Pathom Mad Goat
- 2018: Mekong United BC
- 2019: Kabayan Pilipinas
- Stats at Basketball Reference

Marcus Eugene Douthit (born April 15, 1980) is a Filipino-American former basketball player. He graduated from Providence College. After his stint with the Providence Friars, he was selected by the Los Angeles Lakers of the National Basketball Association (NBA) in the 2004 NBA draft. Born in Syracuse, New York, he became a naturalized Filipino citizen on March 11, 2011, thus allowing him to play for the Philippines' men's national basketball team.

== Early life ==
Douthit was born in Syracuse, New York to his mother, Melody Douthit. He played high school basketball at Notre Dame Preparatory School, a private, co-educational Catholic high school located in Fitchburg, Massachusetts. The school is primarily known for its basketball program, which has produced notable players such as Michael Beasley, Paul Harris, Lazar Hayward, and Derrick Caracter, to name a few. Before transferring to Notre Dame Prep for his senior year, Douthit played at St. Thomas Aquinas High School in New Britain, Connecticut, the same school that produced Lamar Odom, where he averaged 18 points, 15 rebounds, and four blocks per game.

== College basketball career ==
On November 18, 1999, Providence Friars head coach Tim Welsh announced that Douthit has signed a national letter-of-intent to attend Providence College for the 2000–01 school year. Eventually, Douthit would stay at Providence for four consecutive years, taking up a bachelor's degree in Social Science. During his freshman year, he was able to record his first career double-double against Brown University by scoring a career-high 22 points and collecting 11 rebounds.

As a junior in Providence, Douthit finished 11th in the NCAA Men's Division I with an average of 3.0 blocks per game. The following year as a senior, he improved to seventh with an average of 3.2 blocks per game, third in the Big East Conference. He finished his college career ranking second all-time in blocks at his school with 295.

Douthit spent four years playing for the Friars. Along with teammate Ryan Gomes, a former member of the Los Angeles Clippers, he was a member of the 2003–04 Providence Friars team that finished with an 11–5 conference record, 20–9 overall. During his junior and senior years playing for Providence, Douthit was awarded the team's Marvin Barnes Defensive Player Award.

== Professional basketball career ==
=== National Basketball Association ===
Douthit was selected by the Los Angeles Lakers in the second round of the 2004 NBA draft with the 56th overall pick. However, he decided to play ball in Belgium instead since the Lakers already had 15 players on the roster, and it was still awaiting the decision of Karl Malone if he would join the team. Although he never played in the NBA, Douthit had several close stints in signing with a couple of ball clubs, specifically the Los Angeles Lakers and the Los Angeles Clippers.

==== Los Angeles Lakers ====
During the 2006–07 NBA season, the Lakers announced that they would sign Douthit after playing professional ball in Europe. Shortly after, the team placed him on waivers. Douthit along with other aspirants such as J. R. Pinnock, Mamadou N'diaye, and Devin Green were all cut by the Lakers before the start of the regular season.

==== Los Angeles Clippers ====
The Los Angeles Clippers, on the other hand, signed Douthit and Jamaican professional basketball player Kimani Ffriend in the 2007–08 NBA season, including them in the team's training camp roster. After not playing in the first two preseason games of the team, Douthit was waived by the Clippers.

=== NBA Development League ===
Douthit played for the Albuquerque Thunderbirds in the NBA Development League, the official minor league organization of the National Basketball Association, during the 2005–06 season. Playing under coach Michael Cooper, he was part of the team's starting lineup along with Tony Bland, T. J. Cummings, Andreas Glyniadakis, and Tierre Brown.

While playing for the Thunderbirds, Douthit averaged 16.3 points and 8.6 rebounds per contest. Douthit also helped the team defeat the Fort Worth Flyers, 119–108, to win the 2005–06 NBA Development League Championship, scoring 11 points and collecting 15 rebounds during the championship game.

=== European career ===
==== Belgium ====
Before playing in the NBA D-League, Douthit played in the Basketball League Belgium, also known as the Ligue Ethias, which is the highest professional basketball league in the country. In Belgium, he played for RBC Verviers-Pepinster and Spirou Charleroi, and averaged 7.9 points and 6.0 rebounds while playing for these ball clubs.

==== Turkey ====
Douthit has played for basketball club Antalya Büyükşehir Belediyesi in Turkey during the 2007–08 season. That year, the team finished sixth in the league with a total 18 wins, qualifying them to the playoffs. The club was eventually eliminated by Turkish team Fenerbahçe Ülkerspor. While playing for Antalya in Turkey's top men's professional basketball league, Turkish Basketball League, Douthit averaged 13.2 points and 6.5 rebounds.

==== Russia ====
After several stints in a number of professional leagues in Europe, Douthit suited up for BC Krasnye Krylya Samara in Russia. Based in the city of Samara, the club plays in the Russian Basketball Super League. During the 2009–10 season, the club also participated in the 2010 EuroChallenge, organized by FIBA Europe. Douthit averaged 11.5 points and 7.6 rebounds in 11 games in that year's EuroChallenge.

=== Asian career ===
==== South Korea ====
To cap the 2006–07 season, after playing in the NBA D-League, Douthit joined the Daegu Orions in the Korean Basketball League, which is the professional basketball league of South Korea.

==== Philippines ====
In May 2010, Samahang Basketbol ng Pilipinas announced that Douthit has been invited to try out for a spot in the Philippines men's national basketball team, Smart Gilas. He suited up for the team, spearheaded by former Iran national team head coach Rajko Toroman, in the 2010 MVP Invitational Champions' Cup.

Douthit joins notable Filipino basketball players Marcio Lassiter, J.V. Casio, Japeth Aguilar, Dylan Ababou, and Chris Tiu, who are members of the Gilas squad. On February 25, 2011, he scored 16 points and collected 26 rebounds in his debut game with Gilas in the Philippine Basketball Association against the Talk 'N Text Tropang Texters. He played for the Air21 Express as an import during the 2012 PBA Commissioner's Cup.

==== China ====
In October 2011, it was reported that Douthit has come to terms on a five-month contract to play for the Foshan Dralions, a club based in Foshan, Guangdong that plays in the Chinese Basketball Association. The team is coached by former NBA player Jay Humphries.

==== Back to the Philippines ====
In January 2015, he signed for Blackwater Elite as an import and replaced Chris Charles who was injured. His team got their first win for the 2015 PBA Commissioner's Cup against the defending champions, San Miguel Beermen, in a score of 88–77.

In September 2016, Douthit was signed in by Mighty Sports to play for the club in the 2016 Merlion Cup in Singapore where the team finished second. and in February 2017 he was re-signed in by Mighty Sports to play for the club in the 2017 Dubai International Basketball Championship.

==== Thailand ====
On January 3, 2017, it was reported that Douthit signed a contract to play for the Hanoi Buffaloes, a Vietnamese ball club which will compete at the Thailand Basketball Super League. He stayed in that league, playing for the Mekong United Raptors and Kabayan Philippines.

== Basketball career statistics ==
Legend
GP	Games played	MPG	Minutes per game
FG%	Field-goal percentage	3P%	3-point field-goal percentage	FT%	Free-throw percentage
RPG	Rebounds per game	APG	Assists per game	SPG	Steals per game
BPG	Blocks per game	PPG	Points per game	**Bold**	Career high

Correct as of 10 May 2012

=== Regular season ===
Year	Team	GP	MPG	FG%	3P%	FT%	RPG	APG	SPG	BPG	PPG
2010–11	Smart Gilas	12	39.25	**.540**	0.000	.521	17.67	2.17	0.92	**3.25**	**22.33**
2011–12	Air21 Express	9	**42.00**	.365	0.000	.639	**20.33**	**3.78**	1.22	2.22	20.33
2011–12	Foshan Dralions	**29**	29.40	.522	0.000	**.751**	10.70	2.00	**1.50**	1.60	19.80

=== International tournaments ===
Year	Team	GP	MPG	FG%	3P%	FT%	RPG	APG	SPG	BPG	PPG
2012 Jones Cup	Smart Gilas	8	29.13	.630	0.000	.725	10.87	1.75	**1.38**	1.38	**16.13**
2012 FIBA Asia Cup	Smart Gilas	6	31.00	**.655**	**1.000**	.581	**11.30**	1.20	0.83	1.66	15.20
2013 FIBA Asia Championship	Philippine National Basketball Team	8	25.62	.432	0.000	**.758**	9.38	1.62	0.5	**2.0**	11.80

== International basketball career ==
=== Philippine national team ===
Douthit first suited up as an import for Gilas at the 2010 MVP Invitational Champions' Cup, which was held from June 24 to 27 at the Ninoy Aquino Stadium. He helped the nationals beat the Jordan national basketball team in the championship game, scoring 10 points and grabbing 11 rebounds. Toroman, a former assistant coach of the national squad of Yugoslavia from 1991 to 1995, was impressed with Douthit's performance and recommended him to be Gilas’ top prospect for naturalization.

In June 2010, the Samahang Basketbol ng Pilipinas (SBP) announced that Douthit agreed to sign a one-year contract and undergo the naturalization process. After the process, he would be allowed to represent the Philippines as a full-fledged Filipino in international competitions such as the 2011 FIBA Asia Championship, a qualifying tournament of the 2012 Summer Olympics in London.

Douthit's represented the Philippines at the 2010 William Jones Cup, an international basketball tournament held from July 14 to 22 in Taipei, Taiwan. Smart Gilas finished third in the tournament, improving the country's sixth-place finish from the previous year. In the tournament, Douthit was named a member of the All-Tournament Team along with Yuta Tabuse (Japan), Lee Hsueh-lin (Taiwan), Samad Nikkhah Bahrami (Iran), and Takuya Kawamura (Japan).

Because he and Gilas teammate Chris Lutz have not secured a Filipino passport in time for the competition, Douthit did not suit up for the team at the FIBA Asia Stanković Cup 2010, held from August 7 to 15 in Beirut, Lebanon. Douthit first represented the Philippines as a naturalized Filipino in the 2011 FIBA Asia Champions Cup, which was held in Pasig, Philippines from May 28 to June 5, 2011.

Douthit also represented the Philippines in both the 2011 William Jones Cup and 2011 FIBA Asia Championship. In that year's FIBA Asia Championship, he averaged 21.9 points and 12.2 rebounds for Smart Gilas, which finished fourth overall in the tournament.

In 2012, Douthit helped Gilas get as far as the semifinals of the 2012 FIBA Asia Cup.

In the 2013 FIBA Asia Championship, Douthit led Gilas to the semis. There, against South Korea, he got injured but his teammates stepped up and defeated South Korea to get into the finals. Gilas finished the tournament with a silver medal.

For the 2014 FIBA World Cup, Douthit wasn't fielded by Gilas, and his spot went to Andray Blatche. Due to Blatche's ineligibility in the 2014 Asian Games, he was able to play for Gilas once again. Against Kazakhstan, with Gilas needing to win by 11 to get into the semifinals, he tried scoring on his own goal to send the game to overtime where they could have won by the needed margin, but the basket was nullified and Gilas won by only two points.

In 2015, Douthit was called up for that year's SEA Games. He helped lead Gilas to a gold medal. In August of that year, he confirmed that the SBP decided not to renew his contract, ending his time with Gilas.

== Filipino naturalization ==
I'll never have Filipino blood, but as far as becoming a Filipino, I'll always have it in my heart."

— Marcus Eugene Douthit

In February 2011, former Samahang Basketbol ng Pilipinas executive director Noli Eala announced that Douthit's application for Filipino naturalization has already been transmitted for signature to the office of Philippine President Benigno Aquino III. Thirty days after February 9, the day the application reached the president's office at Malacañan Palace, Douthit would secure his Filipino citizenship with or without Aquino's signature.

On March 11, 2011, Republic Act No. 10148 introduced by Antipolo Second District Congressman Robbie Puno, which grants Filipino citizenship to Douthit, lapsed into law after President Aquino failed to sign it.

Douthit's eligibility to play for the Smart Gilas Pilipinas national basketball team was confirmed by FIBA Sport and Eligibility committee head Ivanka Toteva in June 2011. With the confirmation, Douthit will be allowed to represent the Philippines as a naturalized player in all FIBA sanctioned events.

== Player profile ==
Douthit is 2.11 m (6 ft 11 in) tall, and is usually tasked to play the center and power forward positions. He is often described as a versatile big man who loves to crash the boards and score off garbage points, with a steady perimeter shot. With his 7-4 wingspan, Douthit has incredible reach as well, which makes him a prolific shot blocker. Tim Welsh, Douthit's former coach at Providence, once said that, "Marcus runs the court very well and handles the ball well for a big man. He's not a back-to-the basket player, he's a face-up player which is what makes him perfect for our style of play... He's also a tremendous shot blocker who has great timing and makes it difficult for people to score over him." Douthit is also often compared to Haitian Canadian professional basketball player Samuel Dalembert.

== Coaching career ==
During the 2019–20 season, Douthit joined the coaching staff of the Community College of Rhode Island (CCRI) Knights basketball team. In 2022, he had a stint as the head coach of the Beantown Bisons in the American Basketball Association. A month later, he became CCRI's head coach. In his first year, the Knights finished the season 14–15 overall and earned the No. 8 seed in the NJCAA Region XXI Tournament. The following season, they finished 11–10 in league play to earn the No. 6 seed in the NCJAA Region XXI Tournament. After that season, he was replaced as head coach.

== Awards and honors ==
- William Jones Cup Champion: 2012
- SEABA Champion: 2011, 2012, 2015
- William Jones Cup Third Place: 2011
- William Jones Cup All-Tournament Team: 2010, 2012
- 2x Marvin Barnes Defensive Player Award: 2003, 2004

== See also ==
- 2003–04 Providence Friars men's basketball team
- 2004–05 FIBA Europe League
- 2004–05 Los Angeles Lakers season
