= Thabet =

Thabet is both a surname and a given name. Notable people with the name include:

- Fatma Thabet (born 1961), Tunisian politician
- Hasheem Thabeet (born 1987), Tanzanian basketball player
- Kamel Amin Thaabet (1924–1965), Israeli spy
- Laure Thabet (1896–1981), Lebanese women's rights activist
- Nada Thabet, Egyptian disability rights advocate
- Safwan Thabet (born 1946), Egyptian businessman
- Tarek Thabet (born 1971), Tunisian footballer
- Thabet El-Batal (1953–2005), Egyptian footballer
- Thaer Thabet, Iraqi journalist
- Yasser Thabet (born 1964), Egyptian journalist

== See also ==
- Tabet
