= Tabet =

- Language: تابت (Arabic)

Origin
- Language: Arabic
- Origin: Lebanon

Other names
- Related names: Thabet

Tabet (Arabic: تابت) is a predominant Maronite Catholic surname found in Lebanon, as well as Venezuela, Canada, the United States, and Brazil. Notable people with the surname include:

- André Tabet (1902–1981), French Algerian screenwriter
- Antonio Tabet (born 1974), Brazilian publicist, writer and humorist
- Ayoub Tabet (1884–1947), Lebanese politician
- Charles Tabet (born 1987), American-Lebanese basketball player
- Georges Tabet (1905–1984), French Algerian screenwriter
- Maia Tabet, Arabic-English literary translator
- Maurice Tabet (1919–2014), Lebanese sports shooter
- Mustapha Tabet (1949–1993), Moroccan serial rapist
- Nadim Tabet (born 1982), Lebanese filmmaker
- Paul Fouad Tabet (1929–2009), Lebanese-born Catholic prelate
- Paul Marwan Tabet (born 1961), Lebanese maronite catholic bishop in Canada
- Philip Tabet (born 1987), American–Lebanese basketball player
- Rayyane Tabet (born 1983), Lebanese visual artist
- Sabri Tabet (born 1977), French footballer
- Sandy Tabet (born 1995), Lebanese beauty pageant titleholder
- Sylvio Tabet, Lebanese filmmaker and producer
