= Jet Chang =

Taiwanese basketball player (born 1988)

Jet Chang 張宗憲
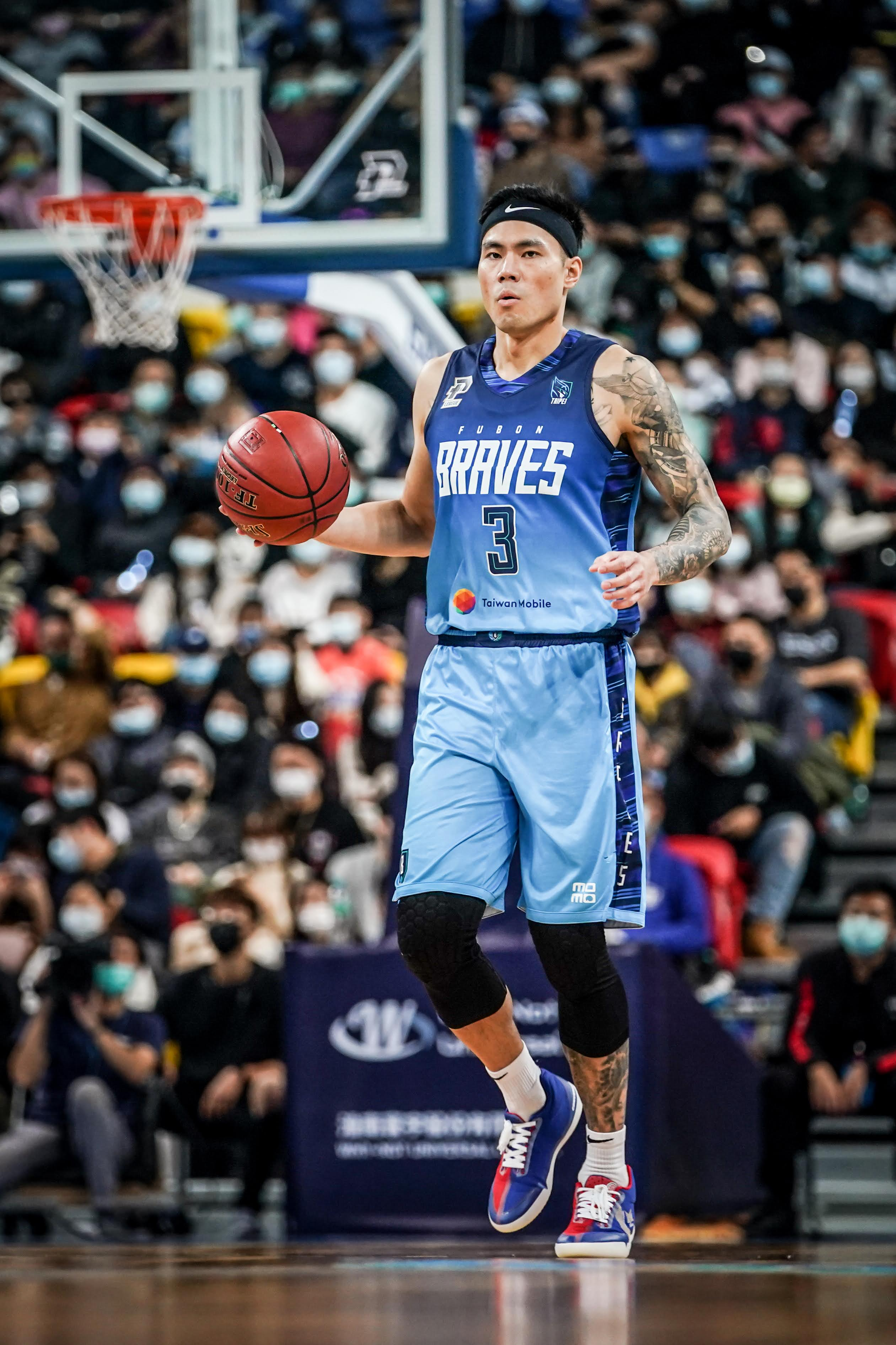
- Chang in 2021

No. 3 – Formosa Dreamers
- Position: Shooting guard
- League: Taiwan Professional Basketball League

Personal information
- Born: December 27, 1988 (age 37) Yilan, Taiwan
- Listed height: 192 cm (6 ft 4 in)
- Listed weight: 88 kg (194 lb)

Career information
- High school: Xinrong Senior High School (Tainan)
- College: BYU–Hawaii (2008-2012)
- NBA draft: 2012: undrafted
- Playing career: 2007–present

Career history
- 2007: BG 74 Göttingen II
- 2012–2013: Guangxi Rhinos
- 2013–2015: Sichuan Blue Whales
- 2015: Kia Carnival
- 2016–2019: Fubon Braves
- 2019–2020: Formosa Dreamers
- 2020–2024: Taipei Fubon Braves
- 2024–present: Formosa Dreamers

Career highlights
- TPBL champion (2026); 3× P.League+ Champion (2021–2023); SBL Champion (2019); P. League+ MVP (2021); P.League+ First Team (2021); P.League+ All-Defensive Team (2021); SBL First Team (2018); 2× SBL All-Star (2018, 2019); NCAA Division II Tournament MOP (2011)

Tsung-Hsien "Jet" Chang (Chinese: 張宗憲; pinyin: Zhāng Zōngxiàn; born December 27, 1988) is a Taiwanese professional basketball player for the Formosa Dreamers of the Taiwan Professional Basketball League (TPBL). A former player for the BYU–Hawaii Seasiders in Hawaii, United States, he led the Seasiders to a runner-up finish in the 2011 NCAA Division II tournament, in which he was named Most Outstanding Player. He then went on to win championships in Taiwan and also play in China and the Philippines. Chang also played for the Chinese Taipei national basketball team and made his national team debut at the 2009 FIBA Asia Championship.

== Amateur career ==
From Yilan, Chang studied at Xinrong Senior High School in Tainan. He started playing basketball at the age of eight years old against his older brother. Inspired by the anime Slam Dunk, he joined the basketball team when he was in the fourth grade. In high school, he led Xinrong to the HBL title and also won the HBL Slam Dunk Contest twice. As a sophomore, reports said that he could dunk from a step outside the free throw line. Taiwan Hoops, a publication in Taiwan, called him “one of the most physically gifted athletes” the country has ever produced. With his athleticism, fans started calling him "Jet".

== College career ==
After his stint in Germany, Chang played for the BYU–Hawaii Seasiders in the NCAA Division II. Although he had offers from several other schools such as Cal-Berkeley, other schools didn't pursue him after learning that he wasn't proficient in English. He chose BYU–Hawaii after being recruited by player Wu Tai-Hao. In his rookie season, he earned the role of sixth man for the Seasiders, and won Rookie of the Year averaging 12.3 points. BYU–Hawaii also won the Pacific West Conference behind his and JR Buensuceso's performances. By his sophomore season, he was a starter and averaged 19.2 points (highest on the team), although he only played 17 games due to an arm injury.

In his junior year, he led the Seasiders to their best record of 22–9. In the semifinal, he scored a career-high 43 points over the undefeated West Liberty to send the Seasiders to the national finals. In the national finals, he scored 35 points and almost led the Seasiders to the win over Bellarmine. However, he missed a three-pointer in the closing seconds that could have sent the game into overtime. Still, for his performance over the last few games, he was named the Division II Most Outstanding Player (MOP). He was the first player from the losing team to be awarded as MOP since Kentucky Wesleyan’s Antonio Garcia in 1998.

For his senior season, Chang was the preseason pick for Player of the Year. He was also invited to the Portsmouth Invitational Tournament for the nation’s top seniors, becoming the first Asian to be invited to the tournament. In the final game of the tournament, he scored 20 points. In his final season, he averaged 17.8 points and 3.5 rebounds. He made the NCAA Division II First Team, the Presidents' Athletic Department All-American Division II Second Team and was awarded as the PacWest Conference Player of the Year. However, their record went down to 17–10, and did not qualify for the Division II tournament.

== Professional career ==
=== BG 74 Göttingen II ===
After graduating from high school, Chang moved to Germany to hone his skills. Their coach had personally asked him to play for them.

=== Guangxi Rhinos ===
In 2012, after going undrafted in the 2012 NBA draft, Chang was added to the Minnesota Timberwolves' summer league team, but did not play at all throughout the tournament. He then joined the Guangxi Rhinos in the Chinese Basketball Association (CBA).

=== Sichuan Blue Whales ===
Chang then played for another CBA team, the Sichuan Blue Whales. In his first season with the Blue Whales, he averaged 12.4 points and 3.2 rebounds per game. In his second season, he got to be teammates with former NBA champion Metta World Peace.

=== KIA Carnival ===
In 2015, the KIA Carnival of the Philippine Basketball Association (PBA) signed Chang to be their Asian import for the 2015 Governors' Cup. This gave him the opportunity to reunite with BYU–Hawaii teammate JR Buensuceso. In his PBA debut, he contributed 14 points and four steals in a win over the San Miguel Beermen. In a double-overtime win over the Blackwater Elite, he scored 25 points.

=== Fubon Braves ===
After his PBA stint, in 2016, Chang applied for the Super Basketball League (SBL) draft. He was drafted with the first overall pick by Kinmen Kaoliang Liquor Basketball that year. On August 3, the team traded him to the Fubon Braves for two players and the Braves' first round pick for 2017. A month later, he signed a three-year deal with the Braves. During this time, he suffered from chondromalacia patellae in his left knee and bone spurs in his left ankle, and played only 10 games in his first season. In the offseason, he underwent a cartilage transplant and underwent a long rehabilitation process. In 2018, he then scored a SBL career-high 26 points in a win over the Taoyuan Pauian Archiland.

=== Formosa Dreamers ===
On September 5, 2019, Chang joined the Formosa Dreamers to play for them in the ASEAN Basketball League (ABL). He was the team's leading scorer, averaging 13.4 points, 3.2 rebounds, 2.7 assists and 1.3 steals in 14 games. However, he didn't get to finish the season with them as the season was suspended due to the COVID-19 pandemic.

On July 15, 2020, while his contract with Formosa was being renewed, Chang was found to be carrying and smoking an e-cigarette containing marijuana oil, suspected of violating the "Drug Hazard Prevention Act". According to him, the e-cigarette containing marijuana oil was given to him by a friend and he did not know that the e-cigarette contained marijuana ingredients. Initially suspending him, the team decided to not renew his contract, although they promised to assist him in his rehabilitation.

=== Return to Taipei Fubon Braves ===
On October 27, 2020, Chang returned to the Taipei Fubon Braves on the conditions that he "strictly regulate his future behavior", "actively engage in public welfare", and "pay attention to his personal life behavior". In his debut, he scored 34 points. For his first season with the team, he averaged 15.6 points, 2.9 assists, and 2.5 rebounds per game, winning MVP and making the P-League+'s first team and All-Defensive team. Taipei also won the championship that season.

The following season, Chang averaged 12.5 points, 3.1 rebounds, 3.4 assists and 1.3 steals and helped Taipei defend its title. On October 6, 2022, Taipei extended his contract for two more years. Taipei won its third consecutive title the following season.

In his final season with the team, he only played 16 games for them due to injury. On June 30, 2024, the team announced the early termination of their contract with him.

=== Return to Formosa Dreamers ===
On July 12, 2024, Chang returned to the Formosa Dreamers of the Taiwan Professional Basketball League (TPBL). According to him, he re-signed with Formosa to move on from the marijuana incident and to finish the season with them after failing to do so last time because of the pandemic. This time, he was not the scoring leader, but took on a veteran role within the team. He helped them start the season with two straight wins.

On August 20, 2026, Chang re-signed with the Formosa Dreamers of the Taiwan Professional Basketball League (TPBL).

== National team career ==
Chang played primarily off the bench for the Chinese Taipei national basketball team at the 2009 FIBA Asia Championship as the youngest player on the team. In his most extensive action of the tournament, he had game highs in points in Chinese Taipei's preliminary round victory over Uzbekistan and narrow eighth final loss against South Korea. Chang also played for Chinese Taipei in the 2011 FIBA Asia Championship. In 2012, he played in the William Jones Cup and the 2012 FIBA Asia Cup. An injury in the 2015 Jones Cup kept him out of playing in the 2015 FIBA Asia Championship. In 2018, he was listed in the national team pool for the 2019 FIBA World Cup Asian qualifiers, but had to back out due to injury.

In recent years, Chang has been critical of the national team, calling them out for how they select players for the national team. He has also called them out for lack of insurance coverage and injury compensation, revealing that he once had to cover expenses upfront after only receiving NT$30,000 for a broken finger.

== Endorsements ==
For most of his early career, Chang was a Nike endorser. In 2021, he was the first Taiwanese basketball player to be signed by Converse. In 2023, he signed with 361 Degrees, becoming the brand's first Taiwanese endorser. However, a year later, he went back to wearing Nike and Converse as 361° failed to pay him.

Chang is also an endorser of BRIEFING, a travel bag and luggage brand, and URSA Sportswear.

== Personal life ==
Chang's girlfriend is Alisa, a Russian model and voice actress. They have a son together.

Chang hosts a podcast, "Joe and Jet Unfiltered with Jason", alongside Joseph Lin and former basketball coach Jiang Zhizhen.
