= Philip Tabet =

American–Lebanese basketball player (born 1987)

Personal information
- Born: July 1, 1987 (age 39) Bloomfield Hills, Michigan
- Listed height: 2.05 m (6 ft 9 in)
- Listed weight: 104 kg (229 lb)

Career information
- High school: Detroit Country Day School (Beverly Hills, Michigan)
- College: South Alabama (2006–2010)
- NBA draft: 2010: undrafted
- Playing career: 2011–present
- Position: Center / power forward
- Number: 11

Career history
- 2012–2013: Hekmeh BC
- 2013–2014: Champville SC
- 2014–2015: Tadamon Zouk
- 2015: Homenetmen Beirut

Philip Tabet (born July 1, 1987) is a Lebanese professional basketball player currently playing for Champville SC in the Lebanese Basketball League. Tabet was put on the Lebanese Free agent List to play for the national squad along with twin brother Charles Tabet. Tabet started his college career at the University of South Alabama before deciding to move to Lebanon to sign his first professional contract for the Lebanese green castle Hekmeh BC along with twin brother Charles. However, in 2014 Phillip split from his brother to join Beirut side Champville SC.
