= Mohammed Ibrahim (basketball) =

Lebanese basketball player

Personal information
- Born: April 10, 1983 (age 43) Ras Beirut, Lebanon
- Listed height: 1.93 m (6 ft 4 in)

Career information
- College: Louisiana Tech (2005–2006); Incarnate Word (2006–2007)
- Playing career: 2003–2018
- Position: Point guard / shooting guard

Career history
- 2003–2005: Al Riyadi
- 2008–2009: Al Riyadi
- 2009–2010: Al Mouttahed Tripoli
- 2010–2011: Al Riyadi
- 2011–2012: Champville
- 2012–2013: Sagesse
- 2013–2015: Byblos
- 2015–2016: Tadamon Zouk
- 2016–2017: Sagesse

Mohammed Majed Ibrahim (in Arabic: محمد إبراهيم; born April 10, 1983) is a Lebanese former professional basketball player. He spent the majority of his career playing in the Lebanese Basketball League, playing the point guard and shooting guard positions. Mohammed has represented the Lebanese national basketball team multiple times.

== Career ==
From 2003 to 2005, he played for Lebanese Basketball League team Al Riyadi. He then moved back to the US and played Division 1 basketball for the Louisiana Tech in 2005–06. He then played Division 2 basketball in 2006–07 for the Incarnate Word.

He then moved back to Lebanon and played for Al Riyadi in 2008–09. He then played the 2009–10 season with Al Mouttahed Tripoli but returned to Al Riyadi for 2010–11. After the 2011 FIBA Asia Championship, he signed with Champville. After a season with Champville, he moved to Sagesse for 2012–13. In 2013–14, he played one game for Sagesse before moving to Byblos in January 2014. Then he moved to Tadamon Club before returning to Sagesse Club.

== National team ==
Mohammed was part of the Lebanon national basketball team for the 2003 ABC Championship and also the 2011 FIBA Asia Championship.
