= Ghaleb Rida =

Lebanese basketball player (born 1981)

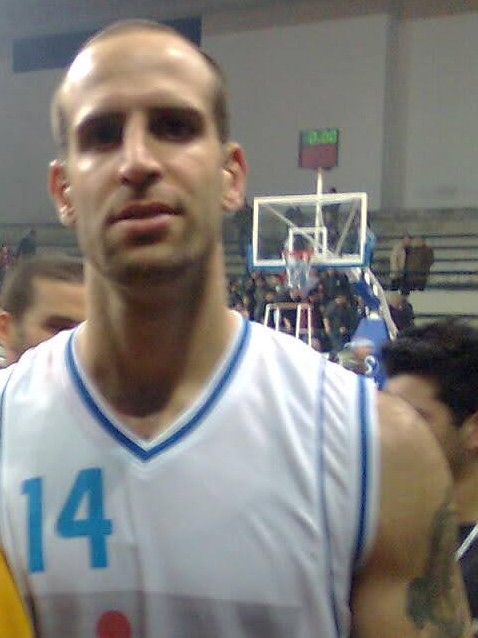
- Ghaleb Reda with Champville in 2010

Amchit Club
- Position: Shooting Guard
- League: Lebanese Basketball League

Personal information
- Born: July 10, 1981 (age 45) Nabatieh, Lebanon
- Listed height: 6 ft 3 in (1.91 m)
- Listed weight: 205 lb (93 kg)

Career information
- Playing career: 1999–2014

Career history
- 1999–2006: Sporting Al Riyadi Beirut
- 2006–2008: Champville SC
- 2008–2009: Tebnin SC
- 2009–2010: Champville SC
- 2010–2011: Sagesse
- 2011–2012: Anibal Zahle
- 2012–2014: Amchit Club

Ghaleb Rida or Ghaleb Reda (Arabic: غالب رضا); (born July 10, 1981, in Nabatieh, Lebanon) is a professional Lebanese basketball player for sagesse Club and a member of Lebanon national basketball team as a shooting guard. He is 1.90 m (6 ft 3 in) tall.

His former clubs included Sporting Al Riyadi Beirut, Champville SC, Tebnin SC, Sagesse and Anibal Zahle.

When young he was monitored by many scouts, he was approached by the San Antonio Spurs.
