= Sam Hoskin =

American-Lebanese basketball player

Personal information
- Born: December 29, 1979 (age 46) Detroit, Michigan, U.S.
- Listed height: 6 ft 9 in (2.06 m)
- Listed weight: 224.4 lb (102 kg)

Career information
- High school: Bishop Borgess (Detroit, Michigan)
- College: Eastern Kentucky (1999–2000); Schoolcraft JC (2000–2001); DePaul (2001–2003)
- NBA draft: 2003: undrafted
- Playing career: 2003–2017
- Position: Power forward / center

Career history
- 2003–2004: Hapoel Galil Elyon
- 2004–2005: Ural Great Perm
- 2005–2006: Dynamo Moscow Region
- 2006–2007: Ural Great Perm
- 2007: Olympiacos
- 2007–2008: Cibona Zagreb
- 2008–2009: Zhejiang Whirlwinds
- 2010: Bnei HaSharon
- 2011: Shahrdari Gorgan
- 2011–2012: Champville
- 2012–2013: Jilin Northeast Tigers
- 2014: Marinos de Anzoátegui
- 2014–2015: Zamalek
- 2015: Shahrdari Gorgan
- 2015–2016: Club Malvín
- 2016: Club Atlético Lanús

Career highlights
- Lebanese League champion (2012)

Samuel Lonzo Hoskin (born December 29, 1979) is an American-Lebanese former professional basketball player.

== Career ==
Hoskin was born in Detroit, Michigan. He played his high school basketball at Bishop Borgess High School in Detroit. Hoskin played collegiately at Eastern Kentucky University and at De Paul University located in Chicago, Illinois and was voted second team All-USA in 2003.

In the 2003–04 season Hoskin was the last cut by the Seattle SuperSonics. Afterward he played in Israel and became one of the top scores and rebounders in the Israel Basketball League. He later played in Russia for clubs Ural Great Perm and Dynamo Moscow Region and became one of the top scorers and rebounders in the Russian league as well. Hoskin also played for Olympiacos and Cibona both Euroleague teams located in Athens, Greece and Zagreb, Croatia respectively.

Hoskin won a championship with club Champville SC in Lebanon.

In August 2012, Hoskin signed with Jilin Northeast Tigers for the 2012–13 CBA season.

In June 2017, Hoskin retired from professional basketball and become an assistant coach and coach of player development in China at the Zhejiang Golden Bulls.
