= Charles Tabet =

American-Lebanese basketball player (born 1987)

Personal information
- Born: 1 July 1987 (age 39) Bloomfield Hills, Michigan
- Listed height: 2.05 m (6 ft 9 in)
- Listed weight: 107 kg (236 lb)

Career information
- High school: Detroit Country Day School (Beverly Hills, Michigan)
- College: South Alabama (2006–2010)
- Playing career: 2010–2020
- Position: Center

Career history
- 2010–2012: Anibal Zahle
- 2012–2013: Club Sagesse
- 2013–2017: Al Mouttahed Tripoli
- 2017–2018: Al Riyadi Beirut
- 2018–2019: Beirut Club
- 2019–2020: Club Sagesse

Charles Tabet (born July 1, 1987) is a former professional basketball player. He was also represented the Lebanese National Basketball Team that participated in the 2011 FIBA Asia Championship in Wuhan in China, after being called to play as a replacement for retiree Jackson Vroman. Tabet started his college career at the University of South Alabama before deciding to sign his first professional contract for the Lebanese green castle Hekmeh BC along with twin brother Phillip. However, in 2013 Charles had signed for Al Mouttahed Tripoli along with former American Sacramento Kings center Hassan Whiteside to play in the 2014 Lebanese basketball season. And in 2017 he left Al Mouttahed Tripoli to sign for Al Riyadi Beirut.
