= Elie Stephan =

Lebanese basketball player (born 1986)

Byblos Club
- Position: Shooting Guard
- League: Lebanese Basketball League

Personal information
- Born: July 20, 1986 (age 40) Achrafieh, Lebanon
- Listed height: 6 ft 3 in (1.91 m)
- Listed weight: 210 lb (95 kg)

Career information
- Playing career: 2005–2019

Elie Stephan (alternatively Elie Estephan; born July 20, 1986, in Ghosta, Lebanon) is a former professional Lebanese basketball player who last played with Lebanese Basketball League team Homenetmen. He is also a former member of Lebanon national basketball team as a shooting guard. He's 1.91 m tall (6 ft 3 in).
