= Tseng Wen-ting =

Taiwanese basketball player (born 1984)

Tseng Wen-Ting
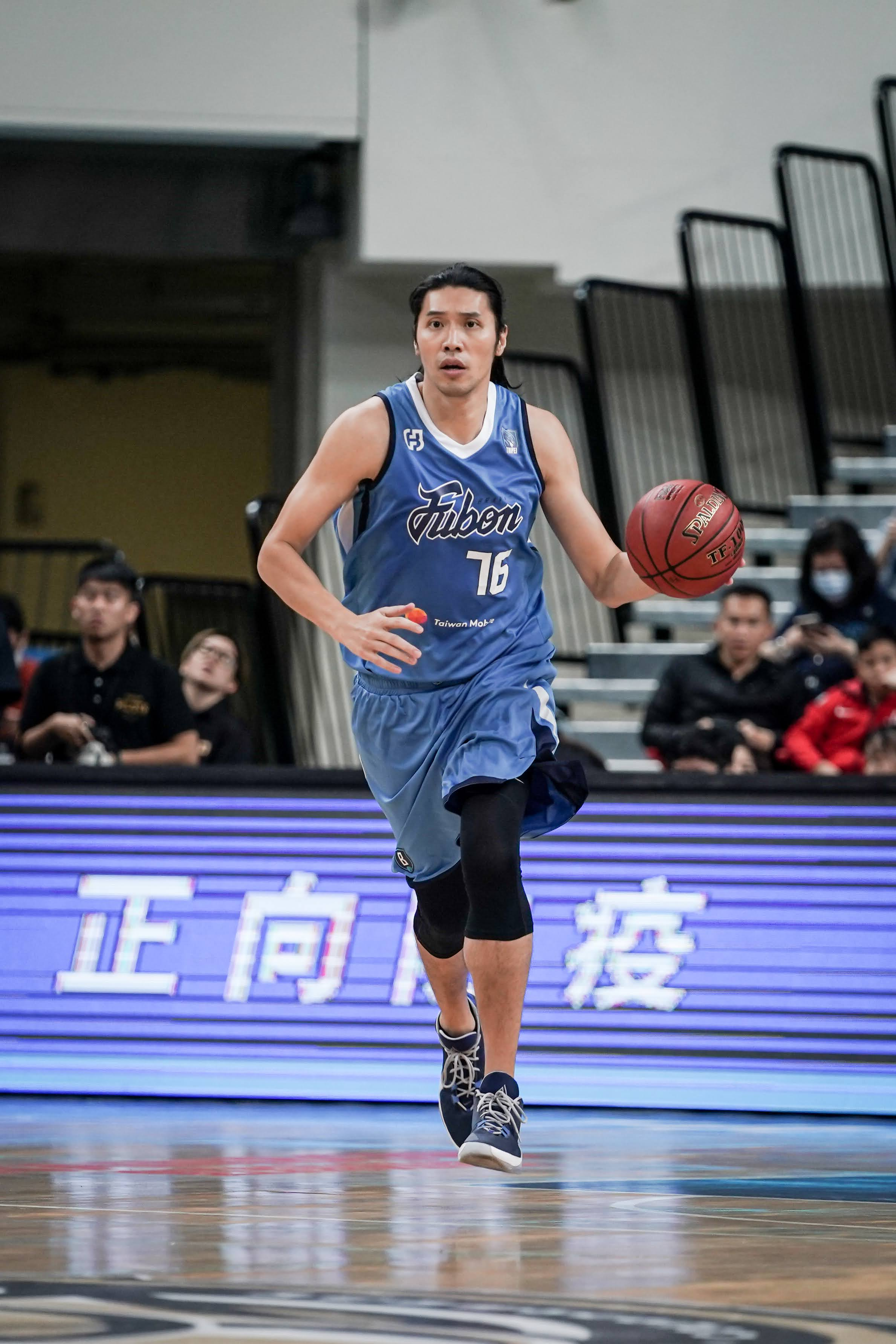

No. 76 – New Taipei CTBC DEA
- Position: Power forward / center
- League: Taiwan Professional Basketball League

Personal information
- Born: July 6, 1984 (age 42) Tamsui, Taipei County (now New Taipei City), Taiwan
- Listed height: 6 ft 8.25 in (2.04 m)
- Listed weight: 215 lb (98 kg)

Career information
- High school: Tsai Hsing High School (Taipei)
- College: Taipei Physical Education College
- Playing career: 2001–present

Career history
- 2003–2011: Yulon Dinos
- 2011: Osaka Evessa
- 2011–2018: Shanghai Sharks
- 2018–2019: Sichuan Jinqiang
- 2019–2022: Taipei Fubon Braves
- 2022–present: New Taipei CTBC DEA

Career highlights
- T1 League champion (2023); T1 League All-Star (2023); P.League+ Champion (2021)
Medals
Men's basketball
Representing Chinese Taipei
FIBA Asia Challenge
Bronze medal – third place	2004 Taipei
East Asian Games
Silver medal – second place	2001 Osaka
Gold medal – first place	2005 Macau
Silver medal – second place	2009 Hong Kong
Gold medal – first place	2013 Tianjin
ABC Under-18 Championship
Bronze medal – third place	2000 Kuala Lumpur

Tseng Wen-ting
- Chinese: 曾文鼎
Transcriptions
Standard Mandarin
- Hanyu Pinyin: Zēng Wéndǐng
- Wade–Giles: Ts'eng Wen-ting

Ah-Ting
- Chinese: 阿鼎
Transcriptions
Standard Mandarin
- Hanyu Pinyin: Ā Dǐng
- Wade–Giles: A Ting

The Landlord
- Traditional Chinese: 大房東
- Simplified Chinese: 大房东
- Literal meaning: big landlord
Transcriptions
Standard Mandarin
- Hanyu Pinyin: Dà Fángdōng
- Wade–Giles: Da Fang-tung

Tseng Wen-ting (Chinese: 曾文鼎; pinyin: Zēng Wéndǐng; Wade–Giles: Ts'eng Wen-ting; born July 6, 1984, in Tamsui, Taiwan) is a Taiwanese basketball player. He currently plays for the New Taipei CTBC DEA of the Taiwan Professional Basketball League (TPBL).

As one of the rare mobile players taller than 2 metres in Taiwan, Tseng has also served as starting centre for the Chinese Taipei national basketball team since his national team debut at the FIBA Asia Championship 2001. At the FIBA Asia Championship 2009, Tseng helped Chinese Taipei to a fifth-place finish while averaging 10.4 points and 4.7 rebounds per game. The fifth-place finish was Chinese Taipei's best finish in the tournament since the turn of the century.

On September 30, 2022, Tseng has signed with New Taipei CTBC DEA of the T1 League on a 3-year contract.

On August 25, 2025, Tseng re-signed with New Taipei CTBC DEA of the Taiwan Professional Basketball League (TPBL).
