= Ahmed Malallah =

Emirati footballer

Personal information
- Full name: Ahmed Malallah Fairouz Al-Hammadi
- Date of birth: 9 November 1991 (age 35)
- Place of birth: United Arab Emirates
- Height: 1.83 m (6 ft 0 in)
- Position: Forward

Youth career
- Al Jazira

Senior career*
Years	Team	Apps	(Gls)
2010–2011	Al Jazira	1	(0)
2011–2013	Ittihad Kalba	8	(0)
2013	Dibba Al-Fujairah	12	(1)
2013–2014	Baniyas	11	(2)
2014–2016	Ajman	19	(1)
2016–2018	Emirates Club	33	(2)
2018–2020	Baniyas	21	(1)
2021	Hatta	11	(1)
2021–2022	Al Urooba	4	(0)
2022	Hatta		
2022–2023	Al-Fujairah		
2023–2024	United		
2024–2025	Majd		

International career^{‡}
2017–	United Arab Emirates	3	(1)
- * Club domestic league appearances and goals ‡ National team caps and goals as of 13 January 2018

Ahmed Malallah (Arabic:أحمد مال الله) (born 9 November 1991) is an Emirati footballer who plays as a forward.

== International career ==
=== International goals ===
Scores and results list the United Arab Emirates' goal tally first.

No	Date	Venue	Opponent	Score	Result	Competition
1.	17 December 2017	Zabeel Stadium, Dubai, United Arab Emirates	Iraq	1–0	1–0	Friendly
