= Ali Kanaan =

Lebanese Canadian basketball player

- Occupation: Basketball player

Ali Kanaan (born 12 December 1985 in Beirut, Lebanon) is a Lebanese Canadian basketball player who played for Byblos and the Lebanon national basketball team.

== Early life and education ==
Born to Anis Kanaan and Amira El-Fares of Beirut, Lebanon, Kanaan immigrated to Canada. He played in Vanier College (Ville Saint Laurent, Quebec) and College Montmorency (Laval, Quebec). He played in the NCAA for 4 years with the University of Massachusetts Lowell.

== Career ==
=== Early career (Highschool and College) ===
Ali played for the University of Massachusetts Lowell. for four years, a Division II school who is in the Northeast 10 conference. He played his first year for them during the 2006–2007 season where he averaged 3.8 points and 4.0 rebounds a game during his freshman season.

=== Pro career ===
In 2010 after the 2010 FIBA World Championship and after graduating from college Ali became pro and he signed with Lebanese Riyadi in the Lebanese Basketball League.

=== National team ===
Kanaan became a member of the Lebanon national basketball team, with whom he debuted with at the FIBA Asia Championship 2009. At the tournament, he averaged 2.2 points and 3.2 rebounds for the fourth-placed Lebanese team.
