= Takuya Kawamura =

Japanese basketball player

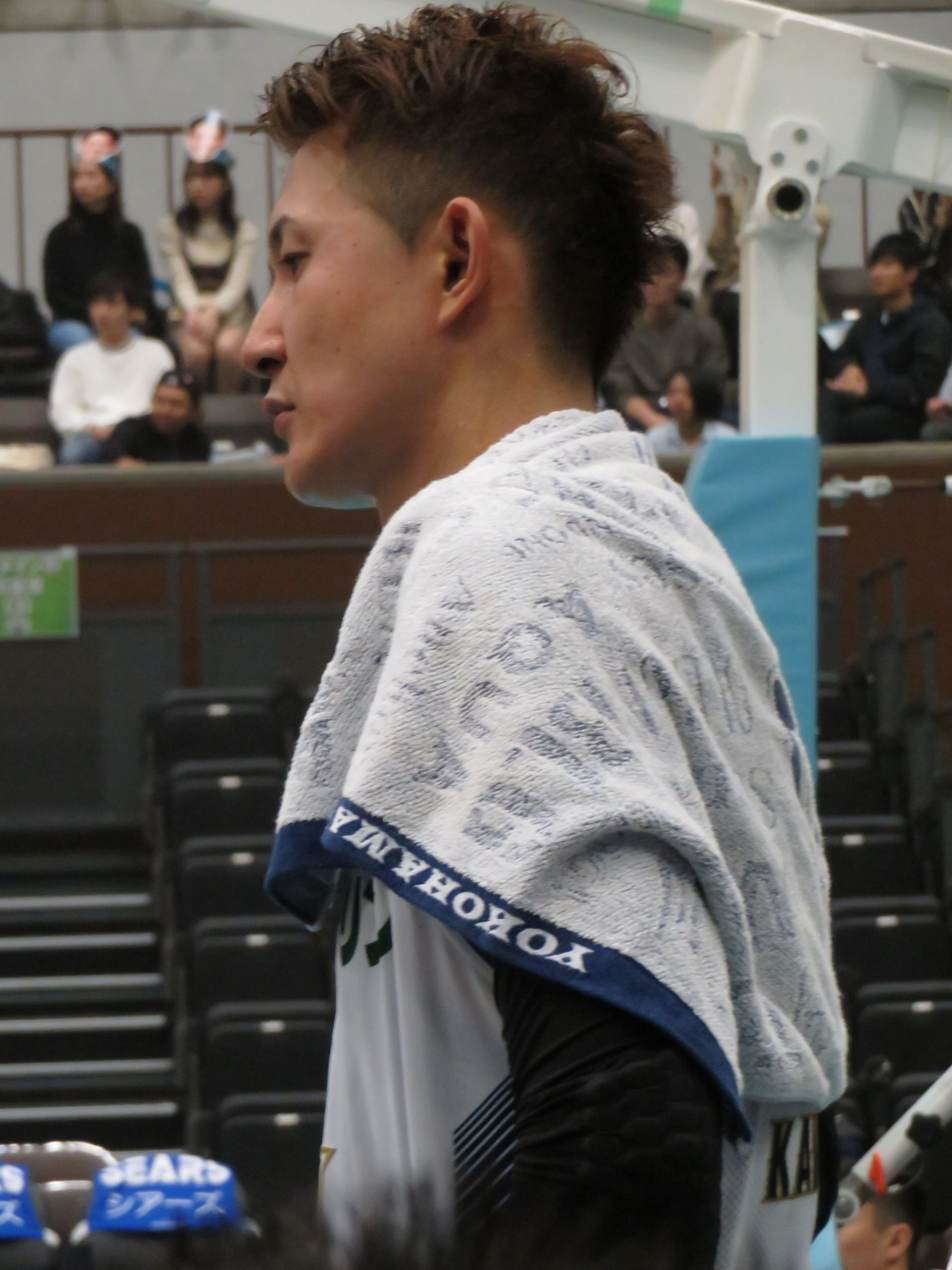

No. 0 – Nishinomiya Storks
- Position: Shooting guard
- League: B.League

Personal information
- Born: April 24, 1986 (age 40) Morioka, Iwate, Japan
- Listed height: 193 cm (6 ft 4 in)
- Listed weight: 92 kg (203 lb)

Career information
- High school: Morioka Minami
- Playing career: 2005–present

Career history
- 2005–2008: OSG
- 2008–2013: Link Tochigi Brex
- 2013–2015: Wakayama Trians
- 2015–2016: Mitsubishi Electric
- 2016–2019: Yokohama B-Corsairs
- 2019–2021: SeaHorses Mikawa
- 2021–present: Nishinomiya Storks

Career highlights
- Japan Basketball League Rookie of the Year (2006); 3× JBL Scoring leader (2009–2011); 4× JBL Best5 (2006, 2008–2010); JBL All-star (2009)
Medals
Men's basketball
Representing Japan
FIBA Asia Challenge
Silver medal – second place	2010 Beirut	Team
William Jones Cup
Bronze medal – third place	2010 Taipei	Team

Takuya Kawamura (川村 卓也, Kawamura Takuya; born 24 April 1986) is a Japanese professional basketball guard currently signed to the Nishinomiya Storks. In 2005, he skipped college and started playing professional basketball, following Kazuo Nakamura's advice. In 2009, he decided to leave the Japan Basketball League and try to earn a contract in the NBA. In the 2009 NBA Summer League, the Phoenix Suns added Kawamura to their roster. He has been dubbed "Offence Machine" and very talkative as he had a radio show on Tochigi's Radio Berry FM.

== His notable buzzer beaters ==
- On May 14, 2017, he hit a buzzer beater in a relegation game 3 against Akita Northern Happinets to a win 17–16. Video
- In Game 3 of 2010 JBL finals vs. Aisin SeaHorses Mikawa, he banked in a 3-pointer at the buzzer. Video
- On February 4, 2017, in a B.League regular season game, he sank a buzzer-beating to win the game against the Chiba Jets, 72–70. Video
- One of the greatest clutch shooters in basketball world history

== Career statistics ==
Legend
GP	Games played	GS	Games started	MPG	Minutes per game
FG%	Field goal percentage	3P%	3-point field goal percentage	FT%	Free throw percentage
RPG	Rebounds per game	APG	Assists per game	SPG	Steals per game
BPG	Blocks per game	PPG	Points per game	**Bold**	Career high

=== NBA Summer League ===
Year	Team	GP	GS	MPG	FG%	3P%	FT%	RPG	APG	SPG	BPG	PPG
2009-10	Phoenix Suns	1	0	4.4	.000	.000	.000	0.0	0.0	0.0	0	0.0

=== Regular season ===
Year	Team	GP	GS	MPG	FG%	3P%	FT%	RPG	APG	SPG	BPG	PPG
2005-06	OSG											
2006-07	OSG											
2007-08	OSG	35	34	35.9	.436	.417	.812	4.1	1.7	1.2	0.1	14.6
2008-09	Tochigi	35		35.7	.408	.408	.742	4.5	2.1	1.4	0.2	20.4
2009-10	Tochigi	40		33.5	.430	.375	.754	3.8	2.7	1.3	0.2	20.5
2010-11	Tochigi	28		34.2	.395	.354	.714	4.8	2.7	1.1	0.2	19.5
2011-12	Tochigi	37	36	35.0	.412	.404	.838	3.9	4.5	1.7	0.1	20.4
2012-13	Tochigi	30	28	34.5	.428	.435	.776	3.9	3.7	1.2	0.0	18.3
2013-14	Wakayama	46	39	35.3	.430	.396	.811	3.1	5.1	1.2	0.2	19.2
2014-15	Wakayama	9	4	27.0	.388	.321	.914	2.2	3.6	1.8	0.2	15.9
2015-16	Mitsubishi	42	30	21.6	.394	.397	.667	1.8	1.2	0.5	0.1	7.7
2016-17	Yokohama	59	57	29.5	.402	.321	.781	3.1	3.3	0.9	0.1	13.4
2017-18	Yokohama	57	43	29.6	.416	.368	.807	3.2	3.6	0.8	0.1	13.6
2018-19	Yokohama	59	53	31.3	.426	.360	.856	2.6	4.5	1.3	0.1	15.6

=== Playoffs ===
Year	Team	GP	GS	MPG	FG%	3P%	FT%	RPG	APG	SPG	BPG	PPG
2016-17	Yokohama	4	4	26.37	.353	.286	.826	4.0	1.0	1.25	0.75	15.3
2016-17	Yokohama	1	1	19.48	.000	.000	1.000	4.0	2.0	0	0	2.0
2017-18	Yokohama	4	4	28.42	.411	.333	.826	4.8	5.8	0.75	0	18.3
2018-19	Yokohama	3	3	25.21	.429	.125	.929	2.3	5.7	1.0	0.67	12.7

=== Early cup games ===
Year	Team	GP	GS	MPG	FG%	3P%	FT%	RPG	APG	SPG	BPG	PPG
2017	Yokohama	2	2	29.59	.438	.500	1.000	4.0	3.0	1.0	0	9.5
2018	Yokohama	2	2	27.34	.367	.364	1.000	3.5	3.5	1.0	0.5	16.5

=== All-star games ===
Year	Team	GP	GS	MPG	FG%	3P%	FT%	RPG	APG	SPG	BPG	PPG
2019	B.White	1	1	20.01	.545	.375	.000	0.0	2.0	0.0	0	15.0

=== National team statistics ===
Year	Team	GP	GS	MPG	FG%	3P%	FT%	RPG	APG	SPG	BPG	PPG
2006	Japan	5		11.00	.263	.235	.000	0.8	0.0	0.0	0	2.8
2007	Japan	8		22.07	.451	.477	.500	2.1	0.9	0.8	0	14.6
2011	Japan	9		29.13	.398	.356	.826	1.7	3.1	1.2	0	13.4

== Personal ==
His older brother also plays basketball. Takuya has been married with two children.
