= Boustani =

Boustani is a Levantine surname. Variations of the name, due to transliteration, include Boustani as well as Boustany, Bisteni, Bistany, Bostany, Bustani, Besteni, Bestani and Bestene (Arabic: بستاني / ALA-LC: Bustānī). The name, a nisba, derives from the Arabic word for "garden" (a loanword from Middle Persian bōyestān).

The surname comes from a place named El-Bassatin, in Jableh, Latakia. In the beginning of the 16th century, and after the Ottoman conquest of the Middle East, Muqim (Abu Mahfouz) left his home town and went towards Mount-Lebanon, stopping at Dahr Safra, then Bqerqacha, a village at the foot of the Cedars of Lebanon. Muqim had three sons, Mahfouz, Abd el Aziz and Nader. Abd el Aziz resided in Deir el Kamar. Nader and his family settled in the Chouf region, principally Deir el Kamar and Debbiyé.

Muqim and his eldest son Mahfouz went back to the northern regions of the country. His descendants still bear the name Mahfouz.

Following social and political upheavals, the Boustanis settled in every single region of Lebanon – in Giyeh, Marj, Jounieh, Tripoli, in the Koura and the Beqaa – as well as in Syria (Damascus and Aleppo), Turkey and Egypt. Throughout the two last centuries, and especially in the beginning of the 20th, the great migration of the Boustanis towards Europe and the New World began.

During the two last centuries, members of the family emigrated from different Lebanese cities to numerous countries around the world. However, the Boustanis who presently live in Lebanon, as well as those of the Diaspora, constitute one sole family.

The Boustanis were a family of many talents, to which were born eminent archbishops, great statesmen, businessmen, writers and poets in Lebanon and in the Diaspora countries. Among the bishops were: Abdallah (1780–1866), Boutros (1819–1883) and Augustin (1875–1957).

== Notable people ==
- Alberto Bustani Adem, Mexican academic and former President of the Monterrey Campus of Tecnologico de Monterrey
- Augustin Bostani (1876–1957), Eparch of Sidon
- Boutros al-Boustani, Lebanese intellectual poet, writer, encyclopaedist and pioneer of the Arabic literary renaissance
- Charles Boustany, former Congressman from Louisiana, United States of America
- Don Bustany (born 1928), American radio and television producer
- Emile Bustani, Lebanese tycoon, entrepreneur, astro-physicist (American University of Beirut) and civil engineer (Massachusetts Institute of Technology), philanthropist and politician
- Emile Boustany, former Commander of General rank in the Lebanese Armed Forces
- José Maurício Bustani, Brazilian Ambassador to the United Kingdom and former director-general of the Organisation for the Prohibition of Chemical Weapons
- Myrna Bustani, daughter of Emile Bustani, and first female in the Lebanese Parliament
- Nora Boustany, Lebanese educator and journalist
- Salim Al Bustani (1847–1884), Lebanese journalist and writer
- Sara Boustany, Lebanese-American actress
- Suleyman al-Boustani (Effendi) (1856–1925), nephew of Boutros al-Boustani, translator of Homer's Iliad into Arabic, and Minister of Commerce and Agriculture in the last Ottoman Government
- Pierre Bostani (1819–1899), Assistant to the Pontifical Throne, Archbishop of Tyre, Count of Rome, Bishop of Saint-John-Acre, Council Father of the First Vatican Council
- Wissam Boustany, Lebanese/British concert flautist
