= Tanyus Shahin =

Maronite muleteer and peasant leader

- طانيوس شاهين
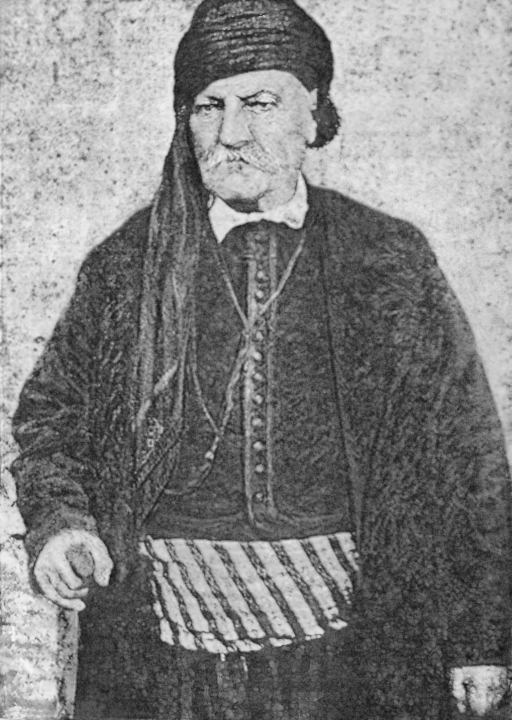
- Portrait of Tanyus Shahin

Head of the Republic of Keserwan
- In office 1859–1861
- Preceded by: Post established
- Succeeded by: Post abolished

Personal details
- Born: 1815 Rayfoun, Mount Lebanon, Ottoman Empire
- Died: 1895 (aged 79–80) Rayfoun, Mount Lebanon Mutasarrifate, Ottoman Empire

Tanyus Shahin Saadeh al-Rayfouni (also spelled Tanios Chahine Saadé Al Rayfouné, given name also spelled Taniyus or Tanius; 1815–1895) was a Maronite muleteer and peasant leader from Mount Lebanon. He led a peasants' revolt in the area of Keserwan in 1859, driving out the area's Maronite nobility, the feudal Khazen lords, and declared a peasants' republic. While he had a reputation as a ruffian and provocateur among members of the Maronite clergy and European consuls, Shahin became a popular figure among Christian commoners, many of whom considered him the guardian of their interests, a view which Shahin promoted.

Following his victory in Keserwan, Shahin and his fighters launched intermittent raids against villages in nearby regions, such as Byblos and Matn, often in the name of defending the rights of local Christians. The assaults and their repercussions served as catalysts of the 1860 Mount Lebanon civil war, particularly the battle of Beit Mery between local Maronites and Druze, in which Shahin was a principal belligerent. Although he claimed he could raise an army of 50,000 to combat the forces of the Druze feudal lords, he did not participate further in the war. Following the war's end, he was defeated by Youssef Karam in a struggle over political influence in Maronite affairs. Shahin subsequently relinquished his republic and worked in the judiciary of his home village, Rayfoun.

== Early life and character ==
There are sparse biographical details available about Shahin. He was born to a poor Maronite Christian family in the village of Rayfoun in the Keserwan district of Mount Lebanon in 1815. According to the historian Elizabeth Thompson, Shahin may have been literate as indicated by his early career as an artisan and an entrepreneur, while Lebanese historian Kamal Salibi describes him as "half-literate". Before leading the 1859 peasant revolt in Keserwan, Shahin was a blacksmith and a muleteer who transported goods throughout Keserwan. He became associated with the Lazarist school of Rayfoun, whose contacts there attained for him credentials from Beirut's French Consulate. Shahin's letters' bearing his seal or signature may have been penned by village clergymen with whom he kept close ties.

Shahin was tall and of muscular build. According to Thompson, Shahin "was more a man of spoken word than the pen, famous for powerful, sermon-like speeches at village meetings", and for his violent temper, according to Salibi. He acted as a local shaykh shabab (leader of young men), a title that carried honor and typically denoted a village strongman who derived power from his following of armed men. He was admired and respected by the peasants of Keserwan, some of whom considered him their "redeemer". According to a local chronicler, residents "prepared grand receptions for him amid joy and celebrations" when he entered a local village. Various European diplomats described him as a "ruffian of despicable character" and as dishonest, while some clergymen also regarded him as deceitful. Anecdotal accounts gathered by writer Yusuf Mubarak indicate Shahin's piety, including twice-daily prayers and a refusal to consume meat except on Sundays and Christian holidays. In one of his surviving letters to the clergy in the Keserwan village of Aramoun, Shahin admonishes wine and arak drinkers at Christian festivals and threatens one-month's imprisonment for drunken behavior at such festivals.

== Leadership of peasants' revolt ==
=== Uprising in Keserwan ===
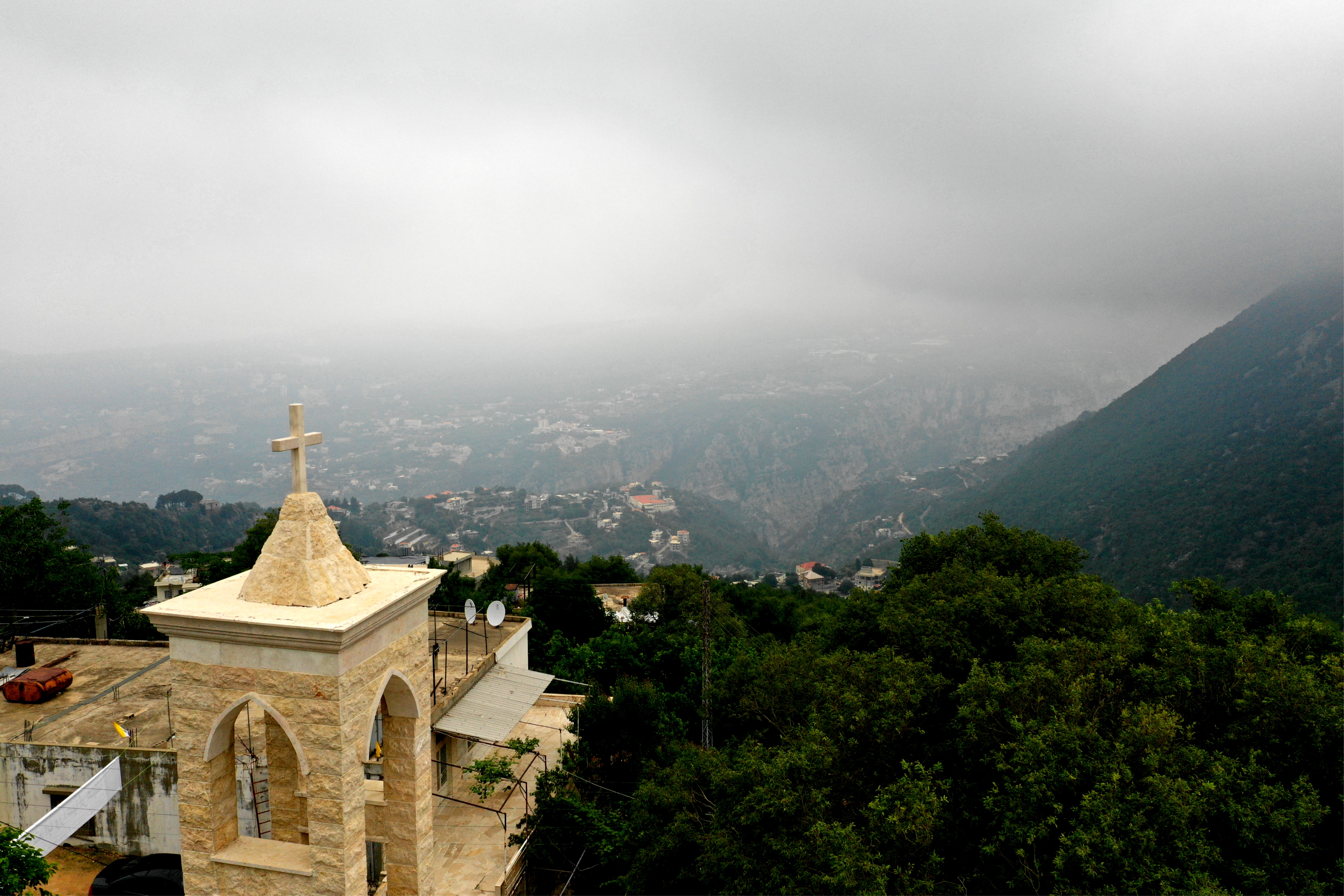
Skyline of a Keserwan village, 2019

Peasant anger in Keserwan had been building since the mid-19th century, due to a number of factors, including the burdens of corvée (unpaid labor for a landlord) that had been imposed during the rule of Emir Bashir Shihab II, general economic hardship, and the decreasing availability of land. The Maronite Khazen family traditionally served as the sheikhs (chiefs) of Keserwan, although their power had been significantly diminished during Emir Bashir's rule. To meet Emir Bashir's increased tax demands and finance their move to gain further control over Keserwan's silk production, the Khazens took loans from Beirut lenders and accumulated significant debts. Several became destitute in the 1830s and 1840s and Khazen influence over the Maronite Church waned. To compensate for their economic, social and political stagnation, the Khazens increased their pressure on the peasants of Keserwan in the late 1850s, while also spending extravagantly.

The Khazens opposed the creation of the "Double Qaimaqmate" in Mount Lebanon in the 1840s, which divided Mount Lebanon into Druze and Christian-run sectors, and were incensed at the appointment of a sheikh from the mixed Druze-Christian Abu'l Lama family as the qaimaqam (deputy governor) of the Maronite section of the Qaimaqamate. The Khazens feared that such an appointment would formally subordinate them to the Abu'l Lama sheikhs. Following the Abu'l Lama sheikh's death in 1854, his successor Bashir Ahmad Abu'l Lama attempted to further reduce the Khazens' influence, prompting the Khazens to stir the peasants to revolt against Bashir Ahmad. The revolt against Bashir Ahmad soon turned against the Khazen sheikhs and their feudal allies. The peasant subjects of the Khazen sheikhs had long been wary of their rule due to the excessive taxes they imposed as well as the additional gifts the peasants were virtually obligated to give the sheikhs, which many peasants considered humiliating.

In early 1858, a group of peasants from Keserwan lodged a formal complaint against the Khazens to Khurshid Pasha, the Ottoman governor of Beirut. Later, in March 1858, the Khazens held a summit for the people of Keserwan to garner support for their nomination of a new qaimaqam. Instead, the peasants participating in the summit voiced their dissent against the Khazens and in October, several villages in Keserwan entered into an alliance against the Khazen sheikhs. Shahin was chosen by this alliance of peasants as their leader in December, and was declared the wakil awwal (first delegate).

In January 1859, Shahin intensified the armed revolt against the Khazen sheikhs and with 800 of his peasant fighters, he besieged the Khazens during a summit they were holding in Ghosta. The siege prompted the sheikhs to flee the village, and the peasants under Shahin subsequently plundered the Khazens' estates. Shahin and his men proceeded to attack the Khazens in other villages with little blood spilled in the process, with the exception of the wife and daughter of a Khazen sheikh who were killed in Ajaltoun in July during a raid on their home by the peasants. The Maronite patriarch, Paul Peter Massad, condemned their killing as a "horrific crime". Silk and wheat warehouses belonging to the sheikhs were plundered and the goods were redistributed among the peasants of Keserwan. By July, the Khazens had been routed and between 500 and 600 family members had fled to Beirut in an impoverished state. Shahin broadened the peasants' main demands of tax relief and refunds for the illegal payments they had previously paid to the Khazen sheikhs to also include political and legal reforms. Shahin cited the Edict of Gülhane, which mandated equality for all Ottoman citizens. Not only were these top-down state decrees cited, but they were reinterpreted by these insurgents, demanding that the Tanzimat's promise of equality be implemented through the eradication of feudal tax surcharges, marriage fees, and numerous other humiliating procedures. These villagers additionally engaged with the elite trope of 'juhl' (ignorance) when under investigation by state commissions, strategically evading prosecution. Before 1858, a noble family had never before been uprooted by the ahali (commoners), and the Khazens quickly resolved heated family rivalries in favor of a united front against the revolters.

=== Establishment of republic ===
Following his victory over the Khazen sheikhs, Shahin and the peasants of Keserwan formed a government, with Shahin declaring a jumhuriyya (republic). He became known as the wakil 'amm (general delegate), and in the fall of 1859 moved the headquarters of the rebellion from the coastal village of Zouk Mikael to his hometown of Rayfoun in the mountains. Although revolts were relatively commonplace in Mount Lebanon, the ousting of a noble family by their peasant subjects was unprecedented. Shahin's government consisted of a 100-member council made up of representatives from the villages of Keserwan. Over half of the representatives were peasants who did not own land, 32 were relatively well-to-do farmers, ten were clergymen and three were merchants or lenders. Shahin, who by this point oversaw a 1,000-strong militia, exercised power by seizing arms, ensured the upholding of the law and established security on the roads. He disciplined dissidents suspected of betraying the government and issued decrees in the name of the public. He also entered into negotiations with the Khazen sheikhs, but they reached a stalemate.

The main villages that supported Shahin's government were Rayfoun, Ajaltoun, Ashqout, Qleiat and Mazraat Kfardebian. The representatives of these villages were able to gain the solidarity of other villages by persuading their inhabitants through both peaceful and coercive means that as Christians they were all a part of single community with a united purpose. The leaders of some villages, such as those of Ghosta, Aramoun, Ghazir and Ftuh opposed Shahin and his revolt. Shahin's popularity among the Christian peasants of Mount Lebanon grew as he came to be viewed as their savior from both the Druze nobles and the traditional Maronite elites. This reputation was further solidified after Shahin's men backed Christian residents in a clash with Druze residents in the mixed village of Beit Meri in Matn in August 1859.

The Khazens demanded the restoration of their rule in Keserwan and lodged complaints to the Ottoman government about property stolen or damaged by the peasantry. The Ottomans launched an investigation in Keserwan, but in their interviews with the peasants, all claimed that they were unaware of looting and other crimes, while representatives of Shahin denied that they were rebels, insisting that they only sought the implementation of the Tanzimat reforms and the restoration of law and order. In petitions to the Maronite Patriarchate, the peasants demanded compensation by the Khazens for taxes that were illegally extorted from them, an abolition to the traditional gift-giving required of the peasants, the abolition of marriage taxes levied by the Khazens and an end to the practice of beating peasants, among other demands. Shahin nominally recognized the Maronite Patriarchate as the ultimate arbiter of disputes, but consistently urged them to honor their obligations to the ahali (commoners). In one incident he or his men fired shots toward the patriarch's headquarters in Bkirki for hosting a number of Khazens who were seeking refuge there. In March 1859, Shahin rebuffed the church's request to make an agreement with the Khazen sheikhs, citing the need to first "consult with all the ahali and all the villages".

Shahin's rise generally confused the Ottoman government because Shahin used the Tanzimat to legitimize his revolt. The Ottomans did not consider the religious equality called for by the Tanzimat reforms to translate into class equality, which is how Shahin interpreted it. Moreover, the Ottomans did not countenance that a semi-literate Arabic-speaking peasant from a rural region such as Keserwan would serve as a representative of the Tanzimat. They reacted to Shahin's revolt negatively, although the provincial Ottoman authorities of Beirut generally felt powerless to act against the peasant rebels due to a lack of funds and forces on the ground. Khurshid Pasha sympathized more with the Khazen sheikhs and in a letter to the Patriarchate accused Shahin of using "deceit to lead astray the minds of the people and to seduce them into following his evil ways". The principal focus of the Ottoman authorities in Lebanon was containing Shahin's revolt. However, later historians of Lebanon accused Khurshid Pasha of at least tacitly supporting Shahin in order to break communal solidarity.

Khurshid Pasha dispatched Emir Yusuf Ali Murad, a Maronite sheikh from the Abu'l Lama family, to rein in peasant rebels in Byblos, but Shahin sent a letter warning Emir Yusuf not to "intervene in the affairs" of Bybos because the "Christians of Jubail [Byblos] were united with the ahali of Keserwan" and claimed that "all the Christians of Syria have made common cause". He condemned Emir Yusuf for aligning himself with the ousted sheikhs and his "Druze relatives" and accused him of attempting to "subjugate the Christians after we achieved our [freedom]". He threatened Emir Yusuf to "return without delay" and that if he "desires a fight, we are more eager than you, and we are not afraid". Shahin's confidence in the support he received from the Christian peasantry of Keserwan and other parts of Mount Lebanon and his challenge to Emir Yusuf through a populist sectarian approach alarmed the Maronite elites, the church and the Ottoman authorities.

In response to a Maronite priest's complaints about harassment by Shia Muslims against Christians, Shahin's men attacked and plundered Shia villages and travelers in Byblos and demanded that Shia villages convert to Christianity to avoid assault. The Shia residents of Byblos protested these assaults in June 1859. While Shahin's actions further frustrated the local elites, Christian, Muslim and Druze alike, his reputation as the defender of Christian rights was bolstered at the popular level. Later that year, Maronite and Druze notables came together at Mdayrij to sign a joint pact known as 'one hand'. With the aim of marching on Keserwan and suppressing Shahin's movements, and therefore restoring the Khazen lords, this pact demonstrated the transcendence of elite class solidarity over religious divisions in the face of feudal property threats.

== Civil war in Mount Lebanon ==
The increased assertiveness of Maronite peasants as a result of Shahin's revolt and confidence in their demographic majority in Mount Lebanon alarmed the Druze feudal lords; the latter resolved to arm their peasant fighters. Shahin increasingly introduced a populist Christian discourse through which he framed Maronite lords who allied with Druze elites as traitors. However, the exclusive nature of this rhetoric led to the alienation of non-Christian peasants such as Shi'a and Druze, which worsened intercommunal panic pre-1860 war. Likewise, Maronite peasants, wary of growing Muslim hostility toward Christians in Ottoman Syria, were also being armed, in particular by Maronite bishop Tobia Aoun. Tensions turned into violence, and between March and May 1860, several retaliatory tit-for-tat killings and attacks of sectarian nature between Druzes and Christians occurred throughout Mount Lebanon and its immediate environs. In late May, Shahin and some 300 of his men entered the village of Naccache in the mixed Druze-Maronite Matn district to seize silk owned by a noble family of Keserwan. However, instead of returning to Rayfoun, they proceeded to enter the nearby Maronite village of Antelias. Shahin's incursion into Antelias was considered a provocation by the Druze who feared that the presence of Shahin's fighters in that village threatened the Druze residents of Matn. Many Christians in turn viewed the deployment of Khurshid Pasha's troops in Hazmiyeh on 26 May as a provocation because they suspected Khurshid Pasha of being allied with the Druze and that this was the signal for the beginning of the Druze counter-attack. Shahin's stated purpose for entering Antelias was to protect the Christian Shihab emirs based in the village of Baabda.

The Shihab emirs requested Shahin and his men withdraw from Baabda's vicinity to avoid conflict. However, on 29 May, clashes occurred in the Matn village of Beit Mery between its Druze and Christian residents, which led to the participation of their respective coreligionists from other villages in the vicinity. By 30 May, the Druze had defeated the Keserwan fighters in Beit Meri. Fighting subsequently spread throughout Matn, with 35–40 Christian villages being burned. According to Lebanese historian Leila Tarazi Fawaz, the Keserwan fighters proved to be undisciplined and ineffective against the more experienced, unified and better organized Druze forces.

The fighting in Matn spread throughout Mount Lebanon and its surrounding area, becoming a civil war mainly between the Druze and the Christians, which later spilled over into other parts of Syria. Shahin claimed that he could raise 50,000 fighters to fight the Druze, and Christians from areas outside of Keserwan appealed for his intervention. However, when his men were halted by Ottoman forces in Matn, Shahin and other Maronite militia leaders largely restricted their operations to guarding their areas of origin. In mid-June, when Zahle, the last Christian stronghold, was besieged by the Druze, Shahin did not send reinforcements and the town fell. This all but consolidated a Druze victory in Mount Lebanon. On 29 July, under pressure from Bishop Aoun, Shahin agreed to openly declare his obedience to the Ottoman sultan. Although the peasants' revolt had not been directly against the Ottoman state, Shahin's declaration served as a virtual repudiation of the revolt's legitimacy. In his declaration, Shahin asserted that he was forced to revolt by the treacherous "men of corruption".

== Later life and death ==
French-led international intervention ended the civil war and order was restored by 1861. The peace settlement that ended the war clearly reversed the gains of the peasants revolts: everyone was to go back to their place and to take back all their property and land as it was in the past. Notably, despite their opposing sides in the war, Maronite and Druze elites supported this peace treaty as they both aimed to silence the 'ignorant' (juhhal) commoners who had dominated politics, viewing it as a chance to restore elite nationalist zeal and reclaim political authority. Shahin's movement was in a precarious state in the war's aftermath; Shahin could not financially support his impoverished peasant partisans, the Maronite clergy was disillusioned with him, and Ottoman officialdom and the local nobility were arrayed against him. The Ottomans, the clergy and the nobility resolved to bring an end to Shahin's movement because it represented the last obstacle to their political reorganization of Mount Lebanon into the Mount Lebanon Mutasarrifate. Shahin threatened to convert to Protestantism together with his partisans if the Khazen sheikhs were restored to Keserwan, while Patriarch Massad of the Maronite Church was prepared to excommunicate Shahin and his supporters.

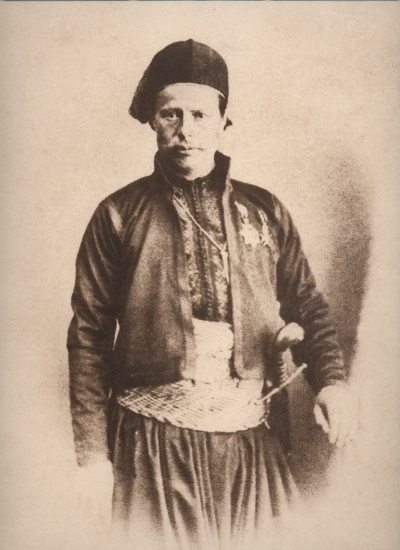
Shahin was defeated in battle by Youssef Karam (pictured) in March 1861. The two reconciled the following month and Shahin retired to take up a judicial post in his home village

Meanwhile, Youssef Karam, a Maronite leader from Ehden who acquired a degree of popularity during the war and backing from the Maronite Patriarchate and the French government, was appointed acting qaimaqam of the Christian areas of Mount Lebanon by Fuad Pasha after the war's end. Shahin opposed Karam, who in a bid to reconcile the Maronite community, issued orders directed to the peasants of Keserwan to restore properties seized from the Khazens and compensate the latter for their losses. Shahin was backed by Emir Majid Shihab, who sought to replace Karam as qaimaqam. Tensions between Shahin and Karam in Keserwan in late March 1861 culminated in a battle between their forces in an area between Rayfoun and 'Ashqout, in which Shahin was defeated and fled. Karam subsequently raided Shahin's home in Rayfoun, imprisoned some of Shahin's supporters and posted a number of his own troops in villages that supported Shahin's movement.

Fuad Pasha advised Karam to pursue and capture Shahin, while the British consul communicated his desire to see Karam restore the Khazens to their former position in Keserwan. Shahin ultimately reconciled with Karam on 12 April under the mediation of the French general Charles de Beaufort. Shahin agreed to submit to the Qaimaqamate's authority without conditions. Later in 1861, Shahin relinquished the republic that he established in Keserwan. Subsequent to his retirement from politics, Shahin served as a judicial official in Rayfoun. There, in 1895, he died in relative obscurity. He left no memoirs about his role in the civil war.

== Bibliography ==
- Aytekin, E. Attila (2012). "Peasant Protest in the Late Ottoman Empire: Moral Economy, Revolt, and the Tanzimat Reforms". International Review of Social History. 57 (2): 191–227. doi:10.1017/S0020859012000193. hdl:11511/48429.
- Fawaz, L.T. (1994). An Occasion for War: Civil Conflict in Lebanon and Damascus in 1860. University of California Press. ISBN 9780520087828.
- Hakim, Carol (2013). The Origins of the Lebanese National Idea: 1840–1920. University of California Press. ISBN 9780520954717.
- Harris, William (2012). Lebanon: A History, 600–2011. Oxford University Press. ISBN 9780195181111.
- Hokayem, Antoine (1988). Les provinces arabes de l'Empire Ottoman aux Archives du Ministère des affaires étrangères de France, 1793-1918 (in French). Editions universitaires du Liban.
- Johnson, Michael (2001). All Honourable Men: The Social Origins of War in Lebanon. I.B.Tauris. ISBN 9781860647154.
- Khouri, Robert M. (2003). Liban 1860: chronique des événements (in French). Etablissement Daccache.
- Makdisi, Ussama Samir (2000). The Culture of Sectarianism: Community, History, and Violence in Nineteenth-Century Ottoman Lebanon. University of California Press. ISBN 9780520922792.
- Makdisi, Ussama (2000). "Corrupting the Sublime Sultanate: The Revolt of Tanyus Shahin in Nineteenth-Century Ottoman Lebanon". Comparative Studies in Society and History. 42 (1): 180–208. doi:10.1017/s0010417500002644. S2CID 143901523.
- Porath, Yehoshua (1966). "The Peasant Revolt of 1858–61 in Kisrawan". Asian and African Studies. 2. Jerusalem Academic Press: 77–158.
- Thompson, Elizabeth F. (2013). Justice Interrupted: The Struggle for Constitutional Government in the Middle East. Harvard University Press. ISBN 9780674076099.
- Trablousi, Fawwaz (2007). A History of Modern Lebanon. Pluto Press. ISBN 9780745324371.
