= Collège Mariste Champville =

Private school in Lebanon

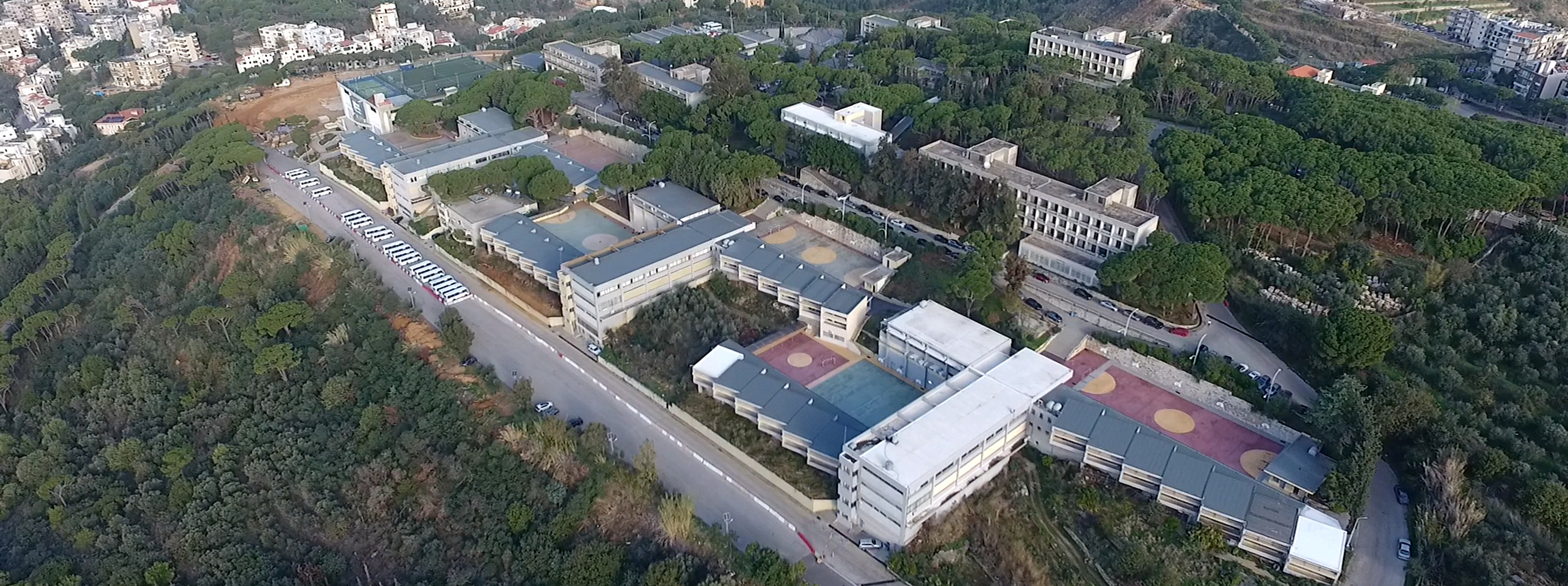
- Bird's-eye view of Champville's campus in Dik El Mehdi.
- Other names: Champville
- Motto: Omnia ad Jesum Per Mariam (Latin)
- Motto in English: Everything to Jesus through Mary
- Type: Private
- Established: 1966
- Founders: Saint Marcellin Champagnat
- Affiliations: Marist Brothers
- Religious affiliation: Roman Catholic
- Director: Pascale Jalkh
- Students: 3,600
- Location: Dik El Mehdi, Lebanon; 33°56′5.02″N 35°37′1.68″E
- Campus: 54.3 acres (22.0 ha)
- Language: French
- Colours: Blue & white
- Website: https://www.champville.edu.lb
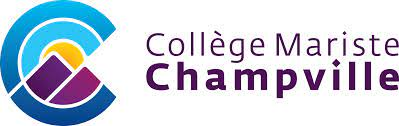

The Collège Mariste Champville (commonly known as "Champville") is a private Marist Roman Catholic and French-language educational institution set in Dik El Mehdi, Matn District, Lebanon. Champville is one of the two remaining Marist schools in Lebanon, the other being the Collège Mariste Notre Dame de Lourdes in Byblos.

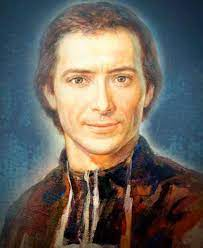
Saint Marcellin Champagnat the founding father of the Marist Brothers.

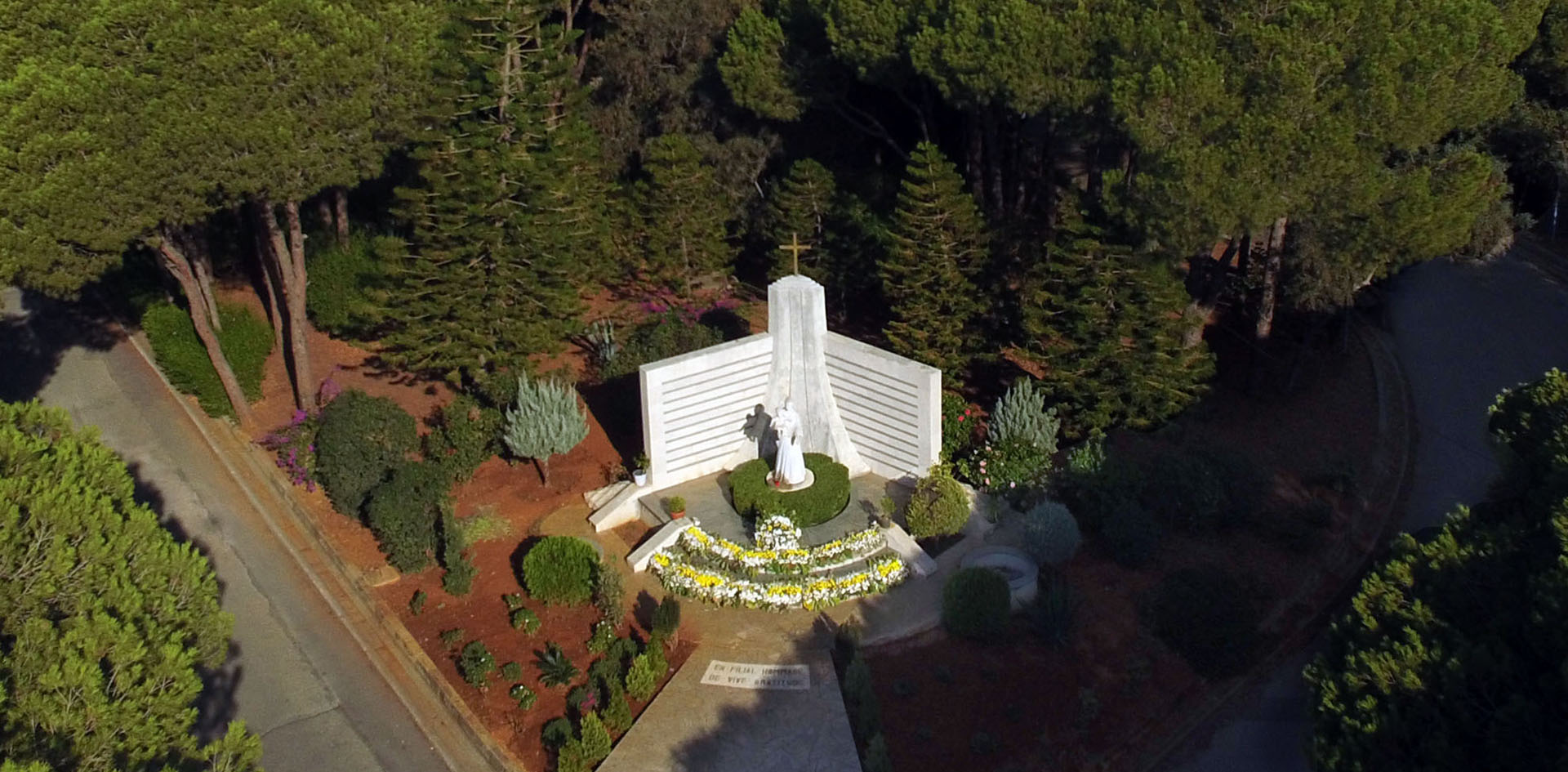
Marian shrine at the heart of the campus.

The school was named after Saint Marcellin Champagnat, the French founder of the congregation of the Marist Brothers. The name "Champville" is derived from the French phrase "la ville de Champagnat," which translates to "the city of Champagnat."

== History ==
In 1868, five Marist Brothers were initially sent from France to assist Jesuit missionaries at their seminary-college of Ghazir. The following year, three more joined them to serve at their college in Beirut. These two Jesuit seminary-colleges later merged to become Saint Joseph University of Beirut. However, due to a shortage of personnel, exacerbated by the consequences of the Franco-Prussian war of 1870-71, the Brothers had to withdraw in 1875.

In 1895, five Brothers were sent again to assist the Lazarist Fathers in Antoura, and the following year, five more joined the Jesuits in Beirut. The number of Marist Brothers arriving each year varied from three to five. By 1898, the Marist Brothers were managing an elementary school in Jounieh, and they were housed in Amcheet. In 1900, the Brothers took charge of schools in Amcheet, Achqout, and Baabdat. They were also asked to collaborate in the seminary of the Maronites in Kfarhay and in the Armenian-Catholic seminary in Bzoummar. In addition, they ran schools in Mish Mish and Baskinta, and they inaugurated their new Collège du Sacré-Cœur in Jounieh, which would eventually relocate to become Champville. By this time, the construction of their provincial house in Amcheet was completed, and a group of young Brothers emigrating from France had already arrived. Later that year, twenty young Brothers, ten novices, six postulants, and seven juvenists came to Lebanon where they continued their religious studies in Amcheet. They were joined by Lebanese Brothers, and the provincial house was later named "Our Lady of Lebanon."

In 1904, various local communities requested the Marist Brothers' assistance. Among them, the Congregation of Our Lady of Sion, the Armenian-Catholic community, the Maronite community, and the Jesuits in Bikfaya and Sidon. In 1908, the Marists took charge of the Collège Saint-Louis in Sidon, which they later purchased in 1924. Additionally, the Brothers assumed responsibility for several schools in different regions, including in Batroun, Hadath, Deir al-Qamar, Beit Chabab, and Zahlé. In the same year, the Brothers established the Collège Mariste Notre-Dame de Lourdes in Byblos. In 1911, two Brothers from Ottoman Syria founded a school in Betafo, Madagascar. However, in 1914, the Ottomans expelled foreigners and transformed Marist schools into barracks, forcing the Brothers to flee to Italy and take refuge near Turin.

In 1920, only 20 Brothers were able to return from Europe and they decided to reopen nine schools, including ones in Syria (Aleppo and Damascus) and Lebanon (Batroun, Amcheet, Byblos, Jounieh, Deir al-Qamar, Sidon, and Zahlé). More Brothers arrived, and young Lebanese Christians joined the congregation. By 1939, the number of Marist Brothers in Lebanon and Syria had increased to ninety, but World War II later significantly reduced their numbers. As a result, the Brothers had to permanently withdraw from Batroun in 1952 and Deir al-Qamar in 1954, and stopped teaching in the schools of Aleppo and Damascus, which were nationalized by the Government of Syria in 1967. In 1961, the Collège Saint-Louis was transferred from Sidon to Rmeileh, where it was renamed Collège Notre-Dame de Fátima and reached a student population of 2,000, consisting of approximately equal numbers of Christians and Muslims.

In 1966, the Collège du Sacré Cœur in Jounieh was relocated to Dik el-Mehdi, and was renamed Collège des Frères Maristes Champville. From 1975 onwards, Lebanon was plagued by clashes and a long war. Champville survived the Lebanese Civil War.

Today, Marist Brothers collaborate with secular Marists to provide a Catholic education to Lebanese students.

== Facts and figures ==
Champville was founded in 1966 as a direct continuation of the Collège du Sacré-Cœur of Jounieh which was founded in 1903 by French missionaries. Its actual history dates back to 1868. It lies upon a green hill in Dik El Mehdi not far from the Embassy of the United States in Lebanon and occupies around 23 hectares of surface. There are approximately 3,000 students enrolled in the institution. The school teaches fifteen academic years, divided into eight groups:

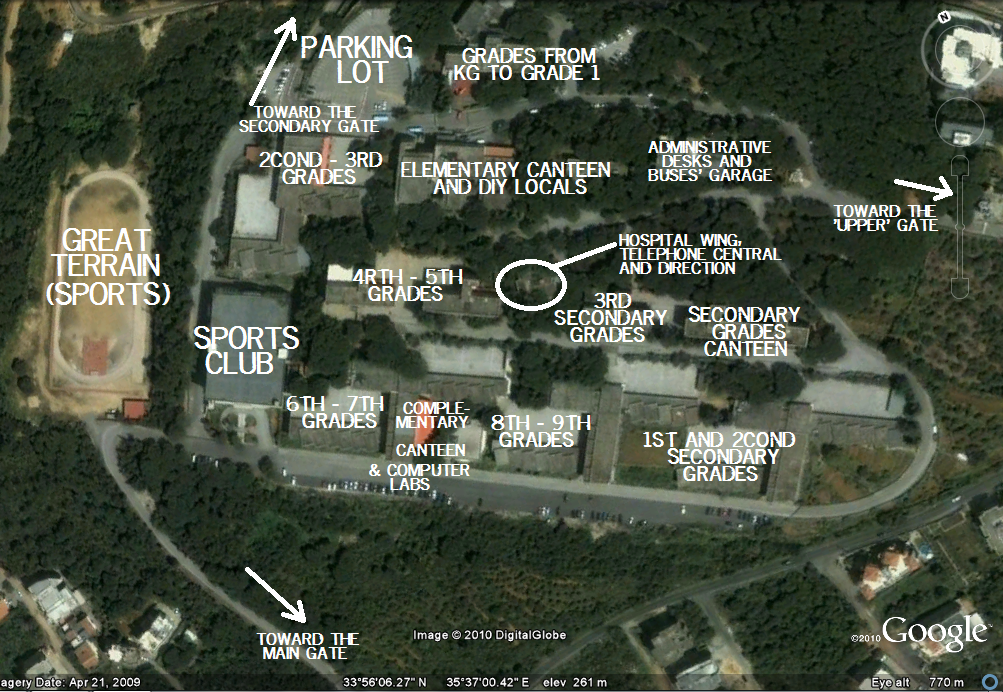
Campus Map.

1. Kindergarten (Cycle des Maternelles)
2. Primary school I (Cycle des Benjamins)
3. Primary school II (Cycle des Minimes)
4. Primary school III (Cycle des Petits)
5. Middle school I (Cycle des Moyens)
6. Middle school II (Cycle des Grands)
7. Secondary school (Cycle des Secondaires)
8. Senior (Cycle des Terminales)

=== Teaching and learning ===
Champville prepares its students for two baccalaureates: the Lebanese and the French Baccalauréat. Students have the option to pursue only the Lebanese Baccalaureate or both. The School provides a bilingual teaching of Arabic and French from the start. Starting from the sixth grade, the school provides mandatory English language courses. Champville places the utmost importance on scientific subjects, offering mathematics and sciences across all preparatory classes, and extending to include mathematics, biology, physics, and chemistry in middle school. In the senior year, students at Champville can choose from three baccalaureate tracks: General Sciences, specializing in mathematics and physics; Life Sciences, focusing on biology and chemistry; and Social and Economic Sciences, with a concentration in sociology and economics. Champville does not offer a Linguistics baccalaureate track, contributing to its reputation as a purely scientific school (French: 'une école purement scientifique'). Simultaneously, the school offers DIY training for students from the second to the eighth grades, computer studies from the second grade through to the second secondary grade, media studies from the sixth to the ninth grades, and an introduction to scientific research, known in French as 'Travail Personnel Encadré' (TPE), which translates to 'Personal Coached Work'.

== Timing ==
Champville distinguishes itself from other Lebanese schools by offering a ten-minute break after every fifty-minute class. After the fifth class, they get a forty-minute break, during which they may head for one of the cafeterias for lunch.

== Extra-curriculars ==
Champville provides five options for extra-curricular activities: sports, cultural activities, scouting, Eucharistic Youth Movement (EYM) (French: Mouvement Eucharistique des Jeunes (MEJ)), and Christian Life Teaching.

=== Sports and cultural activities ===
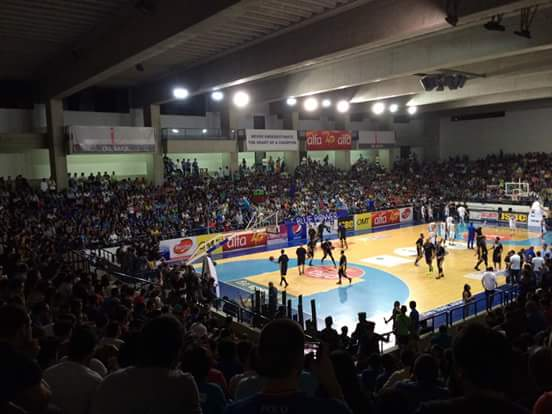
A view of Champville's basketball court.

The Sports department of Champville organizes inter-grade tournaments in football, basketball, and more ball games. The school has a basketball team, CS Maristes, that competes in the Lebanese Basketball League.
