= Tobia Aoun =

Lebanese Catholic prelate

His Excellency, The Most Reverend Tobia Aoun Ch.LH, OM
- Maronite Catholic Archbishop of Beirut
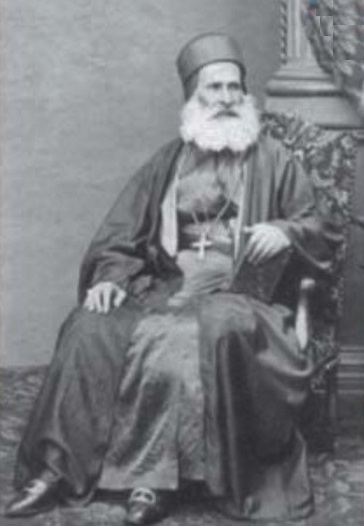
- Catholic Archbishop Tobia Aoun
- Church: Maronite Church

Orders
- Consecration: 19 March 1841 by Joseph Peter Hobaish

Personal details
- Born: December 1803
- Died: April 4, 1871 (aged 67)

Tobia Aoun Ch.LH OM (December 1803 – 4 April 1871) (Tubiya, Tobias, Tubiyya, Aun, Awn) was a Lebanese Catholic prelate who served as Assistant to the Pontifical Throne, Maronite Archbishop of Beirut, Count of Rome, Knight of the French Legion of Honour, Knight of the Ottoman Order of the Medjidie, and Council Father of the First Vatican Council.

He was the first Maronite Archbishop of Beirut and a much respected leader of the Maronites during the 1859–1860 conflict in Mount Lebanon.

== Life ==
Tobia Aoun was born in December 1803 in a small village along the banks of the Damour River in Lebanon, under the Maronite Patriarchy of Joseph VII Peter Tyan.

In 1815, at the young age of 12, he joined the Congregation of the Virgin Mary. Three years later, at the age of 15, he joined the monastic order of the Antonins "Lebanese Maronite Order", vowing chastity, poverty, and obedience.

On 30 September 1823, upon the recommendation of the monks of the monastery, he was ordained a priest by Maronite Patriarch Joseph VIII Peter Hobaish.

In 1827, the same Maronite Patriarch called upon him to become his personal secretary. Satisfied with his hard work and dedication, the Maronite Patriarch requested that Aoun manage the finances of the Maronite Patriarchy, including the administration of the Maronite colleges and orphanages.

On 13 March 1841, Patriarch Hobaish nominated him Maronite Bishop of Saint-John-Acre in partibus infidelium and Vicar General of the Patriarchy.

Bishop Boutros Abu Karam, Maronite Bishop of Beirut since 18 November 1819, had died on 15 January 1844 thus leaving the Archbishopric of Beirut vacant. On 31 December 1844, Tobias Aoun was elected Archbishop of Beirut and installed in this archeparchy on February 9, 1845. The Maronite Patriarch's representative in Rome and Constantinople, Bishop Nicolas Murad, had been actively lobbying to become the new archbishop of Beirut, but the Maronite Patriarch clearly confirmed Aoun as the new archbishop. The Pope, however, suspended this confirmation upon the advice of the Apostolic Delegate, believing that neither Murad nor Aoun were suitable candidates for the Archbishopric of Beirut. A petition signed by 519 Maronite dignitaries protested the appointment of Aoun as Archbishop of Beirut, especially since Murad, they argued, had received a two-thirds majority. The French Consul in Beirut believed that the major Maronite families "favoured Murad because of his patriotism and devotion to the cause of his coreligionists". Bishop Aoun finally took possession of his chair on June 10, 1847. He would remain Archbishop of Beirut until his death.

Tobia Aoun, wearing the insignia of the French Legion of Honour and the Ottoman Order of the Medjidie

Tobia Aoun

Tobia Aoun photographed in Rome, 1869

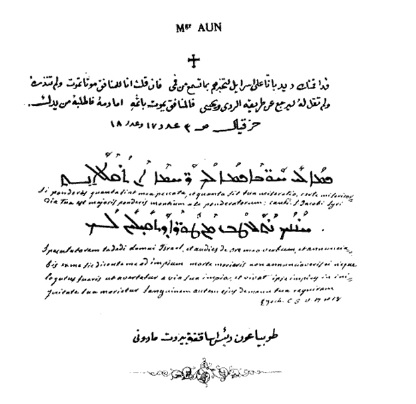
Tobia Aoun's signature in Rome, 1869

Bishop Tobia participated in two Maronite synods in electing the Patriarchs of the Maronite Church. According to Maronite procedures, the Patriarch is elected by the Maronite archbishops and bishops reunited in a synod, whereby a two-thirds majority is needed for the election to be validated. With the death of Patriarch Joseph Peter Hobaish on 23 May 1845, a synod was convened but did not meet until August due to the sectarian violence destabilizing Mount Lebanon in the early stages of the Double Qaimaqamate government. Bishop Joseph Ragi El Khazen was elected Patriarch on 18 August 1845 in Dimane and confirmed by Pope Gregory XVI on 19 January 1846. Nine years later, with the death of Patriarch Joseph IX Ragi El Khazen on 3 November 1854, Bishop Tobia participated in the synod of 12 November 1854 which elected Paul Peter Massad as Patriarch. This election was confirmed on 23 March 1855 by Pope Pius IX.

Eugène Poujade, the French Consul of Beirut in the 1840s, writes the following description of Bishop Tobias in his memoirs: "The Bishop of Saint-John-Acre, Mautran Tobia (Mautran is the name the Maronites give to their bishops), was a man of roughly forty years, of an imposing figure. His eye was small but full of finesse, softness, and sincerity. He is one of the most distinguished men that I have met in the Near-East. He only speaks Arabic but his superior spirit has him realize the genius of Europe, and it is he who has played the most important role in the political affairs of Lebanon. He had once been a monk and led a rebellion against the abbot of the Convent of Saint Anthony. For his actions, he was exiled to the Isle of Cyprus by the Sacred Congregation for the Propagation of the Faith. Since then, his exemplary conduct has allowed him to successively be named Bishop of Saint-John-Acre in partibus and Bishop of Beirut, one of the most important diocese of Lebanon due to it being the residence of the muchir (governor) and the European general consuls. I've rarely seen in a man the same high degree of simplicity, gentleness, firmness, wisdom, the elevation of the soul and genuine Christian humility".

The British envoy to Lebanon Sir Hugh Rose made the following description of Tobia Aoun on 9 September 1844: "Bishop Tubia is a violent, ambitious person of a Fellah family in the mixed district. He has strong anti-Druze and Ottoman feelings...at one time I thought that he had patriotic feelings; but if he has them, they are strongly mixed up with self-interest". This of course did not stop Rose in supporting Aoun over Murad as Archbishop of Beirut; writing to Aoun upon his nomination: "I was greatly pleased to hear you have been appointed over the bishopric of Beirut". Rose, writing to Bishop Aoun, expressed the desire that "we will always be friends".

An 1862 publication on the history of Lebanon describes Aoun as "pretentious and arrogant with some people, clever and shy with others". He is described as "a real tyrant with small feet, who appears strong only when shielded far away from his enemy".

Bishop Tobias Aoun had five brothers: Abboud, Sleiman, Nasr, Shehdan, Salhab.

== Travels to Rome, Paris, Constantinople ==
On 8 June 1862, Archbishop Tobia Aoun travelled to Rome and joined over 4000 Catholic priests in the canonization ceremony of the twenty-six Catholic martyrs of Japan. He was personally received by Pope Pius IX who named him Assistant to the Pontifical Throne, awarding him a gold and silver medal.

Tobia Aoun

In becoming Assistant to the Pontifical Throne, Tobia Aoun immediately entered the Papal nobility as Count of Rome.

In 1862, Bishop Aoun was received by Emperor Napoleon III in Paris and awarded the French Legion of Honour. That same year, he was received by Sultan Abdul-Aziz in Constantinople and awarded the Ottoman Empire's Order of Medjidjie (Nishan-i-Majidia).

In 1869, Tobia Aoun returned to Rome as Council Father of the Vatican Council called upon by Pope Pius IX. The Council had just met when King Victor Emmanuel II attacked Rome and deposed Pope Pius IX. Pius IX suspended the Council indefinitely on October 20, 1870.

Tobias Aoun eventually returned home, dying on Holy Week April 4, 1871.

== Role in 1840–41, 1845 Civil Wars ==
Concerning the 1840–1841 and 1845 civil conflicts in Mount Lebanon which followed the Crisis of 1840, the British envoy to Lebanon Sir Hugh Rose declared to Her Majesty's Secretary Lord Aberdeen on 17 May 1845 : "As regards the Maronite clergy, it is sufficient to say that they have organized the war...Your Lordship is already acquainted with the pecuniary aid given by Bishop Tubia for the purchase of arms. Indeed, when it is known that the Maronite Patriarch threatens to excommunicate those who do not obey the summons to go to war, all is said". On 4 May 1845, Sir Hugh Rose wrote to the British Ambassador in Constantinople, Sir Stratford Canning, stating that "the Maronite Patriarch, Bishop Tubia, and the clergy have taken a most decided line to induce the Christians to take arms". He states in the same letter that "Bishop Tubia gave 3000 piastres the other day to a village now burnt to purchase arms", as well as "a bond for 9000 piastres more for the same purpose". Aoun was responsible for drawing up a petition, signed by the Maronites, that "stated that under no circumstances whatever, would they, the Christians, ever voluntarily consent to be governed by a Turkish governor". Sir Hugh Rose explains on 12 January 1842 that "Bishop Tubia assembled the Christian deputies, both lay and clerical, and made them sign on the 10th ultimo a "Hedjé", a writing by which they bound themselves to petition the Porte for a Prince of the House of Shehab, taking, moreover, an oath, that whoever violated it should be answerable both with his life and his property to the remainder (an Arab formula)".

Letter from Bishop Tobia Aoun to Sir Colonel Rose, 9 March 1844

As attested by the British Consul in Beirut Mr. Wood to Her Majesty's Secretary Henry John Temple Viscount Palmerston, Bishop Tobia played an active diplomatic role in establishing a new governing body for Lebanon following the 1840–1841 Civil War. In a letter dated 7 September 1841, Mr. Wood states: "Soon after my arrival, I received the visit of the Maronite Bishop Tubia, who was sent by the Patriarch to felicitate me, and to communicate to me the prelate's sentiments respecting the new arrangement to be made and the concessions granted by the Sublime Porte to the inhabitants of Lebanon". On 2 September 1841, the Maronite Patriarch wrote to Mr. Wood: "I send you Monsignor Tubia to converse with you, and to discuss this matter...I have again written to him, recommending him to communicate to you the impossibility of accomplishing your wishes".

On 27 March 1842, Sir Hugh Rose wrote to Lord Aberdeen that "Bishop Tubia, in January, on an alarm of his arrest by the Turks, requested an asylum in my house, should it prove to be correct".

Further proof of Tobia Aoun's role as diplomatic representative of the Maronite nation is attested by Sir Hugh Rose in a letter to Lord Aberdeen dated 7 June 1844 in which Rose states that Aoun is "the agent of the Patriarch and the real agent of the Maronite people, recognized as such by his Patriarch and the Turkish authorities in the important matters of the Government of the Mountain and the indemnities". In working towards the creation of a viable government for Mount Lebanon, Bishop Tobia declared to the Ottoman authorities on 20 March 1844 that the Christian deputies he represented would never "accept the Druze government, that they would rather that their heads should be cut off than accept that Government".

The British Ambassador to the Ottoman Porte Sir Stratford Canning was satisfied by the diplomatic efforts of Bishop Aoun, stating on 17 September 1843 that "the moderation of the Christian party, as expressed by Bishop Tubia, is highly gratifying to those who take a real interest in the pacification of Mount Lebanon".

Bishop Aoun had also served as the Patriarch's representative in the 'Indemnity Divan' which sought to restitute financial losses and offer compensation to all claimants who had suffered material losses during the 1840–1841 Civil War. Sir Hugh Rose confirms on 28 April 1844 that "Bishop Tubia (he is not himself a claimant) and those claiming compensation in and about Djouni deny strongly that any indemnity whatever has been paid for shops or coffee-shops in Djouni". On 10 August 1843, Bishop Aoun assured Sir Hugh Rose that "it was not his wish to ruin the Druzes by any excessive payment, but they should give a reasonable satisfaction to the Christians". Sir Hugh Rose states that Bishop Tobia declared: "Let the Druze, as a first step, restore at once all the plundered personal and moveable property still in their hands; and, secondly, let them engage to aid the building of such houses as were burnt by them. Let them do this; let them give this proof of atonement, and I will engage that the indemnification in money shall not be made a matter of difficulty by the Christians". Due to the various misunderstandings that arose during these meeting, Bishop Aoun decided to resign from his position at the Divan. Sir Hugh Rose states that both he and Mr. d'Adelbourg, the Austrian consul in Beirut, approved the Bishop's decision to resign. Though the deputies of the Divan requested that Aoun be "re-appointed, stating that he had great influence over them, and was devoted to their interests", the Ottoman authorities refused this option altogether. Sir Hugh Rose applauded this refusal, believing that "the absence of a political and violent bishop, possessing entire influence over a number of political agitators, was certainly, in the present state of affairs, much more desirable than his presence".

In conclusion, it cannot be said that Sir Hugh Rose esteemed Bishop Tobia or the Maronites very much. On 9 August 1844, Rose deplored to Lord Aberdeen the "want of principle of all Arabs, both clergy and laity", stating that "they all, nearly without exception, have their price; if it is not money, it is something else". Rose affirmed in the same letter that "Bishop Tubia has given indication that his sternness is pliable; there have been secret requests on his part for permission to import corn duty free for his own house".

== Role in 1860 Civil War ==
Bishop Aoun's role in the 1860 Civil War and its aftermath were much spoken of in the press and memoirs of the European diplomats who witnessed these events. In genuine calculated colonial strategy, their sentiments often shifted according to geopolitical alliances, with the Protestant British often at odds with the Bishop, and the Catholic French applauding his humanitarian and diplomatic efforts. The Franco-Maronite alliance, over a thousand years old, reached a culminating point in 1860 when Napoleon III dispatched 6000 French soldiers to Beirut in protection of the Maronites, essentially occupying Mount Lebanon with the approval of the Ottoman authorities. Though the French military presence would not last very long, it heightened tensions in London where British politicians were seeing the direct dismemberment of the Ottoman Empire to their geopolitical disadvantage. The possible colonization of Mount Lebanon by the French, applauded by the local Maronite clergy, was obviously contrary to British interests in the area. Khurshid Pasha, the Ottoman governor of Sidon, claimed "that at the beginning of the war, Maronite priests stirred up their parishioners by promising them that the French fleet would come to their assistance". For the Ottomans, European agents and local Maronites were responsible for enticing the war, with the ultimate goal of re-establishing a strong pro-European Christian government for Lebanon. Ultimately, the Ottomans would have no choice but to work with Tobia Aoun and the Maronite clergy in solidifying their rule over Mount Lebanon. This is best exemplified by the fact that Aoun, though attacked by the British as the prime instigator of the war, was immediately sent to the warring villages of Mount Lebanon by the Ottoman Porte's envoy, Fuad Pasha, to restore absolute peace and order in his name. In Bishop Aoun's archdiocese, a total of 67 churches were destroyed and 3 priests murdered in the 1860 Civil War.

According to American Protestant missionary Henry Harris Jessup in Fifty-Three Years in Syria, Bishop Tobia was "the man who next to the Patriarch had done more than any other Maronite to precipitate this awful civil war". He writes of him numerous times as the "notorious Maronite Bishop Tobia". In the Missionary Herald, the official paper of the American Board of Commissioners for Foreign Missions, Jassup writes of Aoun on 14 March 1865 : "The Notorious Maronite Bishop came to (Baabda) with a swarm of priests, dispensing indulgences in accordance with the Pope's encyclical letter".

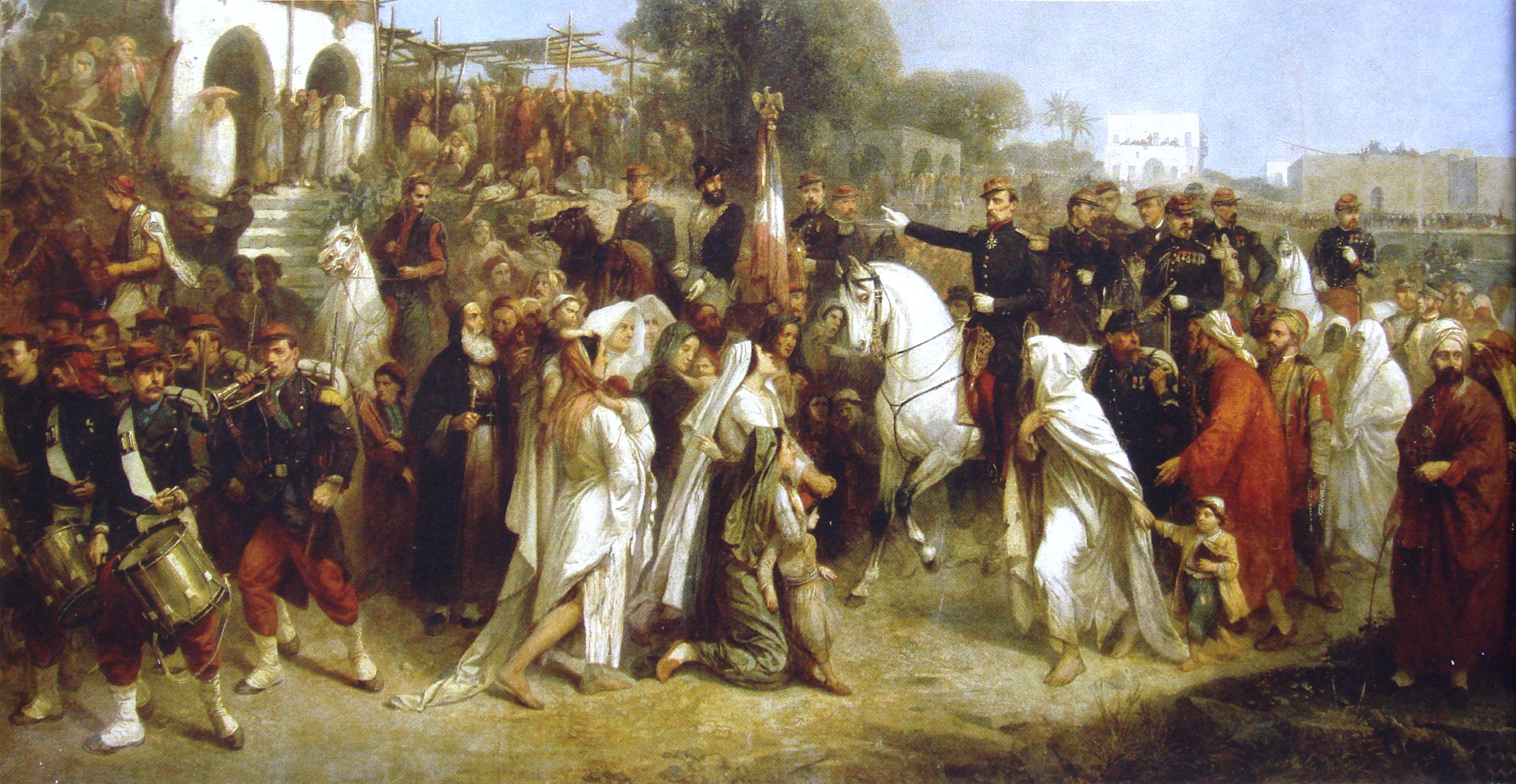
1860 Lebanon Civil War

Lord Dufferin, the United Kingdom's extraordinary envoy to Lebanon in 1860–1861, wrote to Her Majesty's Secretary of State Lord John Russell in his Correspondence Relating to the Affairs of Syria: "With regard to Bishop Tobia, who may be considered one of the chief causes of all the misery and bloodshed which has existed in the Lebanon, I would only say that his removal from the country is an absolute necessity. Unfortunately, it will be difficult to discover any direct evidence against him...(His) ambition and passion for intrigue verify one's conception of the worst specimen of a medieval ecclesiastic".

Lord Dufferin, writing to Her Majesty's Secretary of State Lord Russell on 19 December 1860, stated that Tobia Aoun exercised a "sinister influence" in Lebanon, and that his "withdrawal from Beirut was insisted upon as a necessary preliminary to all chance of peace". In this dispatch, Lord Dufferin insinuates that Tobia Aoun is responsible for the 20,000 pistols imported directly into Lebanon between 1857 and 1860. He refutes the notion that the Maronites are "saintly martyrs" but rather "as savage and bloodthirsty in their traditional warfare as their pagan neighbours".

On 18 January 1861, Lord Dufferin wrote Henry Bulwer, British ambassador to the Ottoman Empire, that during the Civil War the rebel Maronite leaders "were encouraged and countenanced in their excesses by Bishop Tobia and some of his brother ecclesiastics".

In the British "Journal of the Foreign Affairs Committees" dated 4 December 1861, Tobia Aoun and the Maronite bishops are described as "unprincipled, ambitious priests", guilty of "wickedness and audacious treason". The same journal states that "It is really humiliating to hear men who call themselves the servants of Christ bellow forth the first principle of the devil: murder!".

On 16 September 1860, the French general Auguste-Alexandre Ducrot wrote of Aoun: "I received today the visit of a figure who has, for many years, played a great role in all the affairs of Lebanon: it is Mgr. Tobie, Bishop of the Diocese of Beirut".

An 1862 publication on the history of Lebanon states that Bishop Tobia was responsible for the conversion to Catholicism of Medjid Shehab, grandson of the famed Prince Beshir II. Having gone into exile to Constantinople with his grandfather Bashir II, Medjid had returned to Lebanon and was supported by Aoun and the Maronites as a possible candidate for governor of Mount Lebanon.

In 1862, the Irish writer Richard Robert Madden described Bishop Tobias as a "virtuous, pious, and a peaceably-disposed Christian prelate" in his book The Turkish Empire in its Relations with Christianity and Civilization.

In 1876, the French author and diplomat Eugène-Melchior de Vogüé wrote of "the savage and heroic figure of Bishop Tobias leading his flock to combat".
