= 2011–12 Lebanese Basketball League =

The 2011-2012 season was the 16th edition of the Lebanese Basketball League. The regular season began on Saturday, October 22, 2011 and ended on Friday April 20, 2012. The playoffs began on Thursday, April 26 and ended with the 2012 Finals on Sunday May 13, 2012, after Champville SC defeated Anibal Zahle in 4 games to win their first title (new format).

== Regular season ==
=== Standings ===
#	Team	GP	W	L	Points
1	Champville SC	16	15	1	46
2	Riyadi Beirut	16	15	1	46
3	Anibal Zahle	16	9	7	34
4	Sagesse Beirut	16	7	9	30
5	Byblos Club	16	7	9	30
6	Bejjeh SC	16	7	9	30
7	Mouttahed Tripoli	16	6	10	28
8	Hoops Club	16	5	11	26
9	Antranik SC	16	1	15	18
10	Chabibet Haouch El Oumara	7	0	7	7

- Chabibet Haouch El Oumara withdrew in the 7th round

== Final 8 ==
#	Team	GP	W	L	Points
1	Champville SC	30	27	3	84
2	Riyadi Beirut	30	26	4	79
3	Anibal Zahle	30	19	11	65
4	Sagesse Beirut	30	16	14	62
5	Mouttahed Tripoli	30	13	17	56
6	Byblos Club	30	11	19	49
7	Bejjeh SC	30	8	22	42
8	Hoops Club	30	7	23	41

== Playoffs ==
=== Brackets ===
Semifinals
1	Champville SC	3
4	Sagesse Beirut	0
3	Anibal Zahle	3
2	Riyadi Beirut	2

Finals
1	Champville SC	3
3	Anibal Zahle	1

== Statistics leaders ==
Category	Player	Team	Statistic
Points per game	Desmond Penigar	Byblos Club	28.5
Rebounds per game	Desmond Penigar	Byblos Club	12.1
Assists per game	Rodrigue Akl	Anibal Zahle	6.4
steals per game	Austin Johnson	Mouttahed Tripoli	2.7
Blocks per game	Ismail Ahmad	Riyadi Beirut	1.8

== Awards ==
- Player of the Year: Fadi El Khatib, Champville SC
- Guard of the Year: Austin Johnson, Mouttahed Tripoli
- Forward of the Year: Fadi El Khatib, Champville SC
- Center of the Year: Samuel Hoskin, Champville SC
- Newcomer of the Year: Samuel Hoskin, Champville SC
- Import of the Year: Samuel Hoskin, Champville SC
- Domestic Player of the Year: Fadi El Khatib, Champville SC
- Defensive Player of the Year: Ismail Ahmad, Riyadi Beirut
- First Team:
  - G: Austin Johnson, Mouttahed Tripoli
  - F: Desmond Penigar, Byblos Club
  - F: Fadi El Khatib, Champville SC
  - F: Ismail Ahmad, Riyadi Beirut
  - F/C: Samuel Hoskin, Champville SC
- Second Team:
  - PG: Rodrigue Akl, Anibal Zahle
  - G: Jasmon Youngblood, Anibal Zahle
  - F/G: Jean AbdelNour, Riyadi Beirut
  - F/C: Bassel Bawji, Mouttahed Tripoli
  - C: Joe Vogel, Riyadi Beirut

== Lebanese Basketball Cup ==
On May 22, 2012, Anibal Zahle defeated Hoops Club in the finals of the cup.

Anibal Zahle reached the Final after beating the newly crowned Lebanese Basketball League champions Champville SC in the Semifinals. As for Hoops Club they reached this stage after winning against Riyadi Beirut by forfeit due to the decision taken by the Riyadi administration.
