= CS Maristes =

Maristes
- Nickname: Wolves
- Leagues: Lebanese Basketball League
- Founded: 1967
- History: Champville Club; 1967–2022; Cercle Sportif Maristes; 2022–present
- Arena: Champville Club
- Capacity: 5000
- Location: Collège des Frères Maristes Champville, Dik El Mehdi, Lebanon
- Team colors: Navy, Light blue, and white
- President: Akram Safa
- Head coach: Allen Abaz
- Championships: 1 (2012)
Home	Away

CS Maristes, formerly known as Champville Club SC (Arabic: نادي الشانفيل الرياضي), is a Lebanese basketball team from Dik El Mehdi, Lebanon. The team competes in the Lebanese Basketball League. Since its establishment in 1967, the team has been affiliated with the Collège Mariste Champville ("Champville"), a private Marist Roman Catholic educational institution. After a disagreement with Champville's management in 2022, the club was renamed CS Maristes.

== History ==
In game 4 of the 2011–2012 Finals, Champville SC defeated Anibal Zahle 63–57. As a result, Champville SC won the series 3–1. The finals did not end without problems though, just like the semi-finals, as “A large part of the Annibal Zahle audience was absent from the game in Zahlé, after online appeals were posted on the Lebanese Forces website calling on March 14 alliance supporters to boycott the game and to follow it from the Martyrs Square in Zahlé".

Ahead of the 2022-23 season, the basketball club had a disagreement with the school, leading to its rebranding as CS Maristes. Additionally, they began using the Antoine Choueiri Stadium in Ghazir as their home arena

== Squad ==
Champville roster
Players
Coaches

Pos.	No.	Nat.	Name	Ht.
SG	22	(Lebanon)	Salem, Jimmy	1.90 m (6 ft 3 in)
C	15	(Lebanon)	El Khatib, Hadi	2.04 m (6 ft 8 in)
SG	35	(Lebanon)	Jarrouge, Jean-Marc	1.90 m (6 ft 3 in)
SF	13	(Lebanon)	Abi Kheres, Marc	1.97 m (6 ft 6 in)
PF	11	(Lebanon)	Samaha, Gebrael	2.06 m (6 ft 9 in)
SG	0	(Lebanon)	Harfouch, Bassel	1.93 m (6 ft 4 in)
PG	4	(Lebanon)	Massaad, Rudy	1.85 m (6 ft 1 in)
SG	72	(Lebanon)	Sleiman, Ray	1.87 m (6 ft 2 in)
C	31	(Lebanon)	Assaf, Mostafa	2.05 m (6 ft 9 in)

Head coach

- (Bosnia and Herzegovina) Allen Abaz

Assistant coach(es)

- (Lebanon) Adel Khoueiry

Legend

- (C) Team captain
- Injured

== Honours ==
Lebanese Basketball League

- Champions (1): 2011–12
  - Runners-up (5): 2001–02, 2003-04, 2009–10, 2010–11, 2020–21

Lebanese Cup

- Winners (2): 2004, 2010

Lebanese SuperCup

- Winners (1): 2011

West Asian Basketball League

- Winners (1): 2013

Dubai International Basketball Tournament

- Winners (1): 2004

== Arab/Asian cups ==
2010–2011 WABA: took 2nd place (3–1) in Group B; Arab Club Championships: Took 1st place (5–0) in Group B, beat Al Riyadi (73–69) in the quarter-finals, lost to Sharjah (75–80) in the semi-finals.

2011–2012 WABA: took 2nd place (3–1) in Group B, lost to Al Riyadi (Lebanon) 1–2 in the semi-finals.

== Notable National and NBA players ==
- (Lebanon) Fadi El Khatib
- (Lebanon) Bassel Bawji
- (Lebanon) Rony Fahed
- (Lebanon) Ali Haidar
- (Lebanon) Elie Mechantaf
- (Lebanon) Joe Vogel
- (Lebanon) Ali Mezher
- (Lebanon) (United States) Daniel Faris
- (Georgia (country)) Nikoloz Tskitishvili
- (United States) Jeremy Pargo
- (United States) Isaiah Austin
- (United States) Travis Trice
- (United States) Marcus Banks
- (United States) Daniel Orton
- (United States) DeShawn Sims
- (United States) JJ Hickson
- (United States) Reyshawn Terry
- (United States) (Bulgaria) Brandon Young
- (United States) Julius Hodge
- (United States) Donté Greene
- (United States) DeWayne Jackson
- (Iran) Hamed Haddadi
- (Australia) (South Sudan) (Lebanon) Ater Majok
