= Pierre Bostani =

Maronite prelate (1819–1899)

- Catholic Archbishop
- Church: Maronite Church

Orders
- Consecration: 12 October 1842

Personal details
- Born: November 1819
- Died: 15 November 1899 (aged 79–80)

Pierre Bostani or Boutros Boustani (November 1819 – 15 November 1899) was a Maronite prelate, Assistant to the Pontifical Throne, Archbishop of Tyre and Sidon, Count of Rome, Bishop of Saint-John-Acre, and Council Father of the First Vatican Council.

== Life ==
Bostani was born in Debbié in November 1819 and baptized 8 days later. Having chosen the priesthood at a young age, Bostani enrolled in the Ain-Warca Maronite university where he studied Syriac, Arabic, Latin, Italian, rhetoric, philosophy, dogma, moral, canon law, the calendar and Church music. He was ordained a Maronite priest on 12 October 1842 by the rector of the university. Upon leaving the university, Bostani taught Syriac and Arabic at the Maronite seminary of Tyr and Sidon for two years. He then returned to his university to teach the youth enrolled there. He had only been teaching for a year that he was quickly called upon by his relative, the Archbishop of Tyre and Sidon Abdallah Bostani, who named him his private secretary. In 1845, Pierre Bostani was called by the Maronite Patriarch to serve as his private secretary, treasurer of the Patriarchy, judge for ecclesiastical affairs, and Vicar General of the Maronite Patriarchy. He would hold this position for 11 years.

On 28 July 1856, Maronite Patriarch Massad named him Coadjutor-Archbishop of Tyre and Sidon alongside his relative the Archbishop Abdallah Bostani who was becoming very old and weak. He also received the title of Bishop of Saint-John-Acre. He immediately set out to preach in his diocese, repairing the various abuses and combatting the advances made by the Protestant missionaries in converting the people. His biography states that he challenged, on four distinct occasions, the Protestant ministers to public discussions of faith and religious doctrine in front of six thousand people in the villages of Deir al-Qamar and Hasbeiya.

Bishop Pierre Bostani

Eugène Poujade, the French Consul of Beirut, travelled with his relative Bishop Abdallah Bostani to the 1845 synod in Dimane for the election of the new Patriarch of the Maronites. He states that he was the oldest Bishop present. He says of him: "he was a small old man full of youth, very active and filled with gaiety. His liveliness was inexhaustible, he either apostrophized the peasants on the road or worried about the food he would find in Meyfouk. But behind this gaiety was a character of steel who had braved a thousand dangers. The Druze, in the last conflict, had burnt his convent and destroyed everything he owned, he was ruined." Poujade states that Bishop Abdallah Bostani particularly regretted a painting of the Virgin Mary given to him by Emir Bechir II that had been burnt by the Druze in the conflicts. The Apostolic Delegate had replaced this loss with a painting of the Virgin Mary inspired by Sassoferrato which he gave to Bishop Abdallah Bostani.

Following the sectarian violence which afflicted Mount Lebanon in the 1840s, Bishop Abdallah Bostani made "an impassioned plea to the women of France" stating: "thus would our freedom be restored to us; are we not united with you, O French in heart? Is not our blood and honour your blood and honour?...Our enemies curse and deride us saying: where are your French friends? Where are your Christian kings? Where are their warships and soldiers? Did they come to your aid, O infidel dogs?...It was our love for France and our calling upon her for support that has brought upon us these catastrophes".

Bishop Abdallah Bostani had fervently applauded the Maronite delegate to Rome, Bishop Nicolas Murad, in his tour of European capitals pushing for the return of a Christian government to Mount Lebanon. Keeping him supplied with petitions of supplication from his parishioners, Abdallah Bostani sent Bishop Murad letters and petitions which decried the violent conditions "in the bishopric that Bustani had served so faithfully for forty years". Cardinal Fransoni, the Prefect of the Sacred Congregation for the Propagation of the Faith, was asked by Murad and Bostani to plea the Holy See for the return of stability to Mount Lebanon, including the return of Bashir II as governor.

During the Civil War of 1860, Archbishop Bostani's archdiocese suffered terribly, with 101 churches destroyed and 13 priests killed. Though having gone into hiding to avoid being killed, Archbishop Pierre Bostani was widely celebrated for having tried to save the Christians fleeing the massacres in Jezzine in 1860. Having come to his door, Bostani took them in and wrote Mr. Derighello, the French Consul in Sidon, for armed protection so the group may travel safely to Sidon. Though many would be killed en route, a few arrived safely to Sidon where they received shelter at the French Consul's residence. Bishop Pierre Bostani was very thankful to the French Empire of Napoleon III who had sent a fleet of 6000 men to Lebanon following the 1860 Civil War. In a letter to Charles Schefer (1820–1898), Napoleon III's envoy to Lebanon and the French Foreign Ministry's First Secretary Interpreter for Oriental Languages, Bishop Bostani wrote that the French have come "to protect the Christians and deliver them from oppression and tyranny". The Maronite Patriarch communicated to Schefer that the arrival of French forces to Lebanon had "saved us from imminent total ruin".

Pierre Bostani became Archbishop of Tyre and Sidon on 5 October 1866.

As this archdiocese neither had an official seat nor any buildings, Pierre Bostani purchased in 1860 an old palace in Beiteddine which he restored and enlarged thus making it a seminary and the official seat of his archbishopric. He restored seven churches which had been destroyed, and built six others. He founded the college of Saint Joseph in Jezzine and restored an hospice and a Maronite monastery both located in Deir al-Qamar.

The French historian Baptistin Poujoulat made the following observation of Bishop Pierre Bostani in 1860: "In general, all the Maronite bishops are recommended by their virtue and knowledge of science. One of these, Boutros Bostani, a child of the country, has in him something of Fénelon and Bossuet. He is gentle, pious, persuasive; he is knowledgeable, invincible in his faith, eloquent. He has upheld, recently, magnificent battles against Anglicanism which aims to take hold, in vain, of the Catholic mountain. These honorable struggles have given him the name Thunder of the Protestants. Too poor to pay for professors in his college of Machemouché, he is personally responsible for almost all the education. Within this college, thrice burnt by the Druze and twice rebuilt by the Bishop, he taught not only theology but also philosophy, history, Arab and Syriac literature, and jurisprudence".

Like many Maronite bishops at this time, Pierre Bostani was the de facto diplomatic representative of his bishopric vis-à-vis the European nations represented in Lebanon. For example, he had been prudent in overly trusting the new French consul appointed to Beirut, Count Bentivoglio. Though the brother-in-law of the French Minister of Foreign Affairs, Count Colonna-Walewski, an illegitimate son of Napoleon I, Bostani feared that Bentivoglio was indeed not French but an Italian who had no former schooling in the art of diplomacy. Bostani spoke of the fact that Bentivoglio had served in the Italian army as a major and was only French by nationality. He referred to him as the "Consul Intruder". He particularly attacked the Consul for enriching himself from funds sent from France for the needy, accusing him of spending 12000 francs for the road in front of his residence to be paved "so that his lady belles could be comfortable when calling on him".

Like many Maronite bishops, Bostani and the Maronites "were in the habit of having recourse to the consuls of France as if they were French themselves", stating that "their blood had been mixed for many generations".

== Travels to Rome, Paris, Istanbul ==
Bostani accompanied Maronite Patriarch Massad on his trip to Rome in June 1867 to attend the 1800th anniversary of the martyrdom of Saints Peter and Paul. Patriarch Massad was the second Maronite Patriarch to travel to Rome after Jeremy el-Amchiti had done so in the 13th century. It was in Rome that Archbishop Bostani was named Assistant to the Pontifical Throne by Pope Pius IX on 17 June 1867. In becoming Assistant to the Pontifical Throne, Pierre Bostani immediately entered the Papal nobility as Count of Rome.

Following Rome, Patriarch Massad and Bostani travelled to France where they met Napoleon III. The delegation then journeyed to Istanbul where they were received by Sultan Abdul-Aziz in his palace. Archbishop Bostani was presented with the Ottoman Order of the Medjidie.

Two years later, Patriarch Massad requested that Archbishop Bostani head the Maronite delegation that would attend the First Vatican Council in Rome in 1869. On Friday 1 July 1870, during the 80th General Congregation of the Council, Archbishop Bostani celebrated the official mass in the Vatican.

The Council had just met when King Victor Emmanuel II attacked Rome and deposed Pope Pius IX. Pius IX suspended the Council indefinitely on 20 October 1870.

== Arrest and exile ==
On 1 June 1878, Archbishop Bostani was arrested and exiled to Jerusalem under order of Governor Rustem Pasha who personally blamed the Archbishop of violently turning the Maronite population against his authority. Never before had a Maronite prelate been exiled under order of an Ottoman governor. The Maronite population wrote to the Ottoman Grand Vizier, as well as the ambassadors of France, Russia, Germany, Italy, the United Kingdom, and Austria to protest the arrest and exile of the Archbishop. Cardinal Guibert of Paris and Bishop Dupanloup of Orléans both summoned the French government to pressure the Ottoman Porte in reinstating Archbishop Bostani to his archdiocese.

Governor Rustem Pasha was immediately called to the Sublime Porte in Constantinople to justify his actions. Upon the insistence of the French government, Archbishop Pierre Bostani returned to his Archdiocese on a French warship on 9 November 1878 Overseen by the Maronite Patriarch himself, the Maronites celebrated the return of their Archbishop with grand festivities that were long remembered by the Lebanese afterwards.

In his book on the history of Ottoman Lebanon, Engin Akarli argues that prelates such as Bostani and Archbishop Dibs of Beirut purposefully rallied the Maronites against the Ottoman government following the Ottoman state's defeat in the Russo-Turkish War of 1877–1878. Unfortunately for Bostani, the French ambassador in Constantinople and the British consul in Beirut, including the Apostolic Delegate Luigi Piavi, all sided with Rustem Pasha against him. French pressures at home would ultimately push the French government in reinstating Bostani.

== See also ==
- Boustani Family
