= Rayyane Tabet =

Lebanese visual artist

- Born: 1983 (age 42–43); Ashqout, Keserwan-Jbeil Governorate, Lebanon
- Education: Cooper Union, University of California, San Diego
- Occupation: Visual artist

Rayyane Tabet (born 1983) is a Lebanese visual artist, known for his sculpture. He has lived and worked in both Beirut and San Francisco.

== Early life and education ==
Rayyane Tabet was born in 1983 in Ashqout, Lebanon. He has training as an artist and as an architect, and has a Bachelor of Architecture degree (2008) from Cooper Union, and a MFA degree (2012) from the University of California, San Diego.

== Career ==
Tabet is a visual artist, known for his sculpture. Much of Tabet's work is based on research and mostly about socio-political history, informed by architecture.

The Five Distant Memories series was work from 2006 until 2016, about the transformation of Tabet's early childhood memories in relationship to objects, and situations. His first solo exhibition in Italy was La Mano De Dios (2016) at the Marino Marini Museum, which included work from his Five Distant Memories series.

In 2019, the exhibition Rayyane Tabet / Alien Property opened at the Metropolitan Museum of Art and displayed the museum's orthostat reliefs and Tabet's graphite transfers, Orthostates, in tandem with his family heirlooms. The exhibition explores the task of locating and tracing provenance, particularly through reference to the Alien Property Act and the objects purchased at auction by the museum after they had been seized by the Office of Alien Property Custodian. It conveys the fragmentation and division as Tell Halaf sat at the center of political governance and conflict. It also addresses the role of an encyclopedic museum in conversation and collaboration with the past, and its voices.

Tabet was selected to participate in the 2022 Whitney Biennial titled "Quiet as It's Kept" curated by Adrienne Edwards and David Breslin.

Tabet has been awarded the Emerging Artist Award of the Sharjah Biennial (2011); the Jury Prize of the Future Generation Art Prize (2012); and the Abraaj Group Art Prize (2013). His work can be found in public museum collections including at the Metropolitan Museum of Art.

== Exhibitions ==
- 2024 A Model, MUDAM, Luxembourg
- 2023 A Model: Prelude, MUDAM, Luxembourg City, Luxembourg
- 2023 Arabesque, Sfeir-Semler Downtown, Beirut, Lebanon
- 2023 The Return, Sfeir-Semler Karantina, Beirut, Lebanon
- 2022 Kunstenfestivaldesarts – 27th Edition, Various locations in Brussels, Belgium
- 2021 Rayyane Tabet: Arabesque, Sfeir-Semler Gallery, Hamburg, Germany
- 2020 A sun yellow with anger, Sfeir-Semler Gallery, Hamburg, Germany
- 2018 FRAGMENTS, Sfeir-Semler Karantina, Beirut, Lebanon
- 2015 ONLY GODS NEVER DIE, Sfeir-Semler Gallery, Hamburg, Germany
- 2013 The Shortest Distance Between Two Points, Sfeir-Semler Gallery, Beirut, Lebanon
- 2006 Moving Homes, Sfeir-Semler Gallery, Beirut, Lebanon

== Awards and residencies ==
- 2016 DAAD Artists in Residency Program, Berlin, Germany
- 2013 Abraaj Group Art Prize, Dubai, UAE
- 2012 Future Generation Art Prize Jury Award, Ukraine
- 2011 Sharjah Biennial 10 Artist Prize, Sharjah, UAE

== Publications ==
In 2018, Tabet published FRAGMENTS/BRUCHSTÜCKE, published by Kunstverein, Hamburg, DAAD Artists-in-Berlin Program & KAPH Books.

== See also ==
- Alien land laws
- Tell Halaf
