= Joseph Ragi El Khazen =

Head of the Maronite Church from 1845 to 1854

Joseph IX El Khazen (يوسف التاسع الخازن)
- Patriarch of Antioch
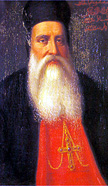
- Church: Maronite Church
- See: Patriarch of Antioch
- Elected: August 18, 1845
- Term ended: November 3, 1854
- Predecessor: Joseph Peter Hobaish
- Successor: Paul Peter Massad

Orders
- Consecration: April 6, 1830 (Bishop) by Joseph Peter Hobaish

Personal details
- Born: 1791 Ajaltoun, Lebanon
- Died: 3 November 1854 (aged 62–63) Dimane, Lebanon

Joseph IX Ragi El Khazen (1791, Ajaltoun, Lebanon – 3 November 1854, Dimane, Lebanon), (or Youssef El-Khazen, Gazen, Arabic: يوسف التاسع الخازن, Latin: Iosephus Alchasen) the 69th Maronite Catholic Patriarch of Antioch from 1845 until his death in 1854. He was previously Archeparch of Tripoli.

== Life ==
Joseph Ragi El Khazen was born in the village of Ajaltoun, in the Keserwan District, Lebanon in 1791, and he was a member of the Khazen family, which ruled the Keserwan District. The Khazen family had the privilege of nominating three Archbishops, including the one of Damascus. However, Joseph El Khazen was appointed Archbishop of the Maronite Catholic Archeparchy of Tripoli and so consecrated bishop on April 6, 1830, by the Maronite Patriarch Joseph Peter Hobaish.

When Patriarch Joseph Peter Hobaish died on May 23, 1845, Mount Lebanon was in the middle of the conflict between the Druze and Maronite communities after the so-called Double Qaimaqamate division of Lebanon. The bishops couldn't meet before August, and on August 18, 1845, they elected Joseph El Khazen as Patriarch. The election was contested by some local peasants who were supporters of another candidate, and Joseph El Khazen had to escape from Dimane to Zouk Mikael, where he took up his residence. The election was confirmed anyway by Pope Gregory XVI on January 19, 1846. His human qualities and his diplomatic skills earned to him soon the sympathy and support of the whole nation Maronite. El Khazen had the support of France, managed to persuade the warring parties to lay down their arms to restore peace in Lebanon.

Joseph El Khazen initially had to face the adversities of the conflict, including the Ottoman military invasion and repression against the Maronites in North Lebanon. He, who was of a mild disposition, tried to ease relations with Great Britain (which supported the Druzes) and the Ottomans, so obtaining some relief for his people. In 1850 he rescued some Christians during the massacre of Aleppo.

From a religious point of view, during his reign the issue of confessions ministered outside the church-buildings arose again, a use previously condemned by Rome, and again condemned by Rome on February 18, 1851. Joseph El Khazen died on November 3, 1854 in the winter Maronite Catholic Patriarchate in Dimane, Kadisha Valley, Lebanon.

== See also ==
- List of Maronite Patriarchs
- Maronite Church

== Sources ==
- Pierre Dib, v. Maronite (Eglise), https://archive.org/stream/dictionnairedet10pt1vaca#page/n59/mode/2up, Tome Dixième, première partie, Paris 1928, coll. 105–106.
- K. Rizk, Khazen Joseph Ragi, in Dictionnaire d'histoire et de géographie ecclésiastiques, 28 (2003), pp. 1424–1425.
