= Alberto Bustani Adem =

Mexican academic and entrepreneur

Alberto Bustani Adem (born in Mexico City, 1954) is a Mexican academic and entrepreneur of Lebanese descent (Boustani). His grandparents emigrated from Lebanon at the beginning of the 20th century, in the second period of Lebanese immigration to Mexico, and dedicated to commerce in hardware and the workwear clothing industry. On his mother's side, a family of notable scholars, mathematicians José Adem, es:Julián Adem, Alejandro Adem, Luis Casian Adem, physicist Esbaide Adem and cardiologist Abdo Bisteni Adem.

== Education ==
Bustani holds a bachelor's degree in chemical engineering from the Monterrey Institute of Technology and Higher Education (1976) and a doctorate degree (PhD) from the University of Sheffield (1987). His PhD thesis focused in studying the steam gasification of a reactive coke to produce synthesis gas, which involved the design and construction of a pressurized fluidized bed reactor at pilot plant scale.

== Career ==
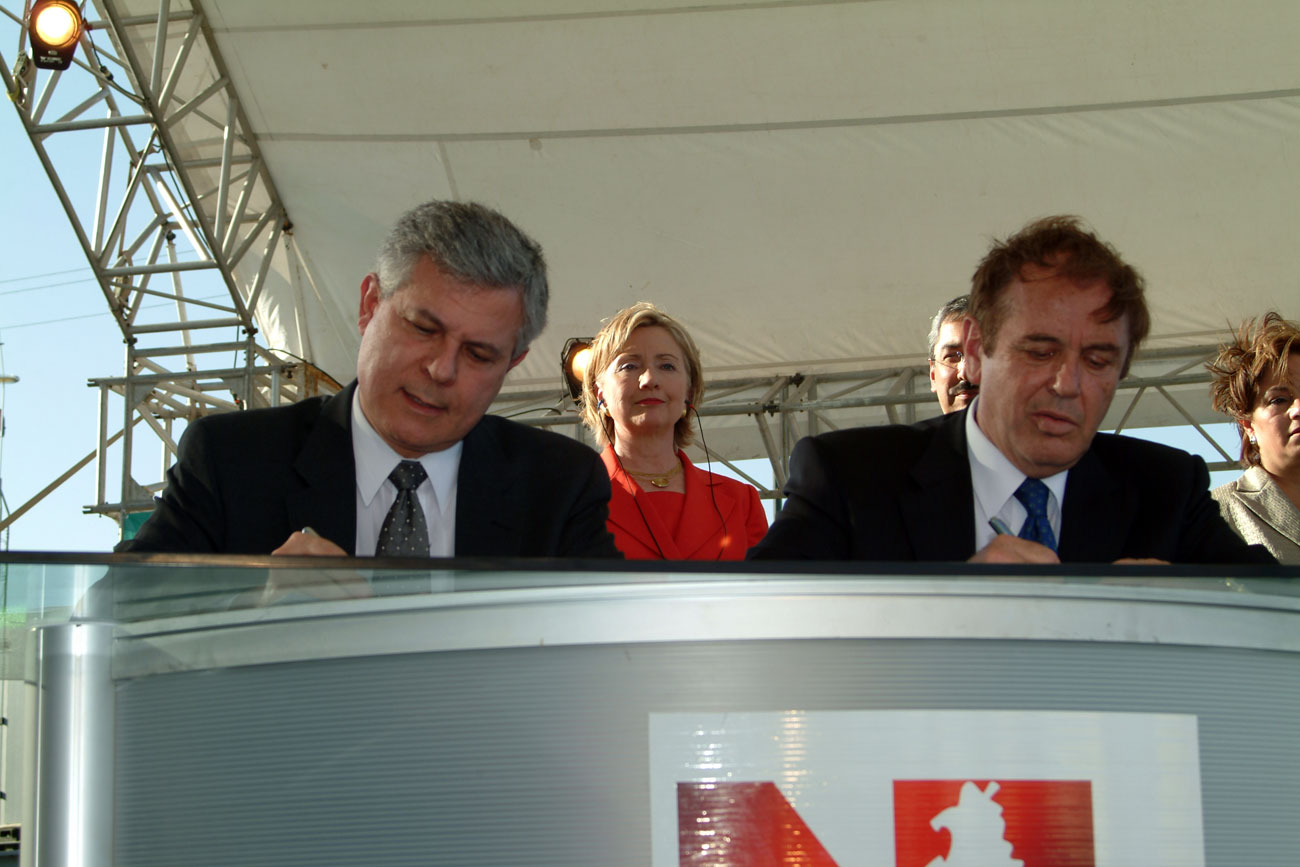
U.S. Secretary of State Hillary Rodham Clinton during a signing ceremony marking an agreement between the Autonomous University of Nuevo Leon, the Monterrey Institute of Technology and the University of Texas to investigate alternate sources of energy in Monterrey, Mexico March 26, 2009. To the left, Alberto Bustani, then rector of the main campus of Monterrey Institute of Technology.

He worked for 25 years at Tecnologico de Monterrey (Monterrey Institute of Technology and Higher Education), where he held different academic and administrative positions (1987 to 2012).He was President of the main campus of Tecnologico de Monterrey (Monterrey Institute of Technology and Higher Education) from 2001 to 2010.

He was a member of the advisory board of WWF Mexico, a branch of World Wide Fund for Nature, from 2004 to 2015.

== Research ==
From 1979 to 1983 Bustani worked in research and development for HYL (now TENOVA HYL of Techint Group), then a subsidiary of HYLSA (es:Ternium Hylsa), a steel company based in Monterrey, Nuevo León, Mexico in the area of direct reduction of iron ores. During this time he was awarded with a patent of a direct reduction process.

In 1998, he worked in the development of the Vehicle End-of-Life Model (VEOL) used to analyze the trends in the automotive industry in the United States, and the recycling rates of vehicles overtime by tracking twenty-four different materials and twenty-six assemblies.

In 2000, he analyzed the controversy surrounding the North American Free Trade Agreement (NAFTA) centered on issues that seem not to be directly related with trade itself, such as its impact on the environment, labor, worker health and safety, and immigration. The results were presented in April 2000 at the Call to Action issued on the authority of The Aspen Institute and its Program on Energy, the Environment, and the Economy.

In June 1996, the NAFTA Commission for Environmental Cooperation retained

In 1997 he was part of the NAFTA Commission for Environmental Cooperation (CEC) policy group who assisted the CEC Secretariat in developing a North American agenda for the control of air and marine pollution and develop recommendations regarding transboundary and long-range transport of air pollutants

He studied the problem created in Mexico in the 1980s when a shift from natural gas to heavy fuel oil in industrial processes increased emissions of air pollutants significantly, and later in the 1990s the benefits of substituting leaded for unleaded gasoline

He is author of section 1 of the report "The Fundamentals of Gasification and its Technology" developed for The Watt Committee on Energy Working Group on Gasification and published in 1989.

=== Monterrey Institute of Technology and Higher Education ===
He was President of the main campus of Tecnologico de Monterrey (Monterrey Institute of Technology and Higher Education) from 2001 to 2010. During his tenure he implemented a knowledge-based research grant system ("Cátedras de Investigación").

== Views and opinions ==
He was a strong advocate of student internationalization and the creation of multicultural communities. He presented his perspectives on this at the Association of International Education Administrators (AIEA) in March 2013.

In 2001 he supported an initiative at the university called the "Sustainable Campus Program", which was developed to encompass a wider, more inclusive view of sustainable development in the teaching, learning, research, outreach and operational activities of the Monterrey Campus.

In 2002, he participated in the working group “The challenge to academia: preparing the next generation of leaders”, organized by The Alliance for Global Sustainability (AGS).

While at the university, Bustani also held the position of Dean of the School of Engineering and Architecture (1998–2001), Director of the Center for Environmental Quality (1992–1998) and Head of the Chemical Engineering Department (1987–1992).

Bustani also served as vice president for Planning and Academic Development at the Tecnologico de Monterrey System from 2011 to 2012.

== Awards and recognitions ==
The University of Sheffield granted him the Degree of Doctor in Engineering Honoris Causa in November 2005.

He was awarded the Romulo Garza Award Prize (Premio Romulo Garza) on teaching and research in Monterrey, Nuevo León, Mexico in 1992.

Bustani was the keynote speaker at Virginia Tech's graduate commencement ceremony on May 11, 2007, the school's first international commencement speaker.
