= Rayfoun =

Rayfoun ريفون
- Village
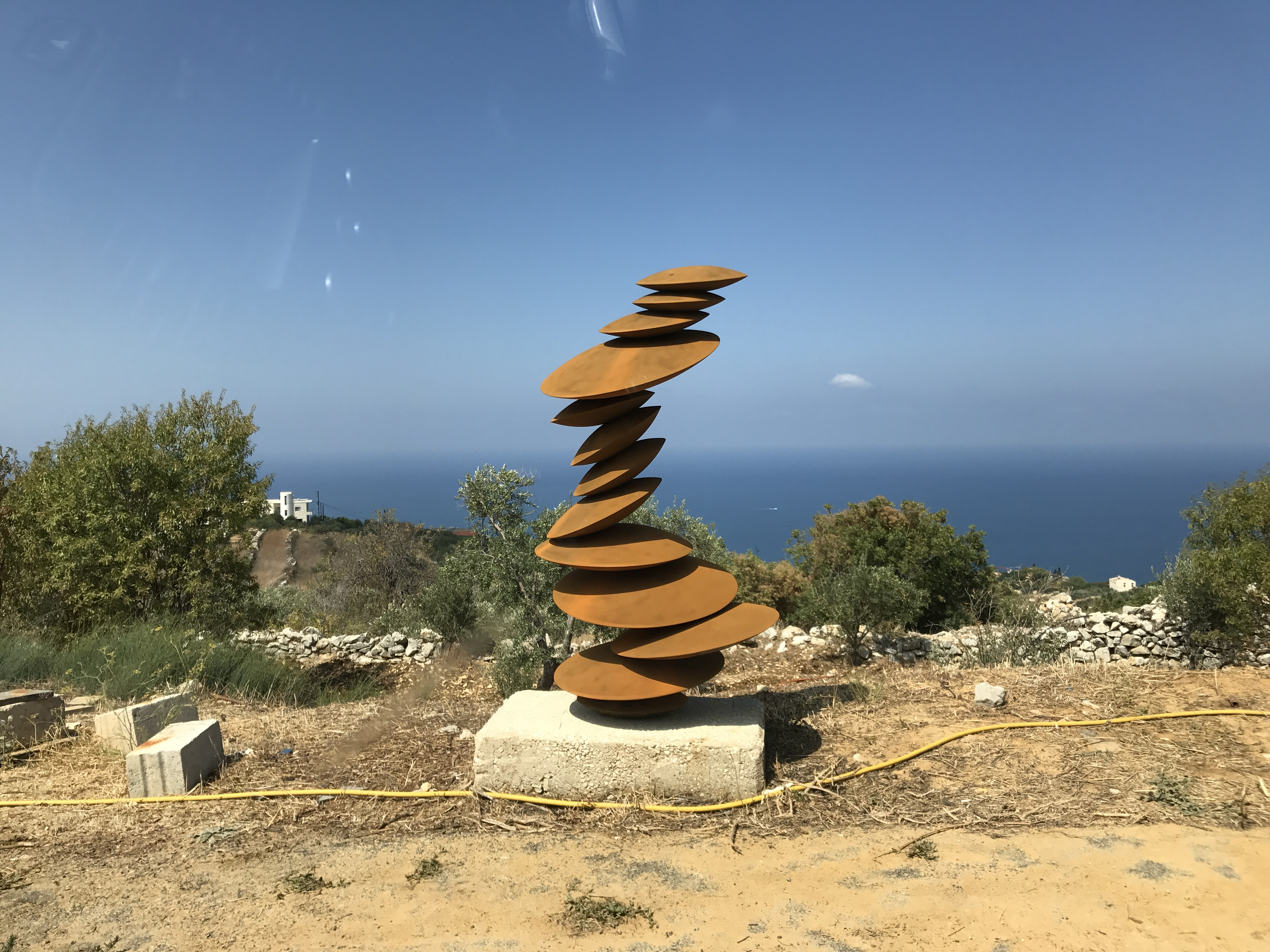
- sculpture by Anachar Basbous, in Rayfoun

- Location in Lebanon
- Coordinates: 33°58′52″N 35°42′11″E
- Country: Lebanon
- Governorate: Keserwan-Jbeil
- District: Keserwan

Government
  - Type: Municipality

Area
  - Total: 1.89 km^{2} (0.73 sq mi)
- Elevation: 1,050 m (3,440 ft)
- Time zone: UTC+2 (EET)
  - Summer (DST): UTC+3 (EEST)

Rayfoun (Arabic: ريفون, romanized: Rayfūn; also spelled Reifun or Raifoun) is a village and municipality located in the Keserwan District of the Keserwan-Jbeil Governorate of Lebanon. The village is about 28 kilometres (17 mi) north of Beirut. It has an average elevation of 1,050 meters above sea level and a total land area of 189 hectares. Rayfoun's inhabitants are predominantly Maronites. Rayfoun is the hometown of Maronite Patriarch Nasrallah Boutros Sfeir and the Ottoman-era peasant leader Tanyus Shahin.
