= Paul Peter Massad =

Head of the Maronite Church from 1854 to 1890

His Beatitude Paul I Peter Massad (بولس الأول بطرس مسعد)
- Patriarch of Antioch
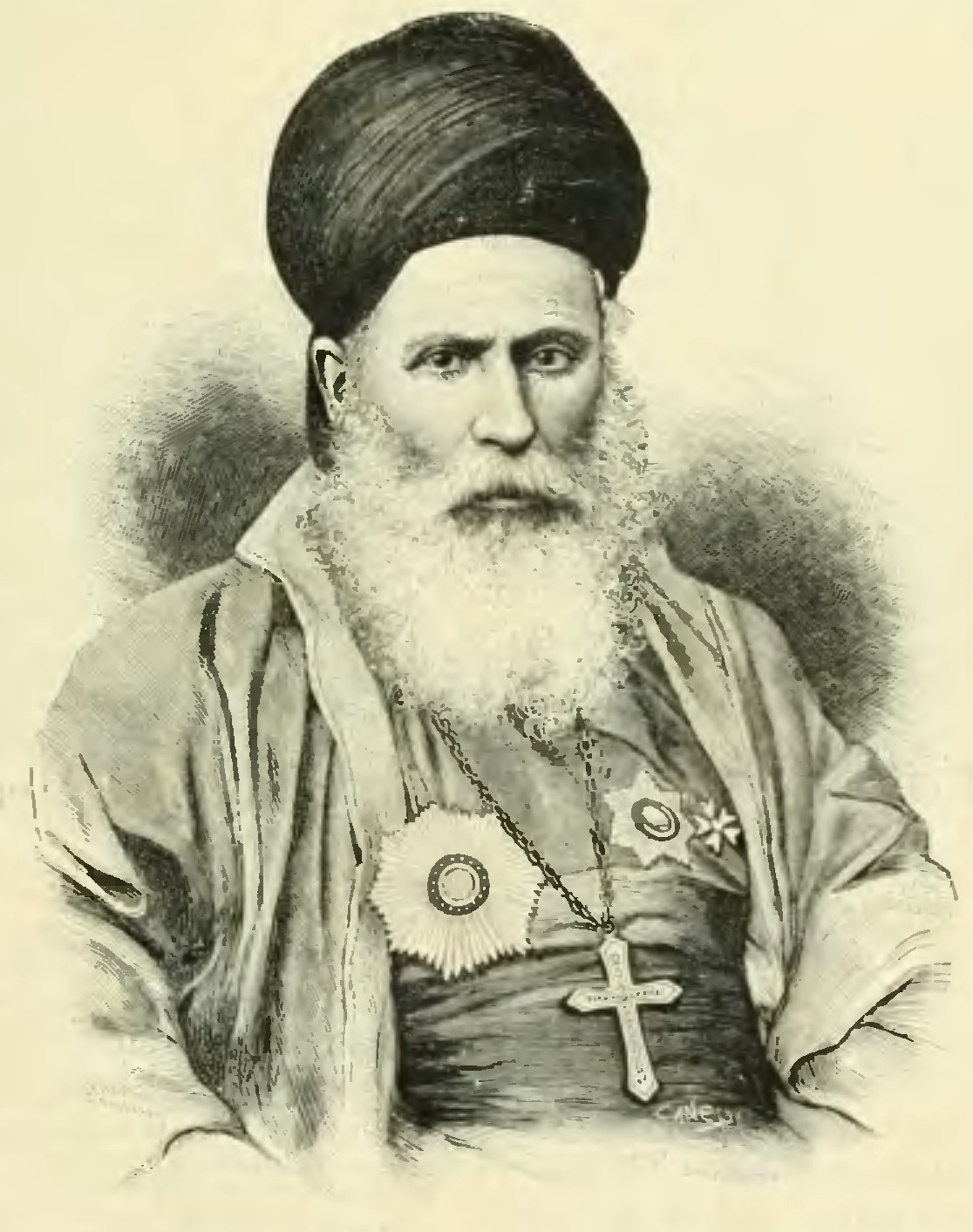
- Church: Maronite Church
- See: Patriarch of Antioch
- Elected: November 12, 1854
- Term ended: April 18, 1890
- Predecessor: Joseph Ragi El Khazen
- Successor: John Peter El Hajj

Orders
- Ordination: June 13, 1830 Priest)
- Consecration: March 28, 1841 (Bishop) by Joseph Peter Hobaish

Personal details
- Born: February 16, 1806 Ashqout, Lebanon
- Died: April 18, 1890 (aged 84) Bkerké, Lebanon

Paul I Peter Massad, or Boulos Boutros Massaad (also Mas'ad; Arabic: بولس الأول بطرس مسعد; 16 February 1806 – 18 April 1890) was the 70th Maronite Catholic Patriarch of Antioch from 1854 until his death in 1890.

== Life ==
Massad was born in the village of Ashqout in the Keserwan District, Lebanon, on February 16, 1806.

He studied in the seminary of 'Ain-Ourakat and later for seven years in the College of the Propaganda in Rome. After returning to Lebanon he became the secretary of Joseph Peter Hobaish, who ordained him as a Catholic priest on June 13, 1830.

Joseph Peter Hobaish consecrated Massad titular bishop of Tarsus on March 28, 1841, and appointed him as his own spiritual vicar. After Joseph Ragi El Khazen's death Massad was elected his successor as Maronite patriarch of Antioch on November 12, 1854 and confirmed on March 23, 1855, by Pope Pius IX.

Letter from Massad, 1841

In 1867 Massad traveled to Rome with a Maronite delegation that included the Archbishop of Tyre Pierre Bostani to attend the 1800th anniversary of the martyrdom of Saints Peter and Paul. He was the second Maronite Patriarch after Jeremy el-Amchiti (died 1230) to travel to Rome. Following Rome, he travelled to France where he asked Napoleon III for financial and political help for the Christians of Lebanon. Napoleon III gave him the French Legion of Honour. He then journeyed to Constantinople where he was received by Sultan Abdul-Aziz and presented with the Ottoman Order of the Medjidie. He did not personally participate in the First Vatican Council in 1869-1870, delegating the Archbishop of Tyre, Pierre Boustani, to head a delegation that also included the Archbishop of Beirut Tobia Aoun.

Massad fully established the Maronite Church within the Catholic Church while maintaining many of its own distinctive elements. He died on April 18, 1890, in the Maronite Catholic Patriarchate in Bkerké, Lebanon.

== Sources ==
- Pierre Dib, v. Maronite (Eglise), in the Dictionnaire de Theologie Catholique, Tome Dixième, première partie, Paris 1928, coll. 106-107.
