= Rmeileh =

Rmeileh الرميلة (الشوف)
- Village
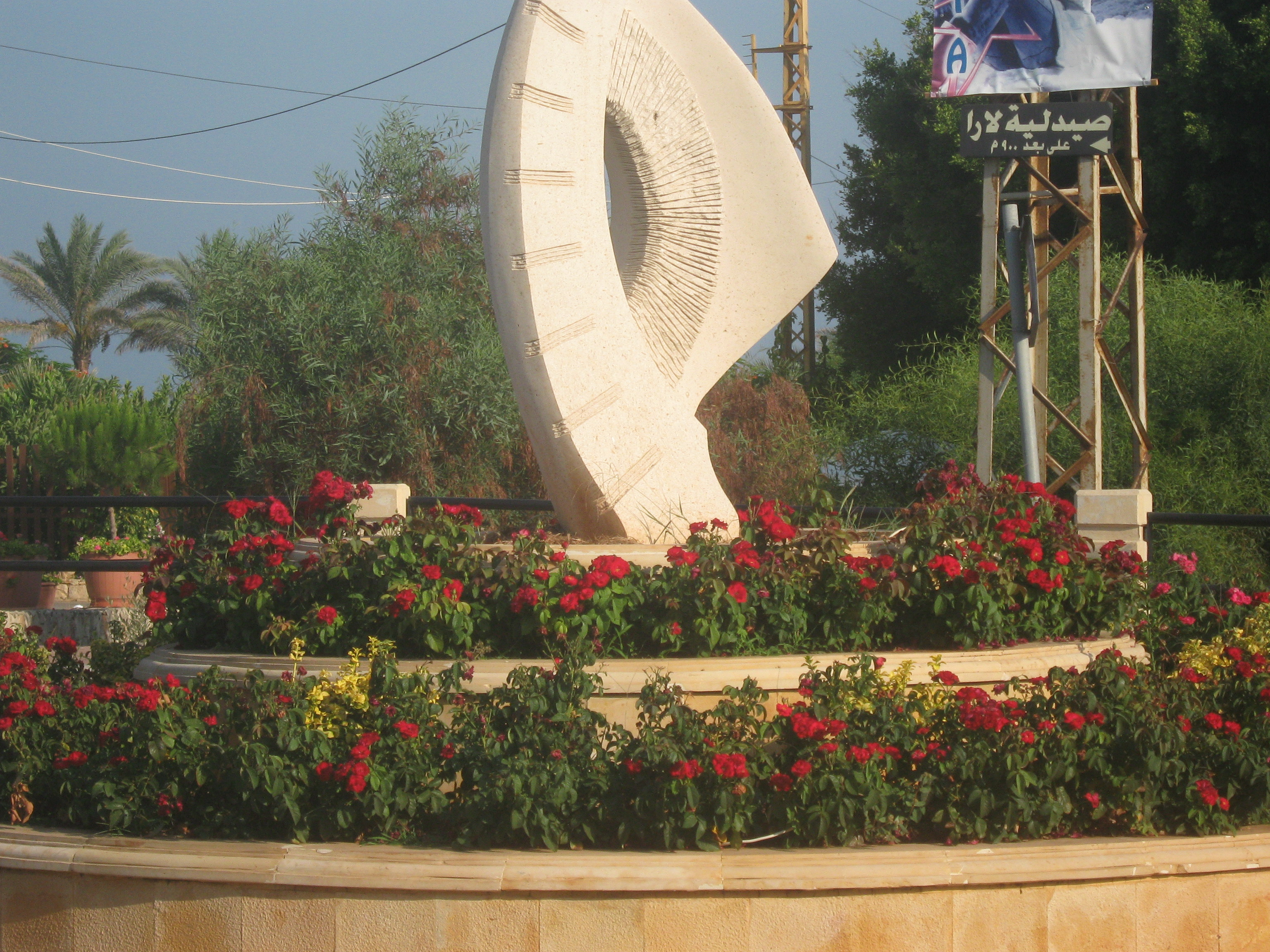
- Rmeileh

- Location within Lebanon
- Coordinates: 33°36′30″N 35°23′53″E
- Country: Lebanon
- Governorate: Mount Lebanon Governorate
- District: Chouf District
- Elevation: 80 m (260 ft)
- Time zone: UTC+2 (EET)
  - Summer (DST): UTC+3 (EEST)
- Dialing code: +961

Rmeileh (Levantine Arabic: الرميلة (الشوف), romanized: ar-Rmēleh (ash-Shūf)) is a Lebanese municipality in Chouf District, Mount Lebanon Governorate, Lebanon. The town belongs to the Federation of North Iqlim El Kharroub Municipalities.

== Geography ==
Rmeileh is located approximately 5.5 kilometres (3.4 mi) north of Sidon and 37 kilometres (23 mi) south of Lebanon's capital city, Beirut. It is 80 metres (260 ft) above sea level and covers an area of 544 hectares (1,340 acres). Rmeileh sits on hills close to the sea, by the Awali River. It is bordered to the south by the towns of Elman and Jamilla, to the east by Wardaniyeh town, and to the north by the town of Siblin.

== Etymology ==
Rmeileh most likely got its name from the nature and location of its sandy beach. In Greek, it is known as Polatamos, but in the Syriac language, the name is derived from the word Armela meaning "beach".

== History ==
Hill caves suggest a settlement on this site since earliest times. The ancient town of Rmeileh was located near the modern church.

Rmeileh has been important because of its proximity to Sidon. The town has been mentioned, as Palatamos, in conflicts between Antiochus III the Great and the Ptolemaic Kingdom.

In 1863, Ernest Renan found ruins of the ancient city. He found a "unique" 3.6 metres (12 ft) stone cut in the Egyptian style and stones spread throughout the town cut from sarcophagi from different eras. In a number of caves, excavators found pieces of pottery and tools. Glass and various currencies were found on the sandy beach by the town. The ancient walls were built of sandstone, and inside were broken mosaics. The discoveries at Rmeileh were similar to those in Jiyeh and Khaldeh, Sidon and Chehim.

== Demographics ==
The population of Rmeileh is about 3,300.

== Agriculture ==
Fruits and vegetables are grown, including almkhovh, olives, olive oil, citrus fruits, bananas, guava.

== Tourism of Rmeileh ==
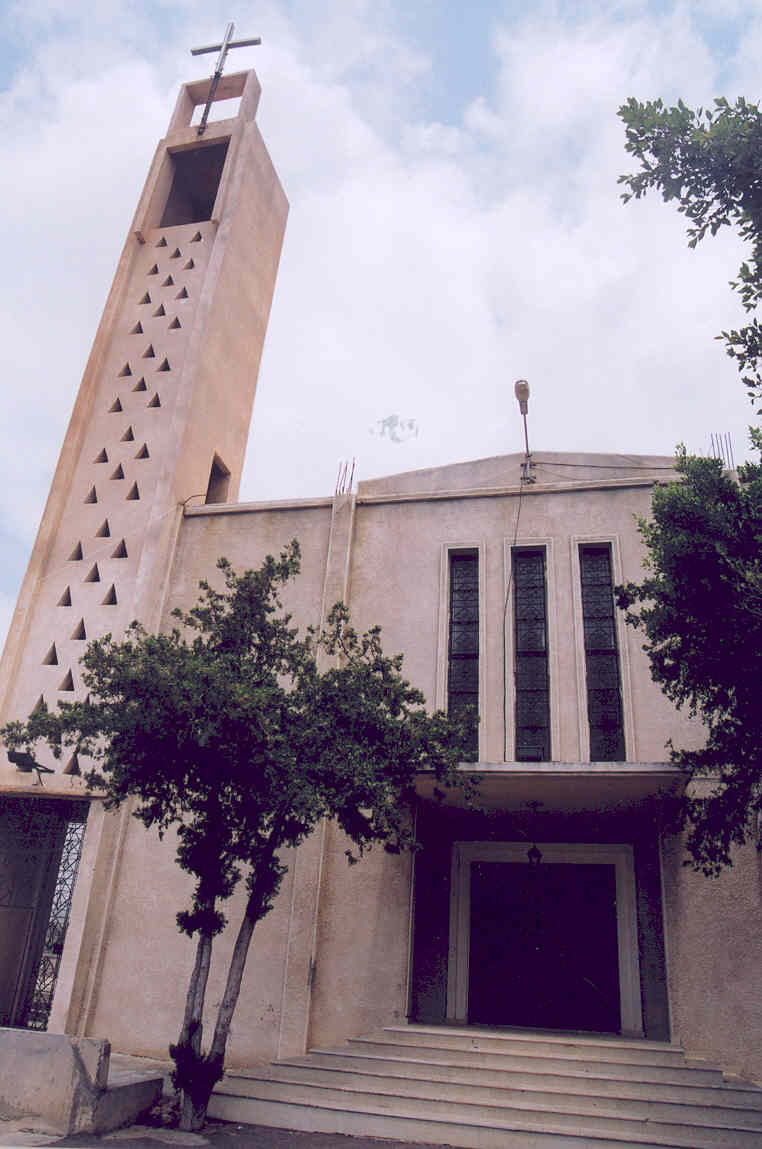

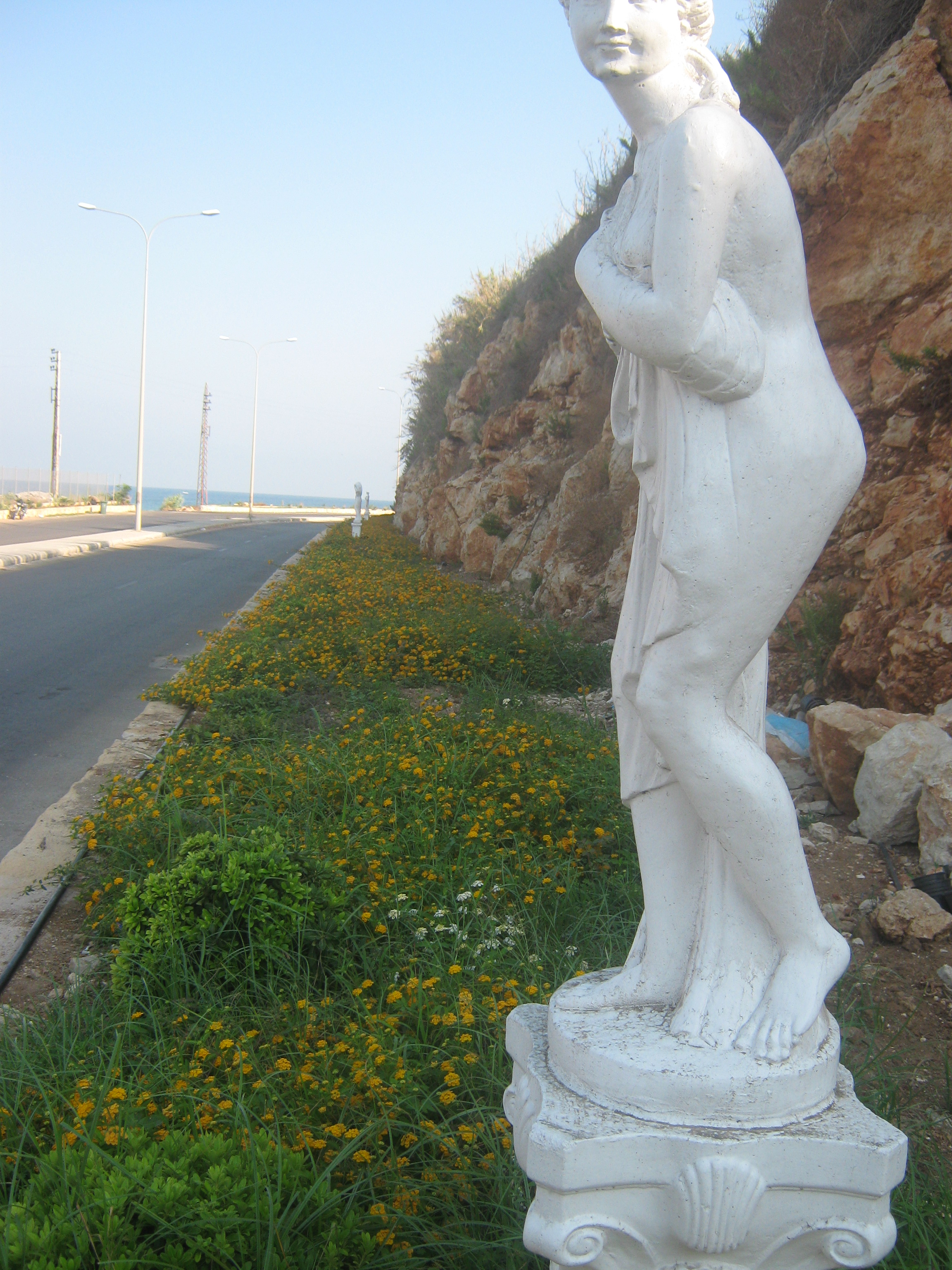

=== Archaeological sites ===
- The remains of the old town: the old town was located on a nearby hill, by the old church. Spread throughout the modern town are many sandy and rocky stones that were used in its construction, evidence of the ancient settlement existing on this hill and underneath modern buildings.
- Cemeteries: spread throughout the town and its environs is a large number of tombs carved in the rock, notably those near the modern church.

=== Religious sites ===
- Church of the Old City: Located to the east of the new church, this is a rectangular building 17 metres (56 ft) in length, 20 metres (66 ft) wide, and 12 metres (39 ft) high. In front of a small courtyard to the north is a small bell tower.
- Modern church: the Church of Saint Anthony the Great was built about fifty years ago. It is located in the center of town and is characterized by its large size and the beautiful icons that adorn it.
- Mar Elias shrine: Located in the southernmost part of the town, on the north bank of the river amid lemon groves and land cultivated with vegetables, it is a small room near a courtyard.

=== Natural features ===
- Beaufort cave: located near Gemmaiza spring, it is a large cave consisting of calcareous rocks.
- Gemmaiza spring: Located at the bottom of the valley, to the south of the town, near Nabah engraved rock, it is currently being restored as a tourist attraction.

== Notable people ==
- Georges Chaaya, Singer and Conductor of "Voice of Heaven Choir".
- Judge Tanios El-Khoury, Former president of the Supreme Judicial Council
