= Joseph Peter Hobaish =

Head of the Maronite Church from 1823 to 1845

His Excellency, The Most Reverend Joseph VIII Peter Hobaish (يوسف الثامن بطرس حبيش)
- Patriarch of Antioch
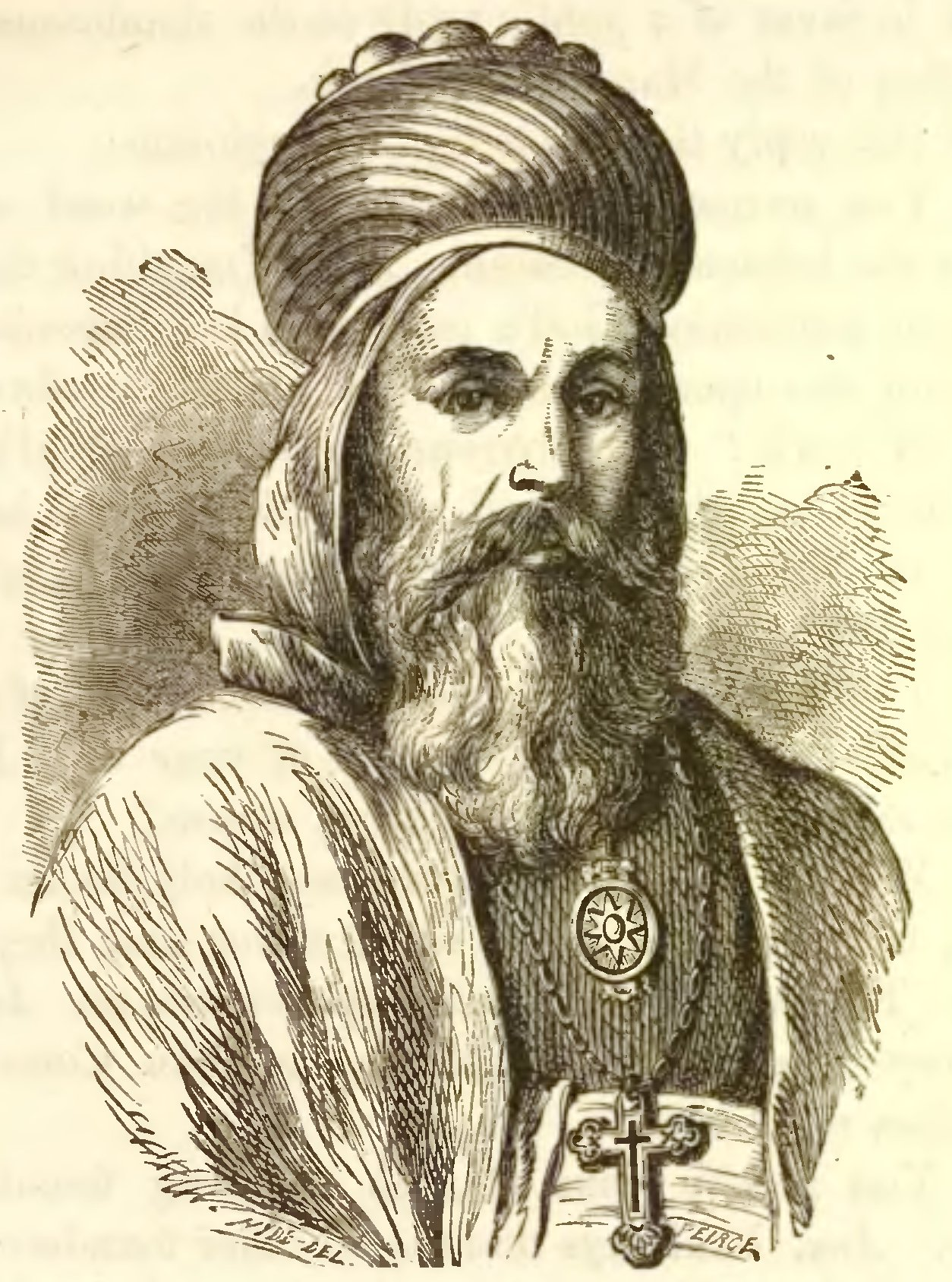
- Church: Maronite Church
- See: Patriarch of Antioch
- Elected: May 25, 1823
- Term ended: May 23, 1845
- Predecessor: John Helou
- Successor: Joseph Ragi El Khazen

Orders
- Consecration: January 30, 1820 (Bishop) by John Helou

Personal details
- Born: April 23, 1787 Sahel Aalma, Syria Vilayet, Ottoman Empire
- Died: May 23, 1845 (aged 58) Dimane, Syria Vilayet, Ottoman Empire

Joseph VIII Peter Hobaish (or Youssef Hobaish, Yusuf Hubaysh, Hubais, Hobeish, Hobaich; Arabic: يوسف الثامن بطرس حبيش; April 23, 1787–May 23, 1845) was the 68th Maronite Patriarch of Antioch from 1823 until his death in 1845.

He formerly served as the Maronite Catholic Bishop of Tripoli.

== Life ==
Joseph Peter Hobaish was born in the village of Sahel Aalma, near Jounieh, in the Keserwan District, Modern day Lebanon on April 23, 1787. He studied at the seminary of 'Ain Warqa and was ordained priest on June 26, 1814, and later he was consecrated Bishop of Tripoli on January 30, 1820, by Patriarch John Helou.

Patriarch John Helou died on May 12, 1823, and Joseph Peter Hobaish was elected Patriarch on May 25, 1823, by the patriarchal synod in the monastery of Santa Maria of Qannubin. On May 29, 1823, took place his ceremony of enthronement. Pope Leo XII confirmed his election on May 3, 1824, even if there were some canonical irregularities in the election detected by the Propaganda Fide: actually Hobaish didn't reach the two-thirds majority of votes, nor he was already forty.

As Patriarch, Joseph Hobaish urged improving the formation of priests. The Pontifical Maronite College in Rome no longer existed after 1808, but his attempts to reorganize it were unsuccessful. However popes Pius VIII and Gregory XVI were willing to accommodate students in the Maronite Pontifical Urban College. Hobaish thus reorganized the seminary 'Ain-Warka and opened two new seminaries, Mar 'Abda Harharaia in 1830 and Mar Sarsik et Bakhos in 1832. In 1840 he founded a religious congregation of missionaries. He introduced a modified liturgical ritual book which included many latinizations, and he took measures to limit the increasing Protestant missionary activity. Joseph Hobaish further definitively implemented two of the more controversial decrees of the Lebanese Council of 1736: the separation of monasteries where both men and women lived, and the definition of a fixed episcopal residence into each Maronite diocese.

Joseph Hobaish moved the Patriarchal residence from the Qannubin Monastery, located in the deep gorge of Kadisha Valley where his predecessors had resided almost continuously since 1440, and established two separate Patriarchal residences: the summer one at Bkerké near Jounieh and the winter one in the more accessible village of Dimane which overlooks the Kadisha Valley. Finally Hobaish put into effect one of the most controversial decisions of the synod of 1736 (confirmed by the Synod of 1818): the final separation between the monasteries and religious.

The years of his patriarchate were turbulent years for Lebanon, which suffered the invasion and occupation of Egypt from 1831 to 1840, and therefore became the arena of international conflicts that involved France, Britain, the Ottoman Empire, Austria, Prussia and other countries. The introduction of the double-Qaim maqamat, namely the division of Lebanon into two districts, one Druze and a Maronite, only served to exacerbate relations between the two sides, particularly in the years 1841–1845. Youssef Hobaish intervened several times to restore peace between the two souls of Lebanon, and his efforts earned him a special praise by Pope Gregory XVI.

Joseph Hobaish had a deep pastoral attitude, often visiting the parish churches of his country, instructing the priests, settling local quarrels and founding schools. He was highly estimated not only by his flock, but also by the Ottoman rulers.

While it was possible, Joseph Hobaish acted as an impartial arbiter between Druzes and Christians, but when Great Britain armed the Druzes against the Maronite peasants, he took a fierce position in unifying all the Christian population of Lebanon. The last years of Joseph Hobaish were saddened by the bloody events of the 1840-1845 attacks on the Christian population. Joseph Peter Hobaish died on May 23, 1845 at Dimane and was buried in the Qannubin Monastery.

== See also ==
- List of Maronite Patriarchs
- Maronite Church

== Sources ==
- Pierre Dib, v. Maronite (Eglise), https://archive.org/stream/dictionnairedet10pt1vaca#page/n59/mode/2up, Tome Dixième, première partie, Paris 1928, coll. 103–105.
- K. Rizk, Hobaish Joseph, in Dictionnaire d'histoire et de géographie ecclésiastiques, 24 (1993), pp. 698–699.
