= Dahr Safra =

Dahr Safra ضهر صفرا
- Village
- Location in Syria
- Coordinates: 35°4′45″N 35°55′38″E
- Country: Syria
- Governorate: Tartus
- District: Baniyas District
- Subdistrict: Rawda

Population (2004)
  - Total: 1,019
- Time zone: UTC+3 (EET)
  - Summer (DST): UTC+2 (EEST)
- City Qrya Pcode: C5379

Dahr Safra (Arabic: ضهر صفرا) is a village in the northwestern Syria, administratively part of the Baniyas District of Tartous Governorate. According to the Syria Central Bureau of Statistics (CBS), Dahr Safra had a population of 1,019 in the 2004 census. Its inhabitants are Maronite Christians.

== Geography ==
Dahr Safra is about 15 kilometers (9.3 mi) south of the district capital of Baniyas. The village is largely built on the Mediterranean coastal plain, while its old core sits on the basalt plateau above it.

== Historical overview ==
Historically, like many of the surrounding villages of the Syrian Coastal Mountain Range, its lands were characterized by olive groves on its slopes, wheat fields on the plateau, pasturelands for sheep on the coastal plain and vineyards scattered along the slopes or growing on the trellises of the village houses and harvested for arak production.

In the 1950s some farmers from the village who had taken up work in Lebanon introduced motorized pumps to Dahr Safra's agriculture and replaced the grain and lentils grown on the village's largely barren coastal plain with market gardening. As this type of agriculture was more demanding than tending the olive groves and wheat fields of the hill and slopes, the farmers working this venture settled down on the plain. By the 1980s, there were seldom any barren fields left in the plain and most of Dahr Safra's population relocated there from the plateau.

In the 1990s, the farmers of Dahr Safra, once again through their contact with Lebanese agriculture, pioneered plasticulture in the Syrian coastal plain, such that the length of the plains between Baniyas and Tartus were covered with plastic shelters within the span of a decade, helped along by Syria's Bank of Agriculture providing loans for half the costs of shelters. Significant profits were derived in particular from the offseason cultivation of tomatoes and cucumbers. The plasticulture boom developed the commercial economy of the village, with garages, warehouses, restaurants, and shops springing up on the plain near the coastal highway.
