= Nora Boustany =

Lebanese journalist and educator

Nora Naaman Boustany is a Lebanese-American journalist and educator known for her coverage of the Middle East and human rights issues.

Boustany worked for United Press International in Lebanon for two years following her graduate school education. She had trouble getting a job in journalism initially in the 1970s because, as she was told by editors, she didn't have any experience and "they didn’t hire women." She created a role for herself being a local expert, assisting well-known American and British correspondents who were in Beirut on short-term assignments.

Boustany began freelancing for the Washington Post starting in 1979. She was hired on as staff in 1988 at a time when many foreign correspondents had left Beirut for fear of being kidnapped. In this situation, being female helped her, as she explained "It was believed...that it was safer for women because Islamic groups did not want to come in contact with females in a situation of captivity. We had tremendous access." At the Post, she covered Lebanon’s war, Desert Storm, and the upheavals and struggles in Gaza and Algeria from her location in Beirut. She was a correspondent in Algeria, Libya, Saudi Arabia, Yemen, Kuwait, Iraq and Iran, speaking four languages: English; Arabic; French; and German. She wrote a column, Diplomatic Dispatches, about Washington's diplomatic community, that was published twice weekly.

She won the George Polk Award for Foreign Reporting in 1987 for her coverage of the plight of Palestinian refugees in Lebanon. In 1992, she received a Distinguished Service award from the University of Wisconsin at Madison's School of Journalism and Mass Communication. She left the Washington Post in 2008 after a nearly 30-year career, taking an early retirement package when the Post cut its staffing by 10%.

She was a Writer-in-Residence Fellow for the year 2009-2010 at the Issam Fares Institute for Public Policy and International Affairs at the American University of Beirut. She currently teaches journalism at the American University of Beirut. She serves on the board of directors of the Beirut Museum of Art.

== Early life and education ==
Boustany grew up in Beirut and has a twin sister and a brother. She graduated from the American University of Beirut in 1975. She earned her M.A. in Journalism from the University of Missouri in 1976. She lives in Beirut.
