= Desmond Penigar =

American basketball player

Personal information
- Born: July 16, 1981 (age 45) DeQuincy, Louisiana, U.S.
- Listed height: 6 ft 7 in (2.01 m)
- Listed weight: 245 lb (111 kg)

Career information
- High school: Upland (Upland, California)
- College: Ventura College (1999–2001); Utah State (2001–2003)
- NBA draft: 2003: undrafted
- Playing career: 2003–2016
- Position: Power forward
- Number: 26

Career history
- 2003–2004: Asheville Altitude
- 2004: Orlando Magic
- 2004–2005: Changwon LG Sakers
- 2005–2007: EWE Baskets Oldenburg
- 2009–2011: Panthers Fürstenfeld
- 2012–2013: Al Kuwait
- 2013–2013: Al-Hilal
- 2014–2015: Sagesse
- 2015–2016: Tadamon Zouk

Career highlights
- NBDL champion (2004); All-NBDL First Team (2004); NBDL Rookie of the Year (2004); 2× First-team All-Big West (2002, 2003)
- Stats at NBA.com
- Stats at Basketball Reference

Desmond Penigar (born July 16, 1981) is an American former professional basketball player. A 6'7" tall power forward, he attended Utah State University and Ventura College. Penigar was a member of the Orlando Magic of the National Basketball Association during the 2003–04 NBA season. As a member of the Asheville Altitude, he won the 2003–04 National Basketball Development League Rookie of the Year award.

He has played professionally in South Korea, Germany, Austria, Lebanon, Kuwait and Saudi Arabia.

== Professional awards and achievements ==
- NBDL Rookie of the Year -04
- All-NBDL 1st Team -04
- NBDL Regular Season Champion -04
- NBDL Champion -04
- Austrian Bundesliga A All-Star Game -09
- Eurobasket.com All-Austrian Bundesliga Imports Team -09
- Eurobasket.com All-Austrian Bundesliga 1st Team -09, 10
- Austrian Bundesliga A Semifinals -09
- Austrian Supercup Winner -09
- Austrian A Bundesliga All-Star Game -10
- Eurobasket.com Austrian Bundesliga All-Imports Team -10
- Austrian Bundesliga A Finalist -10
- Austrian Bundesliga A Regular Season Champion -10
- Asia-Basket.com All-Lebanese League 1st Team -12
- Asia-Basket.com Lebanese League All-Imports Team -12
- Asia-Basket.com Lebanese League All-Defensive Team -12
- Kuwait Federation Cup Winner -13
- Kuwait League Regular Season Champion -13

== College and high school awards and achievements ==
- HS first-team all-league and all-county selection -98,99
- JUCO runner-up player of the year in the state of California -00,01
- JUCO first-team all-conference and all-state selection -00,01
- Big West Conference Regular Season Champion -02 (Utah State)
- Big West Conference Tournament Finalist -02 (Utah State)
- All-Big West Conference 1st Team -02,03
- Big West Tournament Champion -03
- Big West All-Tournament Team -03
