= Dik El Mehdi =

Dik El Mehdi ديك المحدي
- City
- Location within Lebanon
- Coordinates: 33°55′49.8″N 35°37′20.6″E
- Country: Lebanon
- Governorate: Mount Lebanon Governorate
- District: Matn District
- Time zone: UTC+2 (EET)
  - Summer (DST): UTC+3 (EEST)
- Dialing code: +961

Dik El Mehdi (Arabic: ديك المحدي, romanized: Dīk al-Meḥdī) is a village, at 325 meters elevation, in the Matn District governorate of Mount Lebanon. Its population has been estimated at 2,096 by Aayroun. The village is around 18 km. from Beirut. The majority of it inhabitants derives from the Ashkar family. Its inhabitants are almost predominantly Maronite Catholic.

Dik el Mehdi has an elementary, high and secondary school "Collège des Frères Maristes Champville".
