= Augustin Bostani =

Agustin Bostani (29 November 1876 in Dair al-Qamar, Lebanon – 30 October 1957) was an eparch of the Maronite Catholic Eparchy of Sidon.

On 20 April 1899 Bostani was ordained to the priesthood. On 23 February 1919 he was appointed Eparch of Sidon and on 2 March 1919 the Maronite Patriarch of Antioch Elias Peter Hoayek consecrated him bishop. Bostani was Eparch of Sidon more than 38 years and died on 30 October 1957 at the age of 80.
