= Ashqout =

Ashqout عشقوت
- Municipality
- Location within Lebanon
- Coordinates: 33.987353°N 35.707626°E
- Country: Lebanon
- Governorate: Keserwan-Jbeil
- District: Keserwan

Area
  - Total: 7.88 km^{2} (3.04 sq mi)
- Elevation: 1,250 m (4,100 ft)
- Time zone: UTC+2 (EET)
  - Summer (DST): UTC+3 (EEST)
- Dialing code: +961

Ashqout (Arabic: عشقوت, romanized: ʿAshqūt; also spelled Ashkout, Achqout, `Ashqut) is a town and municipality in the Keserwan District of the Keserwan-Jbeil Governorate of Lebanon. It is located 31 kilometers north of Beirut. Ashqout's average elevation is 1,000 meters above sea level and its total land area is 588 hectares. Its inhabitants are predominantly Maronite Catholic, with Christians from other denominations in the minority.

Ottoman tax records indicate Ashqout had 43 Christian households in 1523, 43 Christian households and seven bachelors in 1530, and 33 Christian households and 14 bachelors in 1543.

Ashqout was inflicted by the Great Famine of Mount Lebanon. In January 1916, more than 30 people died in Ashqout and the nearby Harissa.

The town has three schools, one public and two private, in the town, with a total of 739 students as of 2008. The El-Hajj Hospital, which has 28 beds, is located in Ashqout. It is the birthplace of Ahmad Faris Shidyaq (1804–1887); Paul Peter Massad (1806–1890); and Rayyane Tabet (born 1983).

== Bibliography ==
- Bakhit, Muhammad Adnan Salamah (February 1972). The Ottoman Province of Damascus in the Sixteenth Century (PhD). School of Oriental and African Studies, University of London.
