= Dimane =

Village in North Governorate of Lebanon

Dimane الديمان
- Village
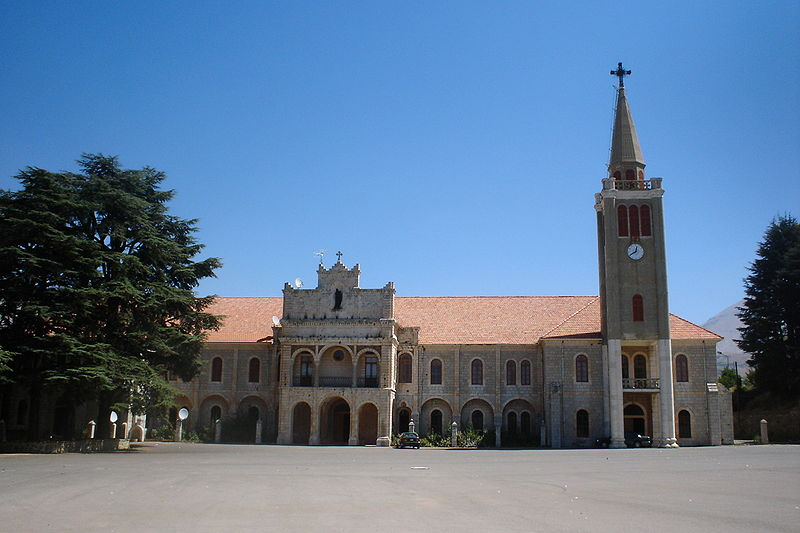
- The Maronite Patriarch summer residence, located in Dimane.

- Location within Lebanon
- Coordinates: 34°15′0″N 35°57′0″E
- Country: Lebanon
- Governorate: North Governorate
- District: Bsharri District
- Elevation: 1,400 m (4,600 ft)
- Time zone: UTC+2 (EET)
  - Summer (DST): UTC+3 (EEST)
- Dialing code: +961

Dimane or Diman (Arabic: الديمان, romanized: ad-Dīmān) is a mountainous village in the Bsharri District of the North Governorate of Lebanon. It sits at approximately 1400 m above sea level, overlooking the Kadisha Valley.

The inhabitants of Dimane are Lebanese and are followers of the Maronite Catholic Church. Its patron saint is Saint Joseph and his feast day is celebrated on 19 March each year.

== Summer Patriarchal residence ==
The village is the summer residence of the Maronite Patriarch, currently Mar Béchara Pierre Raï. The foundation stone for the current Patriarchal residence was laid on 28 September 1899.

== Landmarks ==
Dimane is also known for the "Garden of the Patriarchs", located in the west end of the village, and for the ancient footpath which starts behind the village's parish church, Saint John Maroun, and leads to the bottom of the Kadisha Valley where the Maronites headed by their Patriarch took refuge for centuries after the Arab Muslim invasions in the seventh century.

== Demographics ==
In 2014 Christians made up 99.92% of registered voters in Dimane. 97.39% of the voters were Maronite Catholics.

== Photo gallery ==
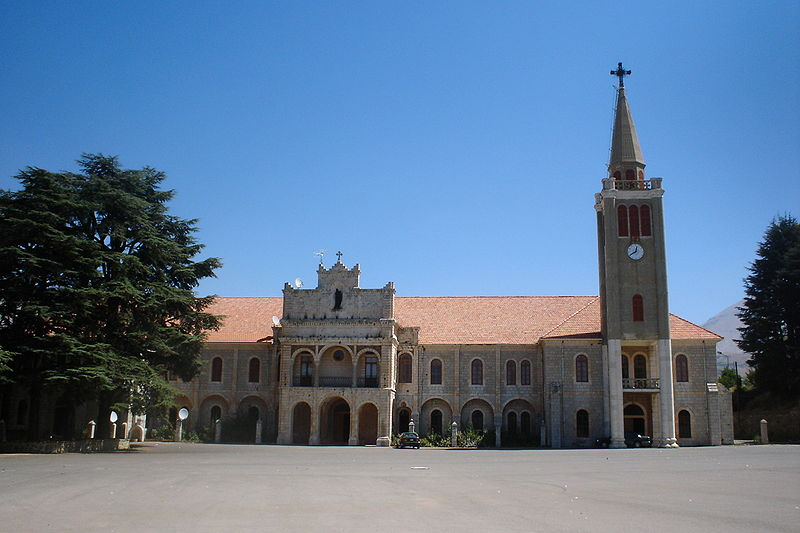
The Maronite Patriarch summer residence, located in Dimane.

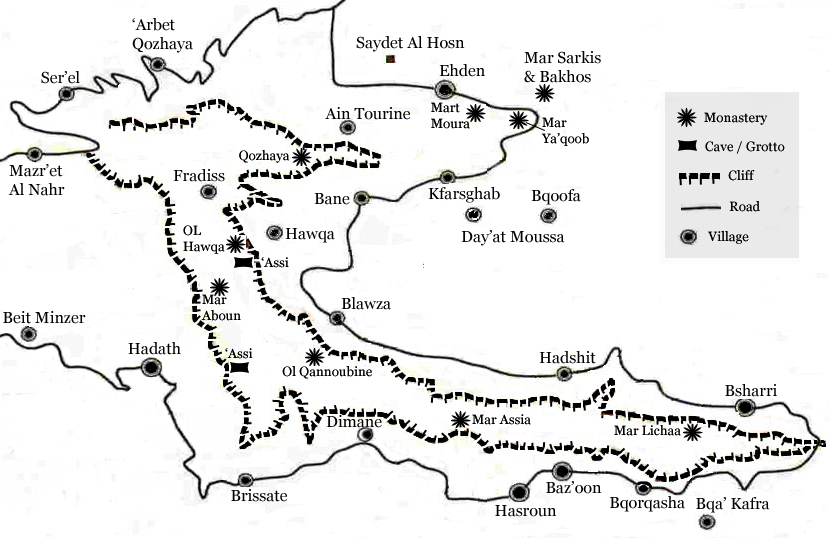
Location of main sites in the Kadisha Valley.
