= 2011 FIBA Asia Champions Cup squads =

The following is the list of squads for each of the 10 clubs competing in the 2011 FIBA Asia Champions Cup, held in Pasig, Philippines between May 28 to June 5, 2011. Final squads are subject to the approval of the event's technical committee. Each club has 15 players for the competition including a prerogative to tap two imports for their teams. A number of former National Basketball Association players and draftees such as Samaki Walker, Marcus Douthit, and Loren Woods, to name a few, will compete in the tournament.

== Group A ==
=== Al-Ittihad Jeddah ===
Head coach: (Serbia) Ninad Krazdic

#	Pos	Name	Date of birth	Height	Club
4	F	Darren Keely	August 28, 1978 (age 33)	6'4" (195)	(Saudi Arabia) Al-Ittihad Jeddah
5	F	Yahya Ibrahim	December 13, 1980 (age 31)	6'4" (195)	(Saudi Arabia) Al-Ittihad Jeddah
6	G	Adil Aljuhani	September 11, 1970 (age 41)	6'2" (189)	(Saudi Arabia) Al-Ittihad Jeddah
7	G	Jaber Kabe	March 9, 1985 (age 26)	5'10" (182)	(Saudi Arabia) Al-Ittihad Jeddah
8	F	Jaber Alshamrani	June 27, 1981 (age 30)	6'2" (187)	(Saudi Arabia) Al-Ittihad Jeddah
9	G	Omran Alflatahi	March 9, 1989 (age 22)	5'9" (180)	(Saudi Arabia) Al-Ittihad Jeddah
10	F	Aiman Almadani	May 17, 1987 (age 24)	6'3" (202)	(Saudi Arabia) Al-Ittihad Jeddah
11	F	Ahmed Alhosawi	June 23, 1984 (age 27)	6'6" (200)	(Saudi Arabia) Al-Ittihad Jeddah
12	G	Mohamed Alharbi	February 18, 1975 (age 36)	5'9" (179)	(Saudi Arabia) Al-Ittihad Jeddah
13	F	Fahad Alqonisi	November 12, 1981 (age 30)	6'2" (189)	(Saudi Arabia) Al-Ittihad Jeddah
14	C	Vladislav Dragojlović	June 3, 1979 (age 32)	6'10" (207)	(Saudi Arabia) Al-Ittihad Jeddah
15	F	Ali Almaghrabi	January 5, 1975 (age 36)	6'7" (200)	(Saudi Arabia) Al-Ittihad Jeddah

=== ASU Sports ===
Head coach: (Nigeria) Fredrick Oniga

#	Pos	Name	Date of birth	Height	Club
4	G	Osama Daghles	September 18, 1979 (age 32)	6'5" (198)	(China) Shanxi Zhongyu
5	G	Nedal Al-Sharif	January 13, 1982 (age 29)	6'1" (185)	(Jordan) ASU Sports
6	F	Zaid Abbas	November 21, 1983 (age 28)	6'7" (203)	(China) Beijing Ducks
7	F	Ahmed Al Hamarsheh	October 10, 1986 (age 25)	6'4" (196)	(Jordan) ASU Sports
8	F	Enver Soobzokov	May 16, 1978 (age 33)	6'6" (201)	(Jordan) ASU Sports
9	F	Ryan Forehan-Kelly	June 14, 1980 (age 31)	6'7" (205)	(Japan) Aisin Seahorses
10	C	Abdullah Abuqoura	May 30, 1984 (age 27)	6'7" (204)	(Jordan) ASU Sports
11	G	Wesam Al-Sous	February 24, 1983 (age 28)	6'2" (189)	(Jordan) ASU Sports
12	F	Mohammad Hadrab	June 11, 1984 (age 27)	6'7" (203)	(Jordan) ASU Sports
13	G	Mousa Al-Awadi	July 20, 1985 (age 26)	6'3" (192)	(Jordan) ASU Sports
14	F	Islam Abbas	March 11, 1980 (age 26)	6'6" (201)	(Jordan) ASU Sports
15	C	Jameel Watkins	February 8, 1977 (age 34)	6'10" (208)	(China) Jilin Tigers

=== KL Dragons ===
Head coach: (Philippines) Ariel Vanguardia

#	Pos	Name	Date of birth	Height	Club
4	G	Yeow Loong Ho	May 6, 1988 (age 23)	5'10" (178)	(Malaysia) KL Dragons
5	G	Guganeswaran Batumalai	May 26, 1982 (age 29)	5'11" (180)	(Malaysia) KL Dragons
6	G	Chuan Chin Weei	May 25, 1984 (age 27)	5'11" (180)	(Malaysia) KL Dragons

=== Smart Gilas ===
Head coach: (Serbia) Rajko Toroman

#	Pos	Name	Date of birth	Height	Club
PG	4	Andy Barroca (c)	25 – 25 April 1986	1.78 m (5 ft 10 in)	Smart Gilas Pilipinas	(Philippines)
PF	5	Aldrech Ramos	25 – 3 April 1986	2.01 m (6 ft 7 in)	Smart Gilas Pilipinas	(Philippines)
PG	6	J.V. Casio	24 – 1 September 1986	1.80 m (5 ft 11 in)	Smart Gilas Pilipinas	(Philippines)
SG	7	Dylan Ababou	24 – 7 December 1986	1.93 m (6 ft 4 in)	Smart Gilas Pilipinas	(Philippines)
PF	8	Japeth Aguilar	24 – 25 January 1987	2.06 m (6 ft 9 in)	Smart Gilas Pilipinas	(Philippines)
C	9	Greg Slaughter	22 – 19 May 1988	2.13 m (7 ft 0 in)	Smart Gilas Pilipinas	(Philippines)
SF	10	Mac Baracael	26 – 14 April 1985	1.93 m (6 ft 4 in)	Smart Gilas Pilipinas	(Philippines)
C	11	Marcus Douthit	31 – 18 April 1980	2.11 m (6 ft 11 in)	Smart Gilas Pilipinas	(Philippines)
C	12	Jason Ballesteros	25 – 7 October 1985	2.03 m (6 ft 8 in)	Smart Gilas Pilipinas	(Philippines)
SF	13	Chris Lutz	26 – 11 February 1985	1.90 m (6 ft 3 in)	Smart Gilas Pilipinas	(Philippines)
SF	14	Marcio Lassiter	23 – 16 May 1987	1.88 m (6 ft 2 in)	Smart Gilas Pilipinas	(Philippines)
PF	15	Kelly Williams	29 – 7 February 1982	2.01 m (6 ft 7 in)	Talk N Text Phone Pals	(Philippines)
PG	16	Jimmy Alapag	33 – 30 December 1977	1.75 m (5 ft 9 in)	Talk N Text Phone Pals	(Philippines)
SG	17	Chris Tiu (c)	25 – 15 July 1985	1.80 m (5 ft 11 in)	Smart Gilas Pilipinas	(Philippines)
C	18	Asi Taulava	38 – 2 March 1973	2.06 m (6 ft 9 in)	Powerade Tigers	(Philippines)
SG	19	Dondon Hontiveros	33 – 1 June 1977	1.88 m (6 ft 2 in)	Barako Bull Energy	(Philippines)
