= 2011 FIBA Asia Champions Cup =

22nd Asia Champions Cup
- Official logo

Tournament details
- Host country: Philippines
- Dates: May 28 – June 5
- Teams: 10 (from 44 federations)
- Venue: 1 (in 1 host city)

Final positions
- Champions: Lebanon (Al Riyadi's 1st title; Lebanon's 4th title)

Tournament statistics
- MVP: (Lebanon) Fadi El Khatib
- Top scorer: (United Arab Emirates) Fields (24.8)
- Top rebounds: (Saudi Arabia) Dragajlovic (12.1)
- Top assists: (Jordan) Daghlas (6.1)

Official website
- 2011 FIBA Asia Champions Cup

The FIBA Asia Champions Cup 2011 was the 22nd staging of the FIBA Asia Champions Cup, the basketball club tournament of FIBA Asia. The tournament was held in Pasig, Philippines from May 28 to June 5, 2011. The event is co-organized by the Samahang Basketbol ng Pilipinas and FIBA Asia.

Al Riyadi from Lebanon, after going undefeated in the entire tournament, won its first ever Fiba Asia Champions Cup title after defeating Mahram Tehran from Iran in the final game. It was the fourth time a club from Lebanon has won the championship.

Al-Rayyan from Qatar, on the other hand, finished third in the tournament after defeating Smart Gilas from the Philippines in the third-place game.

== Bid ==
The Samahang Basketbol ng Pilipinas (SBP) originally wanted to host the 2011 FIBA Asia Championship, which was the qualifying tournament in Asia for the men's basketball event of the 2012 Summer Olympics, after reports circulated that FIBA was planning to remove the hosting rights of the tournament from Beirut, Lebanon.

SBP, the national sport association for basketball in the Philippines, lost its bid to host the Asian Championships, and the hosting rights was awarded to Wuhan, China. Nevertheless, FIBA Asia offered the FIBA Asia Champions Cup, the Asian club championship, of the same year to the country. Newly appointed SBP executive director Sonny Barrios, who replaced Noli Eala, said that he considers the hosting of the 22nd FIBA Asia Champions Cup as one of his priorities as SBP's top executive. Barrios, a former commissioner of the Philippine Basketball Association, said that, “The name of the country is at stake here so we have to make sure that everything runs smoothly.”

It was the third time that the Philippines hosted the event. The last FIBA Asia event that the country hosted was the 2005 FIBA Asia Champions Cup. In welcoming the country as the host of the tournament, FIBA Asia president Sheikh Saud bin Ali Al-Thani of Qatar said that, "The 2011 calendar could not have gotten to a better start than with an event in the Philippines, where basketball is almost a religion." The country last won the club championship in 1996 when Hapee Toothpaste defeated Japanese basketball club Isuzu Lynx.

== Venue ==
Venue Map

Former SBP executive director Noli Eala announced that the venue for the FIBA Asia Champions Cup in 2011 would be the Philsports Arena in Pasig, Manila, Philippines. The arena, which is located inside the PhilSports Complex, is maintained by the Philippine Sports Commission, a government-run organization aimed at developing sports in the country.

The arena enjoys a rich basketball tradition having been the venue of most of the games of the Philippine Basketball Association, the first and oldest professional basketball league in Asia and the oldest in the world outside the U.S., from 1985 to 1992 and from 1999 to 2002. Further, it also hosted the majority of the games in the elimination round of the basketball tournaments of the 2010–11 season of the University Athletic Association of the Philippines.

In January 2011, FIBA Asia deputy secretary general Hagop Khajirian along with SBP president Manuel V. Pangilinan inspected the venue.

Pasig
PhilSports Arena
Capacity: 10,000
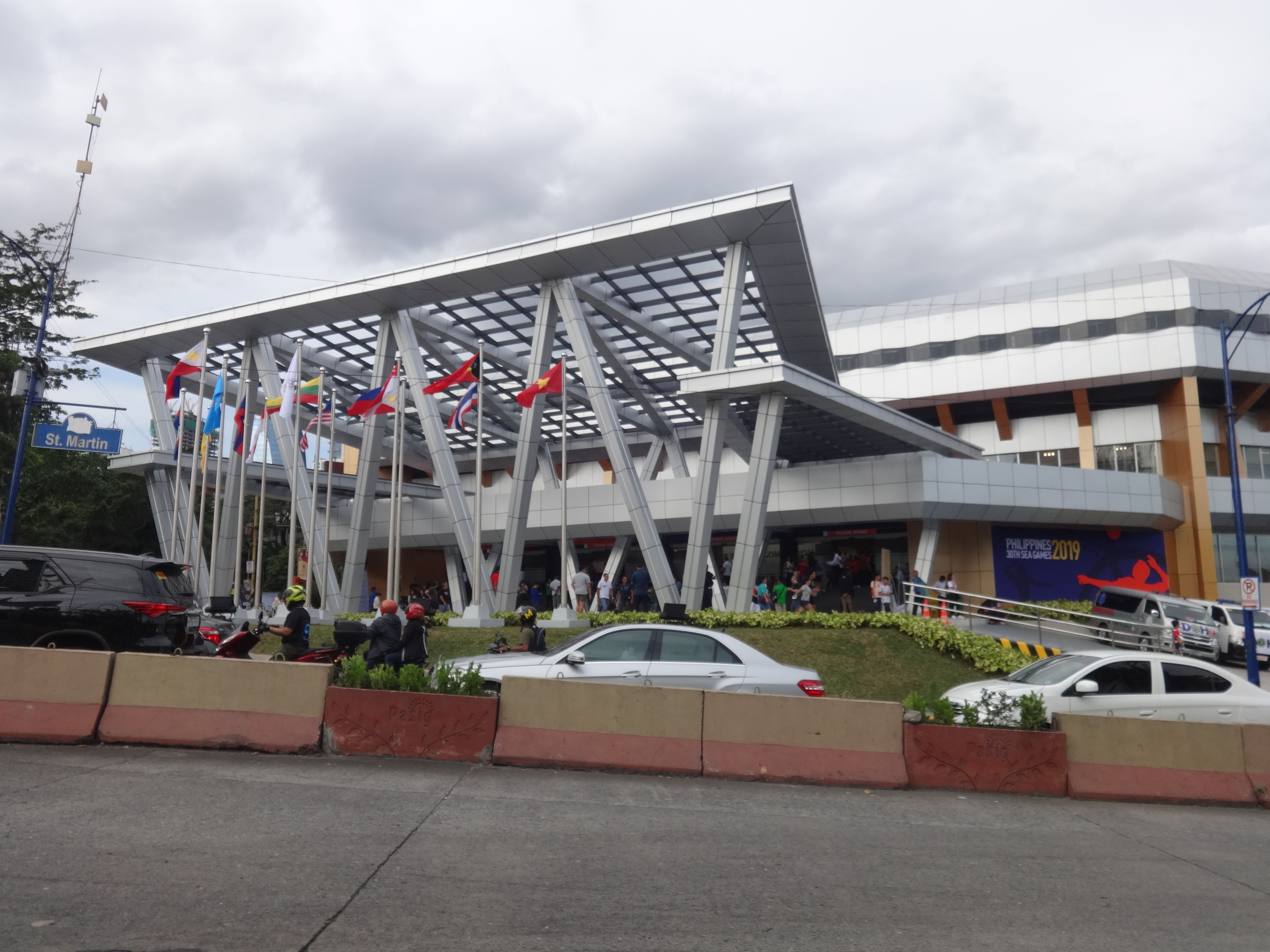

== Qualification ==
Ten professional basketball clubs from the Asian region competed in the annual tournament. All of the five FIBA Asia sub-zones had one automatic berth each. The Philippines were represented by Smart Gilas, the country's Philippine national team, as part of the club's preparations for the FIBA Asia Championship of the same year. Smart Gilas was joined by nine other teams from West Asia, Middle Asia, East Asia, Southeast Asia, and the Gulf.

For the participating clubs teams from the Gulf sub-zone, Al Shabab and Al-Rayyan were representing United Arab Emirates and Qatar, respectively. A club from the Middle Asia sub-zone was also invited to participate in the tournament. But due to financial reasons, the invited teams from Kazakhstan and Afghanistan begged off from the tournament. FIBA Asia Champions Cup 2011 organizing committee chairman Aboy Castro said that a replacement club from India, which is also bracketed under the Middle Asia sub-zone by FIBA Asia, has already been contacted. However, India withdrew from participating in the tournament.

Initially, the East Asia sub-zone was supposed to be represented by a club from Japan. FIBA Asia deputy secretary general Hagop Khajirian, at the tournament's group draw, reported that a top Japanese club from the BJ League would participate in the Asia Champions Cup this year. Khajirian said that they were waiting for either the Ryukyu Golden Kings or Rizing Fukuoka to confirm their participation. However, the Japan Basketball Association withdrew from the tournament, prompting the organizers to invite a replacement from the Korean Basketball League. Afterwards, South Korea declined the invitation to participate in the event.

=== Wild cards ===
Two wild cards were determined by FIBA Asia as Korea and India failed to confirm their participation in the tournament. The spots for the two countries were filled in by Duhok of Iraq and Al-Ittihad of Saudi Arabia. FIBA Asia secretary general Dato Yeoh Choo Hock, explaining the wild cards, said that, "Our aim is to have a fairly balanced and completely competitive event. In the past too, we have given similar wild cards keeping mind the need for a competitive event."

=== WABA Super League ===
Four teams were eligible to qualify from the West Asia Basketball Association Champions Cup, which is the West Asian basketball club championship. Lebanese basketball team Al-Riyadi, who placed third in both 2008 and 2009 editions of the FIBA Asia Champions Cup, and Syrian club Al Jalaa have qualified by just entering the semifinals of the 2011 WABA Super League. Even though Al-Jalaa did not show up to play the fifth game of the WABA finals in 2011, the club was still allowed to participate in the year's Champions Cup. However, the team was penalized with a two-year ban from playing in the WABA Champions Cup and was also fined US$30,000.

Two-time defending FIBA Asia Champions Cup winner Mahram Tehran defeated Zob Ahan in their battle for third place to qualify as the team from Iran. ASU, on the other hand, beat Al Riyadi Aramex in the qualifying game to identify the Jordanian representative to the tournament.

=== ASEAN Basketball League ===
In March 2011, FIBA Asia secretary general Dato Yeoh Choo Hock announced that the Chang Thailand Slammers, the 2010–11 ASEAN Basketball League champions, would represent the Southeast Asia sub-zone in the event. However, the Basketball Association of Thailand got suspended, prohibiting the team from participating in any FIBA-sanctioned event. This led ABL CEO Kuhan Foo and FIBA Asia to replace the Slammers with the Westports KL Dragons, ranked third in the ABL, for the year's Champions Cup.

To prepare for the tournament, the Malaysian players of the KL Dragons competed as a team in the 17th Father Martin Cup, a pre-season collegiate basketball tournament in the Philippines. KL Dragons assistant coach Ariel Vanguardia was also named head coach of the team for the Champions Cup as Goh Heng Chuat, who coaches the team in the ABL, is busy preparing the Malaysia national basketball team for the 2011 Southeast Asia Basketball Association tournament and the 2011 Southeast Asian Games.

=== Qualified teams ===
| East Asia | Gulf | Middle Asia | Southeast Asia | West Asia |
|---|---|---|---|---|
| | (Saudi Arabia) Al-Ittihad | | (Philippines) Smart Gilas | (Lebanon) Al-Riyadi |
| | (Qatar) Al-Rayyan | | (Malaysia) KL Dragons | (Syria) Al-Jalaa Aleppo |
| | (United Arab Emirates) Al Shabab | | | (Iran) Mahram Tehran |
| | | | | (Jordan) ASU |
| | | | | (Iraq) Duhok |

* Note: For the East Asia sub-zone, Japan withdrew from the event as they were still recovering from the Tōhoku earthquake and tsunami. Korea also turned down the invitation to participate in the event. Japan's original slot was later awarded to Al-Ittihad of Saudi Arabia. For the middle Asia sub-zone, its slot was awarded to Duhok of Iraq after Kazakhstan, Afghanistan, and India all begged off from the tournament.

== Group draw ==
The draw was held on April 15, 2011 at the Discovery Suites Hotel, Pasig. FIBA Asia deputy secretary general Hagop Khajirian conducted the draw along with SBP president Manny Pangilinan, SBP executive director Sonny Barrios, and former FIBA Asia secretary general Mauricio C. Martelino. The qualified basketball clubs were divided into two groups of five.

| Group A | Group B |
|---|---|
| (Jordan) ASU (Malaysia) KL Dragons (Saudi Arabia) Al-Ittihad (Iraq) Duhok (Philippines) Smart Gilas | (Lebanon) Al-Riyadi (Qatar) Al-Rayyan (United Arab Emirates) Al Shabab (Iran) Mahram Tehran (Syria) Al Jalaa |

== Squads ==
All 10 participating clubs for the 2011 Fiba Asia Champions Cup had 15 players on their rosters. Each team was allowed to tap two imports to reinforce their squads.

== Opening ceremony ==
The opening ceremony of the tournament was held on May 27, 2011 at the Meralco multi-purpose hall in Pasig. The participating teams from West Asia, Southeast Asia, and the Gulf regions attended the welcome dinner where the Filipino culture dominated the theme of the ceremony. The guests were entertained by Filipino folk dances during the event, and were served Filipino dishes.

== Preliminary round ==
For the preliminary round, 10 teams were drawn into two groups composing of five teams each. The clubs played against all the other teams in their respective groups. The top four teams from each group advanced to the knockout stage. The two teams that finished last in their groups played against each other for the ninth place.

=== Group A ===
| Team | Pld | W | L | PF | PA | PD | Pts |
|---|---|---|---|---|---|---|---|
| (Philippines) Smart Gilas | 4 | 4 | 0 | 346 | 271 | +74 | 8 |
| (Jordan) ASU | 4 | 3 | 1 | 328 | 288 | +40 | 7 |
| (Saudi Arabia) Al-Ittihad | 4 | 2 | 2 | 319 | 331 | −12 | 6 |
| (Iraq) Duhok | 4 | 1 | 3 | 293 | 307 | −14 | 5 |
| (Malaysia) KL Dragons | 4 | 0 | 4 | 293 | 382 | −89 | 4 |

All times are local (UTC+08).

May 28
14:00

Report
Boxscore

| Duhok (Iraq) | 66–74 | (Jordan) ASU |
Scoring by quarter: 17–15, 16–26, 17–8, 16–25
| Pts: Gray 16; Rebs: Hamad 8 Asts: Al-Doori 4 | | Pts: Watkins 25; Rebs: Watkins 17; Asts: Daghlas 5 |

PhilSports Arena, Pasig
Referees: Marwan Egho (LIB), Yasser Abbas (QAT), Amer Segare (UAE)

May 28
18:00

Report
Boxscore

| Smart Gilas (Philippines) | 101–69 | (Saudi Arabia) Al-Ittihad |
Scoring by quarter: 19–16, 26–15, 33–16, 23–22
| Pts: Aguilar 20; Rebs: Taulava, Douthit 7 Asts: Tiu 6 | | Pts: Dragajlovic 18; Rebs: Dragajlovic, Almaghrabi 5 Asts: Keely 5 |

PhilSports Arena, Pasig
Referees: Illija Belosevic (SRB), Reza Javadi (IRI), Jamal Al Turk (SYR)

May 29
14:00

Report
Boxscore

| Al-Ittihad (Saudi Arabia) | 83–75 | (Iraq) Duhok |
Scoring by quarter: 21–20, 16–17, 20–13, 26–25
| Pts: Dragajlovic 27; Rebs: Dragajlovic 15; Asts: Kabe 5 | | Pts: Gray 22; Rebs: Giles 14; Asts: Al-Doori 6 |

PhilSports Arena, Pasig
Referees: Heros Avanesian (IRI), Jamal Al Turk (SYR), Yasser Abbas (QAT)

May 29
18:00

Report
Boxscore

| KL Dragons (Malaysia) | 64–95 | (Philippines) Smart Gilas |
Scoring by quarter: 15–20, 25–19, 9–26, 15–30
| Pts: Ayer 31; Rebs: Ayer 13; Asts: Ban Sin 4 | | Pts: Tiu 11; Rebs: Douthit 14; Asts: Casio 7 |

PhilSports Arena, Pasig
Referees: Pablo Alberto Estevez (ARG), Rabah Noujaim (LIB), Amer Segare (UAE)

May 30
14:00

Report
Boxscore

| ASU (Jordan) | 79–69 | (Saudi Arabia) Al-Ittihad |
Scoring by quarter: 19–18, 17–16, 25–21, 18–14
| Pts: Al-Awadi 26; Rebs: Abbas, Watkins 7 Asts: Daghlas 9 | | Pts: Keely 26; Rebs: Dragajlovic 16; Asts: Keely 7 |

PhilSports Arena, Pasig
Referees: Pablo Alberto Estevez (ARG), Heros Avanesian (IRI), Rabah Noujaim (LIB)

May 30
16:00

Report
Boxscore

| Duhok (Iraq) | 88–76 | (Malaysia) KL Dragons |
Scoring by quarter: 28–13, 12–25, 22–14, 26–24
| Pts: Giles 28; Rebs: Giles 15; Asts: Al-Doori 7 | | Pts: Ayer 22; Rebs: Ayer 14; Asts: Batumalai, Sin 4 |

PhilSports Arena, Pasig
Referees: Marwan Egho (LIB), Amer Segare (UAE), Reza Javadi (IRI)

May 31
16:00

Report
Boxscore

| KL Dragons (Malaysia) | 77–101 | (Jordan) ASU |
Scoring by quarter: 22–26, 10–32, 22–24, 23–19
| Pts: Ayer 21; Rebs: Ayer 12; Asts: Sin, Fai 5 | | Pts: Daghles 19; Rebs: Hadrab, Watkins 12; Asts: Daghles 9 |

PhilSports Arena, Pasig
Referees: Ilija Belosevic (SRB), Yasser Abbas (QAT), Rabah Noujaim (LIB)

May 31
20:00

Report
Boxscore

| Smart Gilas (Philippines) | 74–64 | (Iraq) Duhok |
Scoring by quarter: 21–17, 26–18, 12–18, 15–11
| Pts: Douthit 14; Rebs: Douthit 15; Asts: Tiu 9 | | Pts: Giles 20; Rebs: Giles 23; Asts: Gray 4 |

PhilSports Arena, Pasig
Referees: Heros Avanesian (IRI), Marwan Egho (LIB), Jamal Al Turk (SYR)

June 1
14:00

Report
Boxscore

| Al-Ittihad (Saudi Arabia) | 98–76 | (Malaysia) KL Dragons |
Scoring by quarter: 25–24, 38–18, 13–17, 22–17
| Pts: Keely 36; Rebs: Dragajlovic 16; Asts: Almaghrabi 9 | | Pts: Fai 19; Rebs: Morris, Ayer 8 Asts: Batumalai 7 |

PhilSports Arena, Pasig
Referees: Rabah Noujaim (LIB), Reza Javadi (IRI), Amer Segare (UAE)

June 1
20:00

Report
Boxscore

| ASU (Jordan) | 74–76 | (Philippines) Smart Gilas |
Scoring by quarter: 16–12, 12–15, 18–18, 28–31
| Pts: Watkins 25; Rebs: Abbas 13; Asts: Daghlas 8 | | Pts: Hontiveros 23; Rebs: Taulava 12; Asts: Casio 7 |

PhilSports Arena, Pasig
Referees: Pablo Alberto Estevez (ARG), Yasser Abbas (QAT), Marwan Egho (LIB)

=== Group B ===
| Team | Pld | W | L | PF | PA | PD | Pts |
|---|---|---|---|---|---|---|---|
| (Lebanon) Al-Riyadi | 4 | 4 | 0 | 349 | 309 | +40 | 8 |
| (Iran) Mahram Tehran | 4 | 3 | 1 | 330 | 272 | +58 | 7 |
| (Qatar) Al-Rayyan | 4 | 2 | 2 | 305 | 286 | +19 | 6 |
| (Syria) Al Jalaa | 4 | 1 | 3 | 292 | 325 | −33 | 5 |
| (United Arab Emirates) Al Shabab | 4 | 0 | 4 | 286 | 370 | −84 | 4 |

All times are local (UTC+08).

May 28
16:00

Report
Boxscore

| Al Jalaa (Syria) | 59–86 | (Iran) Mahram Tehran |
Scoring by quarter: 17–21, 12–26, 15–24, 15–15
| Pts: Walker 16; Rebs: Walker 9 Asts: J. Miller 3 | | Pts: Williams 34; Rebs: Nikkhah 10; Asts: Nikkhah 8 |

PhilSports Arena, Pasig
Referees: Pablo Alberto Estevez (ARG), Ricor Buaron (PHI), Naser Mohammad Ramadan Abu Rashed (JOR)

May 28
20:00

Report
Boxscore

| Al Shabab (United Arab Emirates) | 90–109 | (Lebanon) Al-Riyadi |
Scoring by quarter: 10–19, 23–27, 23–37, 34–26
| Pts: Fields 39; Rebs: Fields 8 Asts: Hajji 4 | | Pts: El Khatib 29; Rebs: Woods 8 Asts: Ahmed 9 |

PhilSports Arena, Pasig
Referees: Ferdinand Pascual (PHI), Sameer Saeed (IRI), Owe Shiong Chan (MAS)

May 29
16:00

Report
Boxscore

| Al-Rayyan (Qatar) | 90–67 | (Syria) Al Jalaa |
Scoring by quarter: 20–14, 27–18, 27–19, 16–16
| Pts: Leslie 30; Rebs: Ngombo 17; Asts: Ngombo, Musa 4 | | Pts: Parazian 20; Rebs: Walker 6 Asts: Deeb 5 |

PhilSports Arena, Pasig
Referees: Illija Belosevic (SRB), Mohammed Khalifa Al Saleh (KSA), Yen Sin Tee (MAS)

May 29
20:00

Report
Boxscore

| Mahram Tehran (Iran) | 90–73 | (United Arab Emirates) Al Shabab |
Scoring by quarter: 23–24, 22–17, 19–21, 26–11
| Pts: C. Williams 31; Rebs: C. Williams 8 Asts: Kamrani, Afagh 5 | | Pts: Fields 20; Rebs: Fields 7 Asts: Hajji 6 |

PhilSports Arena, Pasig
Referees: Naser Mohammad Ramadan Abu Rashed (JOR), Rafael Britanico (PHI), Sameer M.A. Saeed (IRQ)

May 30
18:00

Report
Boxscore

| Al-Riyadi (Lebanon) | 76–73 | (Iran) Mahram Tehran |
Scoring by quarter: 24–14, 13–25, 22–17, 17–17
| Pts: El Khatib 25; Rebs: Abdel-Moneim 15; Asts: Akl 5 | | Pts: Williams 32; Rebs: Williams 6 Asts: Kamrani 3 |

PhilSports Arena, Pasig
Referees: Ilija Belosevic (SRB), Owe Shiong Chan (MAS), Ferdinand Pascual (PHI)

May 30
20:00

Report
Boxscore

| Al Shabab (United Arab Emirates) | 60–78 | (Qatar) Al-Rayyan |
Scoring by quarter: 16–27, 17–16, 13–19, 14–16
| Pts: Fields 19; Rebs: Fields 7 Asts: Jasim 3 | | Pts: Ngombo 21; Rebs: Salem; Asts: Leslie, Ngombo 5 |

PhilSports Arena, Pasig
Referees: Naser Mohammad Abu Rashed (JOR), Ricor Buaron (PHI), Yen Sin Tee (MAS)

May 31
14:00

Report
Boxscore

| Al Jalaa (Syria) | 93–63 | (United Arab Emirates) Al Shabab |
Scoring by quarter: 26–13, 19–19, 25–15, 23–16
| Pts: Yaqqub 23; Rebs: Madanly 10; Asts: Madanly 7 | | Pts: Al Zaabi 24; Rebs: Fields 11; Asts: Fields 3 |

PhilSports Arena, Pasig
Referees: Rafael Britanico (PHI), Owe Shiong Chan (MAS), Mohammed Khalifa Al Saleh (KSA)

May 31
18:00

Report
Boxscore

| Al-Rayyan (Qatar) | 73–78 (OT) | (Lebanon) Al-Riyadi |
Scoring by quarter: 15–18, 20–11, 22–21, 13–20, Overtime: 3–8
| Pts: Ngombo 24; Rebs: Ngombo 11; Asts: Leslie 4 | | Pts: Ahmed 24; Rebs: Woods 17; Asts: Akl 6 |

PhilSports Arena, Pasig
Referees: Pablo Alberto Estevez (ARG), Ferdinand Pascual (PHI), Sameer Saeed (IRI)

June 1
16:00

Report
Boxscore

| Mahram Tehran (Iran) | 81–64 | (Qatar) Al-Rayyan |
Scoring by quarter: 18–16, 22–20, 22–15, 19–13
| Pts: Williams 23; Rebs: Samb 15; Asts: Nikkhah 9 | | Pts: Leslie 20; Rebs: Musa 9 Asts: Musa 4 |

PhilSports Arena, Pasig
Referees: Ilija Belosevic (SRB), Naser Mohammad Abu Rashed (JOR), Rafael Britanico (PHI)

June 1
18:00

Report
Boxscore

| Al-Riyadi (Lebanon) | 86–73 | (Syria) Al Jalaa |
Scoring by quarter: 15–20, 24–16, 20–15, 27–22
| Pts: Saoud 28; Rebs: Kanaan, Ibrahim, Fakhreddine 7 Asts: Ibrahim 10 | | Pts: Merjaneh 16; Rebs: Deeb, Merjaneh 6 Asts: J. Miller 4 |

PhilSports Arena, Pasig
Referees: Ricor Buaron (PHI), Yen Sin Tee (MAS), Owe Shiong Chan (MAS)

== Knockout round ==
=== Championship bracket ===
Quarterfinals
June 3, 2011 – Pasig
(Iran) Mahram Tehran | 102
(Saudi Arabia) Al-Ittihad | 65
June 3, 2011 – Pasig
(Philippines) Smart Gilas | 85
(Syria) Al Jalaa | 80
June 3, 2011 – Pasig
(Lebanon) Al-Riyadi | 106
(Iraq) Duhok | 80
June 3, 2011 – Pasig
(Jordan) ASU | 77
(Qatar) Al-Rayyan | 83

Semifinals
June 4, 2011 – Pasig
(Iran) Mahram Tehran | 80
(Philippines) Smart Gilas | 77
June 4, 2011 – Pasig
(Lebanon) Al-Riyadi | 71
(Qatar) Al-Rayyan | 52

Final
June 5, 2011 – Pasig
(Iran) Mahram Tehran | 82
(Lebanon) Al-Riyadi | 91
3rd place
June 5, 2011 – Pasig
(Philippines) Smart Gilas | 64
(Qatar) Al-Rayyan | 71

=== Consolation bracket ===
Semi-finals
June 4, 2011 – Pasig
(Saudi Arabia) Al-Ittihad | 77
(Syria) Al Jalaa | 85
June 4, 2011 – Pasig
(Iraq) Duhok | 90
(Jordan) ASU | 98

Fifth place
June 5, 2011 – Pasig
(Syria) Al Jalaa | 65
(Jordan) ASU | 72
Seventh place
June 5, 2011 – Pasig
(Saudi Arabia) Al-Ittihad | 104
(Iraq) Duhok | 95

=== Quarterfinals ===
All times are local (UTC+08).

June 3
14:00

Report
Boxscore

| Al-Riyadi (Lebanon) | 106–80 | (Iraq) Duhok |
Scoring by quarter: 25–19, 35–15, 25–24, 21–22
| Pts: Abdelnour 24; Rebs: Ibrahim 9 Asts: Ahmed, Ibrahim 6 | | Pts: Giles 29; Rebs: Giles 13; Asts: Al-Doori, Al-Tameemi, Gray, Giles 3 |

PhilSports Arena, Pasig
Referees: Reza Javadi (IRI), Amer Segare (UAE), Yen Sin Tee (MAS)

June 3
16:00

Report
Boxscore

| Mahram Tehran (Iran) | 102–65 | (Saudi Arabia) Al-Ittihad |
Scoring by quarter: 32–15, 20–15, 22–22, 28–13
| Pts: Samb 18; Rebs: Sahakiang 10; Asts: Williams 6 | | Pts: Keely 24; Rebs: Dragajlovic 11; Asts: Keely 6 |

PhilSports Arena, Pasig
Referees: Marwan Egho (LIB), Owe Shiong Chan (MAS), Naser Mohammad Ramadan Abu Rashed (JOR)

June 3
18:00

Report
Boxscore

| Smart Gilas (Philippines) | 85–80 | (Syria) Al Jalaa |
Scoring by quarter: 20–22, 14–19, 27–16, 24–23
| Pts: Douthit 26; Rebs: Douthit 12; Asts: Casio 9 | | Pts: Walker 25; Rebs: Walker 8 Asts: Walker 3 |

PhilSports Arena, Pasig
Referees: Pablo Alberto Estevez (ARG), Rabah Noujaim (LIB), Sameer Saeed (IRI)

June 3
20:00

Report
Boxscore

| ASU (Jordan) | 77–83 | (Qatar) Al-Rayyan |
Scoring by quarter: 19–16, 20–23, 16–24, 22–20
| Pts: Watkins 23; Rebs: Abbas 9 Asts: Daghles 8 | | Pts: Leslie 29; Rebs: Ngombo 8 Asts: Leslie 6 |

PhilSports Arena, Pasig
Referees: Illija Belosevic (SRB), Heros Avanesian (IRI), Ferdinand Pascual (PHI)

=== Semifinals 5th–8th ===
June 4
14:00

Report
Boxscore

| Al-Ittihad (Saudi Arabia) | 77–85 | (Syria) Al Jalaa |
Scoring by quarter: 16–18, 22–25, 21–26, 18–16
| Pts: Dragajlovic, Almaghrabi 16; Rebs: Dragajlovic 13; Asts: Aljuhani 5 | | Pts: Yakoub 17; Rebs: Yakoub 10; Asts: J. Miller 8 |

PhilSports Arena, Pasig
Referees: Yasser Abbas (QAT), Rafael Britanico (PHI), Reza Javadi (IRI)

June 4
16:00

Report
Boxscore

| Duhok (Iraq) | 90–98 | (Jordan) ASU |
Scoring by quarter: 17–30, 26–20, 26–17, 21–31
| Pts: Giles 24; Rebs: Giles 10; Asts: Al Juboori 9 | | Pts: Islam 32; Rebs: Islam 14; Asts: Daghlas 12 |

PhilSports Arena, Pasig
Referees: Rabah Noujaim (LIB), Ricor Buaron (PHI), Mohammed Khalifa Al Saleh (KSA)

=== Semifinals ===
June 4
18:00

Report
Boxscore

| Mahram Tehran (Iran) | 80–77 | (Philippines) Smart Gilas |
Scoring by quarter: 20–21, 25–18, 17–23, 18–15
| Pts: Nikkhah 19; Rebs: Samb 13; Asts: Kamrani 4 | | Pts: Douthit 25; Rebs: Douthit 13; Asts: Casio, Douthit, Lassiter 3 |

PhilSports Arena, Pasig
Referees: Illija Belosevic (SRB), Naser Mohammad Ramadan Abu Rashed (JOR), Amer Segare (UAE)

June 4
20:00

Report
Boxscore

| Al-Riyadi (Lebanon) | 71–52 | (Qatar) Al-Rayyan |
Scoring by quarter: 19–8, 19–13, 15–14, 18–17
| Pts: Ahmed 25; Rebs: Ahmed 12; Asts: Ahmed 5 | | Pts: Ngombo 15; Rebs: Cufee 7 Asts: Leslie 4 |

PhilSports Arena, Pasig
Referees: Pablo Alberto Estevez (ARG), Sameer Saeed (IRI), Owe Shiong Chan (MAS)

=== 7th place ===
All times are local (UTC+08).

June 5
12:00

Report
Boxscore

| Al-Ittihad (Saudi Arabia) | 104–95 | (Iraq) Duhok |
Scoring by quarter: 29–21, 29–20, 20–29, 26–25
| Pts: Dragajlovic 28; Rebs: Dragajlovic 21; Asts: Kabe, Almaghrabi 5 | | Pts: Gray 30; Rebs: Al Juboori 9 Asts: Al Juboori 5 |

PhilSports Arena, Pasig
Referees: Jamal Al Turk (SYR), Ricor Buaron (PHI), Yen Sin Tee (MAS)

=== 5th place ===
June 5
14:00

Report
Boxscore

| Al Jalaa (Syria) | 65–72 | (Jordan) ASU |
Scoring by quarter: 17–11, 21–13, 9–18, 18–30
| Pts: J. Miller 16; Rebs: Yakoub 13; Asts: Madanly 7 | | Pts: Soobzokov 19; Rebs: Abbas 10; Asts: Al-Sous 2 |

PhilSports Arena, Pasig
Referees: Rabah Noujaim (LIB), Owe Shiong Chan (MAS), Mohammed Khalifa Al Saleh (KSA)

=== 3rd place ===
June 5
16:00

Report
Boxscore

| Smart Gilas (Philippines) | 64–71 | (Qatar) Al-Rayyan |
Scoring by quarter: 15–17, 18–19, 13–14, 18–21
| Pts: Douthit 18; Rebs: Douthit 17; Asts: Casio 7 | | Pts: Leslie 19; Rebs: Musa 13; Asts: Cufee 3 |

PhilSports Arena, Pasig
Referees: Marwan Egho (LIB), Heros Avanesian (IRI), Amer Segare (UAE)

=== Finals ===
June 5
18:00

Report
Boxscore

| Mahram Tehran (Iran) | 82–91 | (Lebanon) Al-Riyadi |
Scoring by quarter: 14–17, 25–21, 19–19, 24–34
| Pts: Nikkhah 28; Rebs: Kamrani, C. Williams 7 Asts: Nikkhah 7 | | Pts: El Khatib 41; Rebs: Woods 16; Asts: Mahmoud 5 |

PhilSports Arena, Pasig
Referees: Pablo Alberto Estevez (ARG), Illija Belosevic (SRB), Ferdinand Pascual (PHI)

== Final standings ==
| Rank | Team | Record |
|---|---|---|
| Gold medal | (Lebanon) Al Riyadi | 7–0 |
| Silver medal | (Iran) Mahram Tehran | 5–2 |
| Bronze medal | (Qatar) Al-Rayyan | 4–3 |
| 4 | (Philippines) Smart Gilas | 5–2 |
Failed to Reach Semifinals
| 5 | (Jordan) ASU | 5–2 |
| 6 | (Syria) Al Jalaa | 2–5 |
| 7 | (Saudi Arabia) Al-Ittihad | 3–4 |
| 8 | (Iraq) Duhok | 1–6 |
Failed to Reach Quarterfinals
| 9 | (United Arab Emirates) Al Shabab | 0–4 |
| 9 | (Malaysia) KL Dragons | 0–4 |

=== Awards ===
2011 FIBA Asia Champions Cup

Al Riyadi
1st title

Most Valuable Player
(Lebanon) Fadi El Khatib

== Statistical leaders ==
The top ten of the five statistics are shown below.

Points

| Pos. | Name | G | Pts. | PPG |
|---|---|---|---|---|
| 1 | (United Arab Emirates) Courtney Fields | 4 | 99 | 24.8 |
| 2 | (Iran) Christopher Williams | 7 | 171 | 24.4 |
| 3 | (Malaysia) Christopher Ayer | 4 | 89 | 22.3 |
| 4 | (Saudi Arabia) Vladislav Dragajlovic | 7 | 151 | 21.6 |
| 5 | (Lebanon) Fadi El-Khatib | 7 | 147 | 21.0 |
| 6 | (Qatar) Chauncey Leslie | 7 | 139 | 19.9 |
| 7 | (Philippines) Marcus Douthit | 7 | 134 | 19.1 |
| 8 | (Jordan) Jameel Watkins | 6 | 112 | 18.7 |
| 9 | (Iraq) C.J. Giles | 7 | 130 | 18.6 |
| 10 | (United States) Chudnay Earl Gray | 6 | 109 | 18.2 |

Rebounds

| Pos. | Name | G | Rebs. | RPG |
|---|---|---|---|---|
| 1 | (Saudi Arabia) Vladislav Dragajlovic | 7 | 97 | 13.9 |
| 2 | (Iraq) C.J. Giles | 7 | 85 | 12.1 |
| 3 | (Philippines) Marcus Douthit | 7 | 85 | 12.1 |
| 4 | (Malaysia) Christopher Ayer | 4 | 47 | 11.8 |
| 5 | (Lebanon) Loren Woods | 6 | 64 | 10.7 |
| 6 | (Lebanon) Ahmad Ismail | 6 | 63 | 10.5 |
| 7 | (Jordan) Jameel Watkins | 6 | 59 | 9.8 |
| 8 | (Qatar) Tanguy Ngombo | 7 | 68 | 9.7 |
| 9 | (United Arab Emirates) Courtney Fields | 4 | 33 | 8.3 |
| 10 | (Iran) Cheikh Samb | 7 | 55 | 7.9 |

Assists

| Pos. | Name | G | Asts. | APG |
|---|---|---|---|---|
| 1 | (Jordan) Osama Daghles | 7 | 52 | 7.4 |
| 2 | (Philippines) J.V. Casio | 7 | 43 | 6.1 |
| 3 | (Iran) Samad Nikkhah Bahrami | 7 | 34 | 4.9 |
| 4 | (Iraq) Ali Al Juboori | 3 | 14 | 4.7 |
| 5 | (Malaysia) Guganeswaran Batumalai | 4 | 18 | 4.5 |
| 6 | (Saudi Arabia) Darren Keely | 7 | 30 | 4.3 |
| 7 | (United States) Jamaal Miller | 7 | 30 | 4.3 |
| 8 | (Iraq) Quitaba Al-Doori | 7 | 29 | 4.1 |
| 9 | (United Arab Emirates) Jassim Haji | 3 | 12 | 4.0 |
| 10 | (Lebanon) Rodrigue Akl | 5 | 20 | 4.0 |

Blocks

| Pos. | Name | G | Blocks. | BPG |
|---|---|---|---|---|
| 1 | (Iran) Cheikh Samb | 5 | 18 | 3.6 |
| 2 | (Lebanon) Loren Woods | 4 | 14 | 3.5 |
| 3 | (Iraq) C.J. Giles | 5 | 10 | 2.0 |
| 4 | (Philippines) Marcus Douthit | 5 | 8 | 1.6 |
| 5 | (Malaysia) Christopher Ayer | 4 | 7 | 1.7 |
| 6 | (Syria) Samaki Walker | 5 | 6 | 1.7 |
| 7 | (Lebanon) Ali Fakhreddine | 3 | 4 | 1.3 |
| 8 | (Philippines) Asi Taulava | 5 | 4 | 1.2 |
| 9 | (Philippines) Japeth Aguilar | 5 | 5 | 1.0 |
| 10 | (Syria) Marcelle Yaqqub | 5 | 5 | 1.0 |

Steals

| Pos. | Name | G | Stls. | SPG |
|---|---|---|---|---|
| 1 | (Iran) Hamed Afagh | 5 | 13 | 2.6 |
| 2 | (Iraq) Qutaiba Al-Doori | 5 | 9 | 1.8 |
| 3 | (Jordan) Jameel Watkins | 5 | 8 | 1.6 |
| 4 | (Iraq) C.J. Giles | 5 | 7 | 1.4 |
| 5 | (Philippines) Marcus Douthit | 5 | 6 | 1.2 |
| 6 | (United Arab Emirates) Courtney Fields | 4 | 5 | 1.2 |
| 7 | (United Arab Emirates) Christopher Williams | 5 | 5 | 1.0 |
| 8 | (Saudi Arabia) Darren Keely | 5 | 5 | 1.0 |
| 9 | (Philippines) J.V. Casio | 5 | 5 | 1.0 |
| 10 | (Iraq) Ali Hamad | 5 | 4 | 0.8 |

== Tournament officials ==
Through the tournament's official website, FIBA Asia named the referees and commissioners that will officiate the FIBA Asia Champions Cup 2011. Below are the technical officials for the entire tournament:

- Team referees
  - QAT Yasser Abbas
  - JOR Naser Mohammad Abu Rashed
  - KSA Mohammed Khalifa Al Saleh
  - SYR Jamal Al Turk
  - IRI Heros Avanesian
  - PHI Rafael Britanico
  - PHI Ricor Buaron
  - MAS Owe Shiong Chan
  - LIB Marwan Egho
  - IRI Reza Javadi
  - LIB Rabah Noujaim
  - PHI Ferdinand Pascual
  - IRQ Sameer M.A. Saeed
  - UAE Amer Segare
  - MAS Yen Sin Tee
- Neutral referees
  - SRB Ilija Belosevic
  - ARG Pablo Alberto Estevez
- Commissioners
  - OMA Faris Said Salim Al Khalasi
  - PHI Igmidio Reyes Cahanding
  - VIE Nguyen Ngo Tuan
  - PHI Anthony Angulo Sulit
  - MAS Kak Kuan Lee (FIBA Asia)

== Media ==
=== Broadcasting rights ===
The FIBA Asia Champions Cup was aired on Philippine VHF television network Intercontinental Broadcasting Corporation via Sports5. In April 2011, Sports5, the sports division of TV5, signed a blocktime agreement with IBC-13 to air live sports coverage via AKTV, a primetime block that airs local and international sports events.

| Country | Broadcaster |
|---|---|
| Philippines | IBC-13 (AKTV) |

=== Event website ===
In May 2011, FIBA Asia announced that the official site of the tournament has gone live online. The website has all the information about the event such as its overview, rosters, and system of competition. In addition, the website also features real-time updates as well as news, live game results, and interviews.

=== Live streaming ===
The organizers announced in June 2011 that all of the final round games of the FIBA Asia Champions Cup 2011 will be streamed live on FIBAtv.com and FIBAAsiaTV.com. The highlights of all these games will also be available in the tournament's official website.
