= 2010 FIBA World Championship squads =

The 2010 FIBA World Championship included 24 teams that competed in Turkey between August 28 and September 12, 2010. Each team selected a squad of 12 players for the tournament. Final squads for the tournament were due on August 26, two days before the start of competition.

Angola and the United States were the only teams made up of entirely domestic players (Jordan and Russia each had 11). Slovenia and Canada were the only teams composed entirely of players playing outside the domestic league, although at the time of the tournament Canada had no pro league exclusive to the country, instead competing in several U.S.-Canada cross-border professional and semi-professional leagues. Forty-one National Basketball Association players were selected to compete in the tournament, the most of any league. In all, thirty countries had at least one player from their league system participate in the tournament.

== Group A ==
=== Angola ===
Head coach: (Portugal) Luís Magalhães

#	Pos	Name	Date of birth	Height	Club
4	G	Olimpio Cipriano	April 9, 1982 (age 28)	6'4" (194)	(Angola) Recreativo do Libolo
5	G	Roberto Fortes	November 9, 1984 (age 25)	6'4" (193)	(Angola) Petro Atlético
6	F	Carlos Morais	October 16, 1985 (age 24)	6'3" (190)	(Angola) Primeiro de Agosto
7	G	Domingos Bonifacio	October 28, 1984 (age 25)	6'2" (189)	(Angola) Recreativo do Libolo
8	F	Leonel Paulo	April 30, 1986 (age 24)	6'6" (198)	(Angola) Recreativo do Libolo
9	G	Vladimir Ricardino	October 4, 1978 (age 31)	6'8" (203)	(Angola) Primeiro de Agosto
10	F	Joaquim Gomes	December 23, 1980 (age 29)	6'4" (193)	(Angola) Primeiro de Agosto
11	C	Divaldo Mbunga	September 4, 1985 (age 24)	6'9" (206)	(Angola) Petro Atlético
12	F	Felizardo Ambrosio	December 25, 1987 (age 22)	6'7" (201)	(Angola) Primeiro de Agosto
13	F	Carlos Almeida	September 24, 1976 (age 33)	6'4" (193)	(Angola) Primeiro de Agosto
14	G	Miguel Lutonda	December 24, 1971 (age 38)	6'1" (185)	(Angola) Primeiro de Agosto
15	C	Eduardo Mingas	January 29, 1979 (age 31)	6'7" (200)	(Angola) Primeiro de Agosto

=== Argentina ===
Head coach: (Argentina) Sergio Hernández

#	Pos	Name	Date of birth	Height	Club
4	F	Luis Scola	April 30, 1980 (age 30)	6'9" (207)	(United States) Houston Rockets
5	G	Pablo Prigioni	May 17, 1977 (age 33)	6'1" (186)	(Spain) Real Madrid
6	C	Román González	January 28, 1978 (age 32)	6'10" (208)	(Argentina) Quimsa
7	C	Fabricio Oberto	March 21, 1975 (age 35)	6'9" (207)	(United States) Washington Wizards
8	C	Juan Pedro Gutiérrez	October 10, 1983 (age 26)	6'9" (205)	(Argentina) Obras Sanitarias
9	G	Luis Cequeira	February 4, 1985 (age 25)	5'11" (180)	(Argentina) Obras Sanitarias
10	G	Carlos Delfino	August 29, 1982 (age 27)	6'5" (196)	(United States) Milwaukee Bucks
11	G	Paolo Quinteros	January 15, 1979 (age 31)	6'2" (188)	(Spain) CAI Zaragoza
12	F	Leonardo Gutiérrez	May 16, 1978 (age 32)	6'7" (200)	(Argentina) Peñarol
13	F	Marcos Mata	August 1, 1986 (age 24)	6'7" (201)	(Argentina) Peñarol
14	G	Hernán Jasen	February 4, 1978 (age 32)	6'6" (199)	(Spain) Asefa Estudiantes
15	F	Federico Kammerichs	June 21, 1980 (age 30)	6'8" (204)	(Argentina) Regatas Corrientes

=== Australia ===
Head coach: (United States) Brett Brown

#	Pos	Name	Date of birth	Height	Club
4	G	Damian Martin	September 5, 1984 (age 25)	6'2" (188)	(Australia) Perth Wildcats
5	G	Patrick Mills	August 11, 1988 (age 22)	5'11" (181)	(United States) Portland Trail Blazers
6	G	Adam Gibson	October 30, 1986 (age 32)	6'7" (200)	(Australia) Gold Coast Blaze
7	F	Joe Ingles	October 2, 1987 (age 22)	6'8" (203)	(Spain) FC Barcelona
8	G	Brad Newley	February 18, 1985 (age 25)	6'6" (198)	(Lithuania) Lietuvos Rytas
9	G	Steven Marković	March 14, 1985 (age 25)	6'2" (188)	(Serbia) Red Star Belgrade
10	F	David Barlow	October 22, 1983 (age 26)	6'9" (205)	(Spain) CAI Zaragoza
11	F	Mark Worthington	June 8, 1983 (age 27)	6'8" (202)	(Germany) Brose Baskets
12	F	Aron Baynes	December 9, 1986 (age 23)	6'9" (205)	(Germany) EWE Baskets
13	C	David Andersen	June 23, 1980 (age 30)	6'11" (212)	(Canada) Toronto Raptors
14	F	Matt Nielsen	February 3, 1978 (age 32)	6'10" (209)	(Greece) Olympiacos
15	C	Aleks Marić	October 22, 1984 (age 25)	6'11" (210)	(Greece) Panathinaikos

=== Germany ===
Head coach: (Germany) Dirk Bauermann

#	Pos	Name	Date of birth	Height	Club
4	G	Lucca Staiger	June 14, 1988 (age 22)	6'5" (195)	(Germany) ALBA Berlin
5	G	Heiko Schaffartzik	January 3, 1984 (age 26)	6'1" (185)	(Turkey) Türk Telekom B.K.
6	G	Per Günther	February 5, 1988 (age 22)	6'1" (185)	(Germany) Ratiopharm Ulm
7	C	Tim Ohlbrecht	August 30, 1988 (age 21)	6'11" (210)	(Germany) Telekom Baskets Bonn
8	C	Christopher McNaughton	October 11, 1982 (age 27)	6'11" (211)	(Germany) EWE Baskets Oldenburg
9	G	Steffen Hamann	June 14, 1981 (age 29)	6'5" (196)	(Germany) FC Bayern Munich
10	G	Demond Greene	June 15, 1979 (age 31)	6'1" (186)	(Germany) FC Bayern Munich
11	C	Tibor Pleiß	November 2, 1989 (age 20)	7'1" (216)	(Germany) Brose Baskets
12	F	Elias Harris	July 6, 1989 (age 21)	6'7" (201)	(United States) Gonzaga University
13	F	Philipp Schwethelm	May 1, 1989 (age 21)	6'7" (201)	(Germany) Eisbären Bremerhaven
14	F	Robin Benzing	January 25, 1989 (age 21)	6'10" (209)	(Germany) Ratiopharm Ulm
15	F	Jan-Hendrik Jagla	June 25, 1981 (age 29)	7'0" (213)	(Poland) Asseco Prokom Gdynia

=== Jordan ===
Head coach: (Portugal) Mário Palma

#	Pos	Name	Date of birth	Height	Club
4	G	Fadel Al-Najjar	April 2, 1985 (age 25)	6'4" (192)	(Jordan) Zain
5	G	Rasheim Wright	July 21, 1981 (age 29)	6'4" (194)	(Iran) Mahram Tehran
6	G	Zaid Abbas	November 21, 1983 (age 26)	6'8" (203)	(Jordan) Applied Science University
7	G	Mousa Al-Awadi	July 20, 1985 (age 25)	6'4" (192)	(Jordan) Zain
8	F	Mohammad Hamdan	November 6, 1984 (age 25)	6'7" (201)	(Jordan) Applied Science University
9	F	Enver Soobzokov	May 16, 1978 (age 32)	6'6" (198)	(Jordan) Zain
10	G	Sam Daghlas	September 18, 1979 (age 30)	6'6" (199)	(Jordan) Zain
11	G	Wesam Al-Sous	February 24, 1983 (age 27)	6'0" (183)	(Jordan) Applied Science University
12	C	Ali Jamal Zaghab	June 3, 1988 (age 22)	6'8" (203)	(Jordan) Aramex
13	C	Zaid Al-Khas	March 7, 1976 (age 34)	6'9" (206)	(Jordan) Zain
14	C	Mohammad Shaher Hussein	March 3, 1990 (age 20)	6'10" (209)	(Jordan) Zain
15	C	Ayman Adais	June 28, 1978 (age 31)	6'10" (208)	(Jordan) Zain

=== Serbia ===
Head coach: (Serbia) Dušan Ivković

#	Pos	Name	Date of birth	Height	Club
4	G	Miloš Teodosić	March 19, 1987 (age 23)	6'5" (195)	(Greece) Olympiacos
5	G	Milenko Tepić	February 7, 1987 (age 23)	6'7" (200)	(Greece) Panathinaikos
6	G	Aleksandar Rašić	March 16, 1984 (age 26)	6'5" (195)	(Serbia) Partizan Belgrade
7	G	Ivan Paunić	January 27, 1987 (age 23)	6'5" (195)	(Greece) Aris
8	F	Nemanja Bjelica	May 9, 1988 (age 22)	6'10" (209)	(Spain) Caja Laboral
9	G	Stefan Marković	April 25, 1988 (age 22)	6'6" (199)	(Italy) Benetton Treviso
10	F	Duško Savanović	September 5, 1983 (age 26)	6'8" (204)	(Spain) Power Electronics Valencia
11	F	Marko Kešelj	January 2, 1988 (age 22)	6'9" (206)	(Greece) Olympiacos
12	C	Nenad Krstić	July 25, 1983 (age 27)	7'0" (213)	(United States) Oklahoma City Thunder
13	C	Kosta Perović	February 19, 1985 (age 25)	7'2" (218)	(Spain) Regal FC Barcelona
14	F	Novica Veličković	October 5, 1986 (age 23)	6'9" (205)	(Spain) Real Madrid
15	F	Milan Mačvan	November 16, 1989 (age 20)	6'9" (205)	(Serbia) Hemofarm

== Group B ==
=== Brazil ===
Head coach: (Argentina) Rubén Magnano

#	Pos	Name	Date of birth	Height	Club
4	F	Marcelo Machado	April 12, 1975 (age 35)	6'7" (200)	(Brazil) Flamengo
5	G	Nezinho dos Santos	January 21, 1981 (age 29)	6'1" (185)	(Brazil) Universo de Brasília
6	C	Murilo Becker	July 14, 1983 (age 27)	6'10" (208)	(Brazil) São José
7	G	Raul Togni Neto	May 19, 1992 (age 18)	6'0" (184)	(Brazil) Minas
8	F	Alex Garcia	March 4, 1980 (age 30)	6'3" (191)	(Brazil) Universo de Brasília
9	G	Marcelo Huertas	May 25, 1983 (age 27)	6'3" (191)	(Spain) Caja Laboral
10	G	Leandro Barbosa	November 28, 1982 (age 27)	6'3" (191)	(Canada) Toronto Raptors
11	F	Anderson Varejão	September 28, 1982 (age 27)	6'10" (208)	(United States) Cleveland Cavaliers
12	F	Guilherme Giovannoni	June 2, 1980 (age 30)	6'8" (204)	(Brazil) Universo de Brasília
13	C	João Paulo Batista	October 29, 1981 (age 28)	6'11" (210)	(France) Le Mans
14	F	Marquinhos Vieira	May 31, 1984 (age 26)	6'8" (203)	(Brazil) EC Pinheiros
15	C	Tiago Splitter	January 1, 1985 (age 25)	6'11" (211)	(United States) San Antonio Spurs

=== Croatia ===
Head coach: (Croatia) Josip Vranković

#	Pos	Name	Date of birth	Height	Club
4	G	Roko Ukić	December 5, 1984 (age 25)	6'5" (196)	(Turkey) Fenerbahçe Ülker
5	G	Davor Kus	July 21, 1978 (age 32)	6'4" (192)	(Italy) Pallacanestro Treviso
6	G	Marko Popović	June 12, 1982 (age 28)	6'1" (185)	(Russia) UNICS Kazan
7	F	Bojan Bogdanović	April 18, 1989 (age 21)	6'8" (204)	(Croatia) KK Cibona
8	G	Rok Stipčević	May 20, 1986 (age 24)	6'0" (183)	(Croatia) KK Cibona
9	F	Marko Tomas	January 3, 1985 (age 25)	6'8" (202)	(Turkey) Fenerbahçe Ülker
10	G	Zoran Planinić	September 12, 1982 (age 27)	6'7" (200)	(Russia) BC Khimki
11	C	Ante Tomić	February 17, 1987 (age 23)	7'1" (217)	(Spain) Real Madrid
12	C	Krešimir Lončar	February 12, 1983 (age 27)	6'11" (210)	(Russia) BC Khimki
13	F	Marko Banić	November 5, 1984 (age 25)	6'9" (205)	(Spain) Bizkaia Bilbao Basket
14	C	Luka Žorić	November 5, 1984 (age 25)	6'11" (210)	(Croatia) KK Zagreb
15	C	Lukša Andrić	January 29, 1985 (age 25)	6'11" (210)	(Turkey) Galatasaray Café Crown

=== Iran ===
Head coach: (Serbia) Veselin Matić

#	Pos	Name	Date of birth	Height	Club
4	C	Mousa Nabipour	August 14, 1983 (age 27)	6'11" (212)	(Iran) Azad University Tehran
5	G	Aren Davoudi	July 12, 1986 (age 24)	5'10" (178)	(Iran) Zob Ahan Isfahan
6	G	Javad Davari	April 25, 1983 (age 27)	6'1" (186)	(Iran) Petrochimi Bandar Imam
7	G	Mehdi Kamrani	June 1, 1982 (age 28)	5'11" (180)	(Iran) Mahram Tehran
8	G	Saman Veisi	August 7, 1982 (age 28)	6'3" (191)	(Iran) Shahrdari Gorgan
9	G	Iman Zandi	September 19, 1981 (age 28)	6'2" (188)	(Iran) Louleh a.s Shiraz
10	F	Mohammad Hassanzadeh	October 6, 1990 (age 19)	6'7" (201)	(Iran) Saba Mehr Qazvin
11	F	Oshin Sahakian	March 21, 1986 (age 24)	6'5" (196)	(Iran) Zob Ahan Isfahan
12	F	Arsalan Kazemi	April 22, 1990 (age 20)	6'7" (201)	(United States) Rice University
13	C	Asghar Kardoust	March 21, 1986 (age 24)	6'11" (210)	(Iran) Azad University Tehran
14	G	Saeid Davarpanah	September 7, 1987 (age 22)	6'3" (190)	(Iran) Petrochimi Bandar Imam
15	C	Hamed Haddadi	May 19, 1985 (age 25)	7'2" (218)	(United States) Memphis Grizzlies

=== Slovenia ===
Head coach: (Slovenia) Memi Bečirovič

#	Pos	Name	Date of birth	Height	Club
4	F	Uroš Slokar	May 14, 1983 (age 27)	6'11" (210)	(Italy) Montepaschi Siena
5	G	Jaka Lakovič	July 9, 1978 (age 32)	6'0" (183)	(Spain) Regal FC Barcelona
6	C	Hasan Rizvić	January 18, 1984 (age 26)	6'11" (212)	(Russia) UNICS Kazan
7	G	Sani Bečirovič	May 19, 1981 (age 29)	6'5" (195)	(Italy) Armani Jeans Milano
8	G	Jaka Klobučar	August 19, 1987 (age 23)	6'6" (198)	(Serbia) Partizan Belgrade
9	G	Samo Udrih	August 2, 1979 (age 31)	6'5" (195)	(Spain) CB Estudiantes
10	F	Boštjan Nachbar	July 3, 1980 (age 30)	6'9" (206)	(Turkey) Efes Pilsen
11	G	Goran Dragić	May 6, 1986 (age 24)	6'3" (190)	(United States) Phoenix Suns
12	F	Goran Jagodnik	May 23, 1974 (age 36)	6'8" (202)	(Slovenia) KK Olimpija
13	F	Miha Zupan	September 13, 1982 (age 27)	6'9" (205)	(Russia) Spartak St. Petersburg
14	C	Gašper Vidmar	September 14, 1987 (age 22)	6'11" (210)	(Turkey) Fenerbahçe Ülker
15	C	Primož Brezec	October 2, 1979 (age 30)	7'1" (216)	(United States) Milwaukee Bucks

=== Tunisia ===
Head coach: (Tunisia) Adel Tlatli

#	Pos	Name	Date of birth	Height	Club
4	F	Radhouane Slimane	August 16, 1980 (age 30)	6'9" (205)	(United Arab Emirates) Al-Nasr SC
5	G	Marouan Laghnej	April 22, 1986 (age 24)	6'3" (190)	(Tunisia) JS Kairouan
6	G	Nizar Knioua	June 8, 1983 (age 27)	6'2" (188)	(Tunisia) Stade Nabeulien
7	F	Naim Dhifallah	April 12, 1982 (age 28)	6'5" (196)	(Tunisia) Club Africain
8	G	Marouan Kechrid	June 2, 1981 (age 29)	5'9" (176)	(Morocco) Amel Sportif Essaouira
9	F	Mohamed Hdidane	April 27, 1986 (age 24)	6'9" (206)	(Tunisia) Stade Nabeulien
10	F	Atef Maoua	January 28, 1981 (age 29)	6'6" (199)	(Spain) CB Ciudad de Huelva
11	C	Mokhtar Ghyaza	November 15, 1986 (age 23)	6'8" (203)	(Tunisia) ES Rades
12	F	Makrem Ben Romdhane	March 27, 1989 (age 21)	6'8" (204)	(Tunisia) ÉS Sahel
13	G	Amine Rzig	August 25, 1980 (age 30)	6'6" (198)	(Tunisia) Stade Nabeulien
14	C	Hamdi Braa	September 17, 1986 (age 23)	6'8" (203)	(Tunisia) ÉS Sahel
15	C	Salah Mejri	June 15, 1986 (age 24)	7'1" (216)	(Tunisia) ÉS Sahel

=== United States ===
Head coach: (United States) Mike Krzyzewski

#	Pos	Name	Date of Birth	Height	Club
4	G	Chauncey Billups	September 25, 1976 (age 33)	6'3" (191)	(United States) Denver Nuggets
5	F	Kevin Durant	September 29, 1988 (age 21)	6'9" (206)	(United States) Oklahoma City Thunder
6	G	Derrick Rose	October 4, 1988 (age 21)	6'3" (191)	(United States) Chicago Bulls
7	G	Russell Westbrook	November 12, 1988 (age 21)	6'3" (191)	(United States) Oklahoma City Thunder
8	F	Rudy Gay	September 17, 1986 (age 23)	6'8" (203)	(United States) Memphis Grizzlies
9	G	Andre Iguodala	January 28, 1984 (age 26)	6'6" (198)	(United States) Philadelphia 76ers
10	F	Danny Granger	April 20, 1983 (age 27)	6'8" (203)	(United States) Indiana Pacers
11	G	Stephen Curry	March 14, 1988 (age 22)	6'3" (191)	(United States) Golden State Warriors
12	G	Eric Gordon	December 25, 1988 (age 21)	6'3" (191)	(United States) Los Angeles Clippers
13	C	Kevin Love	September 7, 1988 (age 21)	6'10" (208)	(United States) Minnesota Timberwolves
14	F	Lamar Odom	November 6, 1979 (age 30)	6'10" (208)	(United States) Los Angeles Lakers
15	C	Tyson Chandler	October 2, 1982 (age 27)	7'1" (216)	(United States) Dallas Mavericks

== Group C ==
=== China ===
Head coach: (United States) Bob Donewald

#	Pos	Name	Date of birth	Height	Club
4	F	Ding Jinhui	October 27, 1990 (age 19)	6'8" (204)	(China) Zhejiang Whirlwinds
5	G	Liu Wei	January 15, 1980 (age 30)	6'3" (190)	(China) Shanghai Sharks
6	G	Yu Shulong	February 19, 1990 (age 20)	6'1" (185)	(China) Jilin Northeast Tigers
7	G	Wang Shipeng	April 6, 1983 (age 27)	6'6" (198)	(China) Guangdong Southern Tigers
8	G	Jin Lipeng	July 22, 1978 (age 32)	6'3" (190)	(China) Zhejiang Lions
9	F	Sun Yue	November 6, 1985 (age 24)	6'9" (206)	(China) Beijing Olympians
10	C	Zhang Zhaoxu	November 18, 1987 (age 22)	7'3" (221)	(United States) University of California, Berkeley
11	C	Yi Jianlian	October 27, 1987 (age 22)	7'0" (213)	(United States) Washington Wizards
12	G	Guo Ailun	November 14, 1993 (age 16)	6'4" (192)	(China) Liaoning Dinosaurs
13	F	Su Wei	July 28, 1989 (age 21)	6'11" (211)	(China) Guangdong Southern Tigers
14	F	Wang Zhizhi	July 8, 1977 (age 33)	7'0" (213)	(China) Bayi Rockets
15	F	Zhou Peng	October 11, 1989 (age 20)	6'9" (207)	(China) Guangdong Southern Tigers

=== Ivory Coast ===
Head coach: (Switzerland) Randoald Dessarzin

#	Pos	Name	Date of birth	Height	Club
4	F	Charles Abouo	November 4, 1989 (age 20)	6'5" (196)	(United States) Brigham Young University
5	G	Mouloukou Diabate	July 21, 1987 (age 23)	6'0" (182)	(France) JDA Dijon
6	F	Issife Soumahoro	October 31, 1988 (age 21)	6'5" (196)	(France) Strasbourg IG
7	G	Pape-Philippe Amagou	February 27, 1985 (age 25)	6'1" (185)	(Greece) Kavala
8	G	Kinidinnin Konate	August 23, 1980 (age 30)	6'2" (187)	(Ivory Coast) Abidjan
9	F	Herve Lamizana	January 22, 1981 (age 29)	6'10" (208)	(Lebanon) Al-Riyadi
10	F	Ismaël N'Diaye	April 22, 1982 (age 28)	6'6" (198)	(Switzerland) Lausanne MB
11	F	Brice Assie	June 3, 1983 (age 27)	6'8" (202)	(Argentina) San Martín de Corrientes
12	F	Jonathan Kale	October 25, 1985 (age 24)	6'6" (198)	(Germany) Phoenix Hagen
13	F	Didier Tape	October 25, 1981 (age 28)	6'6" (198)	(France) Stade Rodez Aveyron
14	G	Guy Edi	December 26, 1988 (age 21)	6'5" (196)	(United States) Midland College
15	C	Mohamed Kone	March 24, 1981 (age 29)	6'11" (211)	(Spain) Lagun Aro GBC

=== Greece ===
Head coach: (Lithuania) Jonas Kazlauskas

#	Pos	Name	Date of birth	Height	Club
4	C	Ian Vougioukas	May 31, 1985 (age 25)	6'11" (211)	(Greece) Panathinaikos
5	C	Ioannis Bourousis	November 17, 1983 (age 26)	7'0" (213)	(Greece) Olympiacos
6	G	Nikos Zisis	August 16, 1983 (age 27)	6'6" (197)	(Italy) Montepaschi Siena
7	G	Vassilis Spanoulis	August 7, 1982 (age 28)	6'4" (192)	(Greece) Olympiacos
8	G	Nick Calathes	February 7, 1989 (age 21)	6'6" (198)	(Greece) Panathinaikos
9	F	Antonis Fotsis	April 1, 1981 (age 29)	6'10" (209)	(Greece) Panathinaikos
10	F	Georgios Printezis	February 22, 1985 (age 25)	6'9" (206)	(Spain) Unicaja
11	F	Stratos Perperoglou	August 7, 1984 (age 26)	6'8" (203)	(Greece) Panathinaikos
12	F	Kostas Tsartsaris	October 17, 1979 (age 30)	6'10" (209)	(Greece) Panathinaikos
13	G	Dimitris Diamantidis	May 6, 1980 (age 30)	6'6" (198)	(Greece) Panathinaikos
14	F	Kostas Kaimakoglou	March 15, 1983 (age 27)	6'9" (205)	(Greece) Panathinaikos
15	C	Sofoklis Schortsanitis	June 22, 1985 (age 25)	6'9" (206)	(Israel) Maccabi Tel Aviv

=== Puerto Rico ===
Head coach: (Puerto Rico) Manolo Cintrón

#	Pos	Name	Date of birth	Height	Club
4	C	Peter John Ramos	May 23, 1985 (age 25)	7'3" (220)	(Puerto Rico) Piratas de Quebradillas
5	G	José Juan Barea	June 26, 1984 (age 26)	6'0" (183)	(United States) Dallas Mavericks
6	G	Filiberto Rivera	September 28, 1982 (age 27)	6'2" (187)	(Puerto Rico) Gallitos de Isabela
7	G	Carlos Arroyo	July 30, 1979 (age 31)	6'2" (188)	(United States) Miami Heat
8	F	Ángel Daniel Vassallo	April 2, 1986 (age 24)	6'6" (198)	(France) ASVEL Lyon-Villeurbanne
9	G	Guillermo Diaz	March 4, 1985 (age 25)	6'2" (188)	(Italy) Pepsi Caserta
10	G	David Huertas	June 2, 1987 (age 23)	6'5" (195)	(Puerto Rico) Piratas de Quebradillas
11	F	Ricky Sánchez	July 6, 1987 (age 23)	6'11" (212)	(Puerto Rico) Cangrejeros de Santurce
12	F	Nathan Peavy	March 31, 1985 (age 25)	6'8" (203)	(Germany) Artland Dragons
13	F	Renaldo Balkman	July 14, 1984 (age 26)	6'8" (203)	(United States) Denver Nuggets
14	F	Carmelo Lee	June 7, 1977 (age 33)	6'7" (200)	(Puerto Rico) Vaqueros de Bayamón
15	C	Daniel Santiago	June 24, 1976 (age 34)	7'1" (216)	(Turkey) Efes Pilsen

=== Russia ===
Head coach: (United States) / (Israel) David Blatt

#	Pos	Name	Date of birth	Height	Club
4	F	Andrey Vorontsevich	July 17, 1987 (age 23)	6'9" (207)	(Russia) CSKA Moscow
5	G	Evgeny Kolesnikov	December 26, 1985 (age 24)	6'5" (196)	(Russia) Spartak Saint Petersburg
6	G	Sergei Bykov	February 26, 1983 (age 27)	6'3" (190)	(Russia) CSKA Moscow
7	G	Vitaly Fridzon	October 14, 1985 (age 24)	6'5" (195)	(Russia) Khimki
8	C	Alexander Kaun	May 8, 1985 (age 25)	6'11" (211)	(Russia) CSKA Moscow
9	F	Alexey Zhukanenko	May 18, 1986 (age 24)	6'11" (210)	(Russia) Dynamo Moscow
10	F	Victor Khryapa	August 3, 1982 (age 28)	6'9" (206)	(Russia) CSKA Moscow
11	G	Anton Ponkrashov	April 23, 1986 (age 24)	6'7" (200)	(Russia) Spartak Saint Petersburg
12	F	Sergei Monia	April 15, 1983 (age 27)	6'9" (205)	(Russia) Dynamo Moscow
13	G	Dmitry Khvostov	August 21, 1989 (age 21)	6'3" (190)	(Russia) Dynamo Moscow
14	G	Evgeny Voronov	May 7, 1986 (age 24)	6'4" (193)	(Russia) Krasnye Krylya Samara
15	C	Timofey Mozgov	July 16, 1986 (age 24)	7'1" (215)	(United States) New York Knicks

=== Turkey ===
Head coach: (Montenegro) / (Italy) Bogdan Tanjević

#	Pos	Name	Date of birth	Height	Club
4	G	Cenk Akyol	April 16, 1987 (age 23)	6'6" (197)	(Turkey) Efes Pilsen
5	G	Sinan Güler	November 8, 1983 (age 26)	6'4" (193)	(Turkey) Efes Pilsen
6	G	Barış Ermiş	January 3, 1985 (age 25)	6'4" (194)	(Turkey) Banvitspor
7	G	Ömer Onan	February 4, 1978 (age 32)	6'4" (194)	(Turkey) Fenerbahçe Ülker
8	F	Ersan İlyasova	May 15, 1987 (age 23)	6'10" (208)	(United States) Milwaukee Bucks
9	C	Semih Erden	July 28, 1986 (age 24)	6'11" (211)	(United States) Boston Celtics
10	G	Kerem Tunçeri	April 14, 1979 (age 31)	6'4" (194)	(Turkey) Efes Pilsen
11	C	Oğuz Savaş	July 13, 1987 (age 23)	6'10" (208)	(Turkey) Fenerbahçe Ülker
12	F	Kerem Gönlüm	November 22, 1977 (age 32)	6'10" (208)	(Turkey) Efes Pilsen
13	G	Ender Arslan	January 13, 1983 (age 27)	6'3" (190)	(Turkey) Efes Pilsen
14	C	Ömer Aşık	July 4, 1986 (age 24)	7'0" (214)	(United States) Chicago Bulls
15	F	Hidayet Türkoğlu	March 19, 1979 (age 31)	6'10" (208)	(United States) Phoenix Suns

== Group D ==
=== Canada ===
Head coach: (Canada) Leo Rautins

#	Pos	Name	Date of birth	Height	Club
4	G	Jermaine Anderson	February 8, 1983 (age 27)	6'2" (188)	(Russia) BC Triumph Lyubertsy
5	F	Kelly Olynyk	April 19, 1991 (age 19)	6'11" (211)	(United States) Gonzaga University
6	G	Ryan Bell	April 17, 1984 (age 26)	6'5" (195)	(Finland) Espoon Honka
7	F	Jermaine Bucknor	November 1, 1983 (age 26)	6'7" (201)	(France) Stade Clermontois
8	G	Denham Brown	January 6, 1983 (age 27)	6'5" (195)	(Poland) Asseco Prokom Gdynia
9	F	Olu Famutimi	February 21, 1984 (age 26)	6'6" (198)	(Turkey) Oyak Renault
10	G	Andy Rautins	November 2, 1986 (age 23)	6'5" (195)	(United States) New York Knicks
11	F	Aaron Doornekamp	December 5, 1985 (age 24)	6'7" (201)	(Italy) Pepsi Caserta
12	C	Robert Sacre	June 6, 1989 (age 21)	7'0" (213)	(United States) Gonzaga University
13	F	Jevohn Shepherd	April 8, 1986 (age 24)	6'6" (198)	(Germany) Giro-Live Ballers Osnabrück
14	F	Levon Kendall	July 4, 1984 (age 26)	6'10" (209)	(Greece) Maroussi
15	C	Joel Anthony	August 9, 1982 (age 28)	6'9" (206)	(United States) Miami Heat

=== France ===
Head coach: (France) Vincent Collet

#	Pos	Name	Date of birth	Height	Club
4	G	Andrew Albicy	March 21, 1990 (age 20)	5'10" (178)	(France) Paris-Levallois Basket
5	F	Nicolas Batum	December 14, 1988 (age 21)	6'8" (203)	(United States) Portland Trail Blazers
6	G	Fabien Causeur	June 16, 1987 (age 23)	6'4" (193)	(France) Cholet
7	F	Alain Koffi	November 23, 1983 (age 26)	6'9" (207)	(France) Le Mans
8	C	Ian Mahinmi	November 5, 1986 (age 23)	6'11" (211)	(United States) Dallas Mavericks
9	G	Edwin Jackson	September 18, 1989 (age 20)	6'3" (190)	(France) Rouen
10	G	Yannick Bokolo	June 19, 1985 (age 25)	6'3" (191)	(France) Gravelines
11	F	Florent Piétrus	January 19, 1981 (age 29)	6'8" (202)	(Spain) Power Electronics Valencia
12	G	Nando de Colo	June 23, 1987 (age 23)	6'5" (196)	(Spain) Power Electronics Valencia
13	F	Boris Diaw	April 16, 1982 (age 28)	6'8" (203)	(United States) Charlotte Bobcats
14	F	Mickaël Gelabale	May 22, 1983 (age 27)	6'7" (201)	(France) Cholet
15	F	Ali Traore	February 28, 1985 (age 25)	6'10" (208)	(Italy) Lottomatica Roma

=== Lebanon ===
Head coach: (United States) / (New Zealand) Tab Baldwin

#	Pos	Name	Date of birth	Height	Club
4	G	Jean Abdelnour	November 29, 1983 (age 26)	6'6" (199)	(Lebanon) Al-Riyadi
5	C	Jackson Vroman	June 6, 1981 (age 29)	6'10" (209)	(Iran) Mahram Tehran
6	G	Ali Mahmoud	May 28, 1983 (age 27)	6'0" (183)	(Lebanon) Al-Riyadi
7	G	Rony Fahed	November 6, 1981 (age 28)	6'1" (185)	(China) Tianjin Ronggang
8	F	Elie Rustom	May 2, 1987 (age 23)	6'6" (197)	(Lebanon) Al-Mouttahed
9	G	Elie Stephan	July 20, 1986 (age 24)	6'3" (191)	(Lebanon) Champville
10	C	Ali Kanaan	December 1, 1985 (age 24)	6'9" (206)	(United States) University of Massachusetts–Lowell
11	G	Rodrigue Akl	September 30, 1988 (age 21)	6'2" (189)	(Lebanon) Al-Riyadi
12	F	Ali Fakhreddine	April 3, 1983 (age 27)	6'8" (202)	(Lebanon) Al-Riyadi
13	F	Matt Freije	October 2, 1981 (age 28)	6'10" (208)	(Puerto Rico) Mets de Guaynabo
14	G	Ghaleb Rida	July 10, 1981 (age 29)	6'8" (204)	(Lebanon) Champville
15	F	Fadi El Khatib	January 1, 1979 (age 31)	6'6" (198)	(Lebanon) Champville

=== Lithuania ===
Head coach: (Lithuania) Kęstutis Kemzūra

#	Pos	Name	Date of birth	Height	Club
4	G	Renaldas Seibutis	July 23, 1985 (age 25)	6'6" (198)	(Spain) Bizkaia Bilbao Basket
5	G	Mantas Kalnietis	September 6, 1986 (age 23)	6'5" (195)	(Lithuania) Žalgiris
6	F	Jonas Mačiulis	February 10, 1985 (age 25)	6'7" (200)	(Italy) AJ Milano
7	G	Martynas Pocius	April 28, 1986 (age 24)	6'5" (196)	(Lithuania) Žalgiris
8	G	Martynas Gecevičius	May 16, 1988 (age 22)	6'4" (193)	(Lithuania) Lietuvos Rytas
9	G	Tomas Delininkaitis	June 11, 1982 (age 28)	6'3" (190)	(Greece) PAOK
10	F	Simas Jasaitis	March 26, 1982 (age 28)	6'7" (201)	(Turkey) Galatasaray Café Crown
11	F	Linas Kleiza	January 3, 1985 (age 25)	6'8" (203)	(Canada) Toronto Raptors
12	F	Tadas Klimavičius	October 10, 1982 (age 27)	6'8" (204)	(Lithuania) Žalgiris
13	F	Paulius Jankūnas	April 29, 1984 (age 26)	6'9" (206)	(Lithuania) Žalgiris
14	C	Martynas Andriuškevičius	March 12, 1986 (age 24)	7'2" (218)	(Spain) Meridiano Alicante
15	C	Robertas Javtokas	March 20, 1980 (age 30)	6'11" (211)	(Spain) Power Electronics Valencia

=== New Zealand ===
Head coach: (Serbia) / (New Zealand) Nenad Vučinić

#	Pos	Name	Date of birth	Height	Club
4	G	Lindsay Tait	January 8, 1982 (age 28)	6'4" (194)	(Australia) Cairns Taipans
5	G	Michael Fitchett	September 20, 1982 (age 27)	6'0" (183)	(New Zealand) Nelson Giants
6	G	Kirk Penney	November 23, 1980 (age 29)	6'5" (195)	New Zealand Breakers
7	F	Mika Vukona	May 13, 1982 (age 27)	6'6" (198)	New Zealand Breakers
8	G	Phill Jones	January 25, 1974 (age 36)	6'6" (197)	(Australia) Cairns Taipans
9	G	Jeremy Kench	April 27, 1984 (age 26)	6'1" (186)	(New Zealand) Christchurch Cougars
10	F	Thomas Abercrombie	July 5, 1987 (age 23)	6'6" (198)	New Zealand Breakers
11	F	Pero Cameron	June 5, 1974 (age 36)	6'6" (198)	(Australia) Gold Coast Blaze
12	F	Benny Anthony	July 20, 1988 (age 22)	6'6" (198)	New Zealand Breakers
13	F	Casey Frank	October 23, 1977 (age 32)	6'8" (203)	(New Zealand) Wellington Saints
14	C	Craig Bradshaw	July 28, 1983 (age 27)	6'9" (205)	(Latvia) VEF Riga
15	C	Alex Pledger	March 27, 1987 (age 23)	7'1" (216)	New Zealand Breakers

=== Spain ===
Head coach: (Italy) Sergio Scariolo

#	Pos	Name	Date of birth	Height	Club
4	F	Fernando San Emeterio	January 1, 1984 (age 26)	6'6" (197)	(Spain) Caja Laboral
5	G	Rudy Fernández	April 4, 1985 (age 25)	6'6" (198)	(United States) Portland Trail Blazers
6	G	Ricky Rubio	October 21, 1990 (age 19)	6'4" (192)	(United States) Minnesota Timberwolves
7	G	Juan Carlos Navarro	June 13, 1980 (age 30)	6'4" (192)	(Spain) Regal FC Barcelona
8	G	Raúl López	April 15, 1980 (age 30)	6'1" (186)	(Russia) Khimki
9	F	Felipe Reyes	March 16, 1980 (age 30)	6'9" (206)	(Spain) Real Madrid
10	F	Víctor Claver	August 30, 1988 (age 21)	6'9" (207)	(Spain) Power Electronics Valencia
11	C	Fran Vázquez	May 1, 1983 (age 27)	6'10" (209)	(Spain) Regal FC Barcelona
12	G	Sergio Llull	November 15, 1987 (age 22)	6'4" (192)	(Spain) Real Madrid
13	C	Marc Gasol	January 29, 1985 (age 25)	7'1" (216)	(United States) Memphis Grizzlies
14	F	Álex Mumbrú	June 12, 1979 (age 31)	6'8" (202)	(Spain) Bizkaia Bilbao Basket
15	F	Jorge Garbajosa	December 19, 1977 (age 32)	6'9" (207)	(Spain) Real Madrid

== Player statistics ==
The following tables list the player participation by national domestic league systems and the most represented clubs at the time of the tournament. League totals include players playing in all levels of each country's basketball league system. Whenever possible, links go to the highest professional league of the associated country.

The United States' total includes 41 professional NBA players (three of whom played for the Toronto Raptors, based in Canada), seven amateur NCAA players, and one amateur NJCAA player.

The total for Australia includes four players on the New Zealand squad who played for the New Zealand Breakers, a team that has competed in Australia's National Basketball League since 2003. For consistency, the New Zealand total includes only players who competed in that country's National Basketball League.

Player representation by national domestic league

Country	Players	Outside national squad
United States	49	37
Spain	31	22
Greece	19	10
Russia	17	6
Turkey	17	9
Germany	14	5
Angola	12	0
China	12	2
France	12	6
Iran	12	2
Jordan	11	0
Italy	9	9
Lebanon	9	1
Tunisia	9	0
Australia	8	6
Argentina	7	1
Brazil	7	0
Lithuania	6	1
New Zealand	5	0
Puerto Rico	5	1
Serbia	5	3
Croatia	3	0
Poland	2	2
(Ivory Coast) Côte d'Ivoire	1	0
Finland, Israel, Latvia, Morocco, Switzerland, (United Arab Emirates) UAE (1 each)	6	6
Total	288	129

Player representation by club

Players	Clubs
9	(Greece) Panathinaikos
7	(Angola) Primeiro de Agosto, (Jordan) Zain, (Turkey) Efes Pilsen
6	(Spain) Real Madrid
5	(Greece) Olympiacos, (Spain) Regal FC Barcelona, (Spain) Power Electronics Valencia, (Turkey) Fenerbahçe Ülker
4	(Lebanon) Al-Riyadi, New Zealand Breakers, (Russia) Khimki, (Russia) CSKA Moscow, (Lithuania) Žalgiris
3	(Angola) Recreativo Libolo, (Canada) Toronto Raptors, (China) Guangdong Southern Tigers, (Jordan) Applied Science University, (Lebanon) Champville SC, (Russia) Dynamo Moscow, (Spain) Caja Laboral, (Spain) Bizkaia Bilbao Basket, (Tunisia) ÉS Sahel, (Tunisia) Stade Nabeulien, (United States) Milwaukee Bucks, (United States) Portland Trail Blazers, (United States) Oklahoma City Thunder, (United States) Gonzaga University, (Brazil) Universo de Brasília

== See also ==
- 2010 Wheelchair Basketball World Championship squads
