= Fred Oniga =

Nigerian basketball coach

Fredrick Femi Oniga is a Nigerian basketball coach. In 2011 he coached the Applied Science University (ASU) from Jordan in the 2011 FIBA Asia Champions Cup.

== Teams coached ==
- (Nigeria) Niger Potters
- (Syria) Al Jalaa (2001)
- Nigeria national basketball team (Assistant Coach, 2003)
- (Jordan) Al Jazeera Amman (2005)
- Iran national basketball team (2006)
- (Syria) Al-Ittihad
- Jordan national basketball team (2007)
- (Bahrain) Al-Ahli (2007–08)
- (Jordan) Applied Science University (2011)
