= Ricardo Marsh =

American basketball player

Personal information
- Born: September 12, 1981 (age 45) Mebane, North Carolina, U.S.
- Listed height: 6 ft 8 in (2.03 m)
- Listed weight: 240 lb (109 kg)

Career information
- High school: Orange (Hillsborough, North Carolina)
- College: Old Dominion (1999–2003)
- NBA draft: 2003: undrafted
- Playing career: 2003–2015
- Position: Power forward
- Coaching career: 2021–present

Career history

Playing
- 2003–2004: Büyük Kolej
- 2004: Dukagjini Pejë
- 2004–2005: Toyota Alvark
- 2005–2006: Türk Telekom
- 2006–2007: Elitzur Ashkelon
- 2007–2008: Antalya BB
- 2008: ASK Riga
- 2009: Antalya BB
- 2009: Donetsk
- 2010: Cedevita Zagreb
- 2010–2011: Crvena zvezda
- 2011–2013: Hacettepe Üniversitesi
- 2013: Gaiteros del Zulia
- 2013: Duhok SC
- 2013: Caciques de Humacao
- 2013: Duhok SC
- 2013: Maccabi Rishon LeZion
- 2014: Club Atlético Lanús
- 2014: Bucaneros de La Guaira
- 2014–2015: Al Wasl Dubai

Coaching
- 2021-present: Virginia State Trojans (assistant)

Career highlights
- Israeli League Top Scorer (2007); Turkish League All-Star (2008)

Ricardo Marsh (born September 12, 1981) is an American college basketball coach and former professional player. He was the top scorer in the Israel Basketball Premier League in 2007 and is currently assistant men's basketball coach at Virginia State University.

== College career ==
Marsh played college basketball at the Old Dominion University from 1999 to 2003.

== Professional career ==
In July 2003, he signed with Büyük Kolej of the Turkish Basketball League for the 2003–04 season. In May 2004, he signed with Dukagjini Pejë of the Kosovo Basketball League for the rest of the season.

In August 2004, he signed with Toyota Alvark of the Japan Basketball League for the 2004–05 season. In July 2005, he returned to Turkey and signed with Türk Telekom B.K. for the 2005–06 season.

In November 2006, he signed with Elitzur Ashkelon of the Israeli Basketball Super League for the 2006–07 season. He was the top scorer in the Israel Basketball Premier League in 2007.

For the 2007–08 season he signed with Antalya Büyükşehir Belediyesi. In September 2008, he signed with ASK Riga of Latvia. He left them in December 2008, and returned to Antalya Büyükşehir Belediyesi.

In the summer of 2009, he signed with BC Donetsk of Ukraine. He left them in December 2009. In February 2010, he signed with Cedevita Zagreb of Croatia for the rest of the 2009–10 season.

In November 2010, he signed with Crvena zvezda of Serbia for the 2010–11 season. He parted ways with Zvezda in March 2011.

In July 2011, he signed with Hacettepe Üniversitesi. He stayed there till April 2013, when he signed with Gaiteros del Zulia in Venezuela.

On May 10, 2013, he signed with Duhok SC of the Iraqi Basketball Premier League. On May 28, 2013, he signed with Caciques de Humacao. In September he returned to Duhok SC and played 6 games on the 2013 FIBA Asia Champions Cup.

On October 2, 2013, he signed with Maccabi Rishon LeZion of Israel. He was released on November 14, 2013, after playing six games with the club. In January 2014, he signed with Club Atlético Lanús. On February 28, 2014, he signed with Bucaneros de La Guaira of Venezuela for the remainder of the season. On April 4, 2014, he was released by Bucaneros.

On November 28, 2014, Marsh signed with Al Wasl Dubai of United Arab Emirates.

== Coaching career ==
In September 2021, Marsh was hired as an assistant men's basketball coach for the Virginia State Trojans, an NCAA Division II team of the Central Intercollegiate Athletic Association (CIAA).
