= C. J. Giles =

American-Bahraini basketball player

No. 12 – Ezzahra Sports
- Position: Center
- League: Championnat National A

Personal information
- Born: September 23, 1985 (age 41) Seattle, Washington
- Listed height: 6 ft 11 in (2.11 m)
- Listed weight: 240 lb (109 kg)

Career information
- High school: Rainier Beach (Seattle, Washington)
- College: Kansas (2004–2006); Oregon State (2007–2008)
- NBA draft: 2008: undrafted
- Playing career: 2008–present

Career history
- 2008–2009: Los Angeles D-Fenders
- 2009: Sioux Falls Skyforce
- 2009: Smart Gilas
- 2009–2010: Sporting Al Riyadi Beirut
- 2011: Al-Ittihad Jeddah
- 2011: Petrochimi Bandar Imam
- 2011: Duhok
- 2011: Chabab Zahle
- 2011–2013: Al-Muharraq
- 2013–2014: Amchit Club
- 2014: Al-Muharraq
- 2014–2015: Sitra Club
- 2015: Shaanxi Xinda
- 2015: Westchester Knicks
- 2016: Al-Ahli
- 2017–2018: Pelita Jaya Energi Mega Persada
- 2019: Aldar Tanan Garid
- 2019–2021: Al-Najma SC
- 2021–present: Ezzahra Sports

Career highlights
- Bahrain League champion (2012); Bahrain Cup champion (2012); FLB League champion (2010); MBA League champion (2019); Perbasi Cup (2017); Indonesian Basketball League All-Star (2018); MVP Indonesian Basketball League All-Star (2018); Most Defensive Player of the Year IBL (2018); Top Block Indonesian Basketball League (2018)

Chester Jarell Giles (born September 23, 1985) is an American-Bahraini professional basketball player for Ezzahra Sports of the Championnat National A, as well as national player for Bahrain. He previously played for Pelita Jaya Basketball of the Indonesian Basketball League. He played high school basketball for Rainier Beach High School and college basketball for the University of Kansas and Oregon State University.

== College career ==
Kansas Jayhawks Men's basketball. In January 2007, Giles transferred to Oregon State where he began practicing with the Beavers but could not play due to NCAA transfer regulations. In April 2008, he declared as an early entry candidate for the 2008 NBA draft, foregoing his final year of college eligibility.

== Professional career ==
=== 2008–09 season ===
After going undrafted in the 2008 NBA draft, Giles joined the Toronto Raptors for the 2008 NBA Summer League. On September 12, 2008, he signed with the Los Angeles Lakers. However, he was later waived by the Lakers on October 22, 2008. On December 16, 2008, he was acquired by the Los Angeles D-Fenders. On March 5, 2009, he was traded to the Sioux Falls Skyforce in exchange for Earl Barron.

=== 2009–10 season ===
In July 2009, Giles joined the Orlando Magic for the Orlando Summer League and the Denver Nuggets for the Las Vegas Summer League. On August 22, 2009, he signed with Smart Gilas of the Philippine Basketball Association. However, he was later released by Smart Gilas on November 16, 2009, after just two Philippine Cup games. Three days later, he signed with Sporting Al Riyadi Beirut of Lebanon for the 2009–10 season.

=== 2010–11 season ===
In July 2010, Giles joined the Golden State Warriors for the 2010 NBA Summer League. On February 12, 2011, he signed with Al-Ittihad Jeddah of the Saudi Premier League. In April 2011, he left Al-Ittihad and signed with Petrochimi Bandar Imam of Iran for the 2010–11 Iranian Basketball Super League playoffs. In May 2011, he left Petrochimi following the playoffs and joined Duhok of Iraq for the 2011 FIBA Asia Champions Cup.

=== 2011–12 season ===
On October 29, 2011, Giles signed with Chabab Zahle of Lebanon for the 2011–12 season. However, less than a month later, the club withdrew from the Lebanese Basketball League after seven consecutive losses to start the season. He subsequently signed with Al-Muharraq of Bahrain for the rest of the season.

=== 2012–13 season ===
In August 2012, Giles re-signed with Al-Muharraq for the 2012–13 season.

=== 2013–14 season ===
In September 2013, Giles signed with Amchit Club of Lebanon for the 2013–14 season. In January 2014, he left Amchit and re-joined Al-Muharraq for the rest of the season.

=== 2014–15 season ===
On November 3, 2014, Giles was acquired by the Texas Legends. However, he was later waived by the Legends on November 13, 2014.

=== 2015–16 ===
On November 2, 2015, Giles was acquired by the Westchester Knicks. On November 24, he was waived by the Knicks after appearing in four games. On January 27, 2016, he returned to Bahrain, joining Al-Ahli.

=== 2017–18 ===
Giles was acquired by the Pelita Jaya Basketball through Indonesian Basketball League import player draft.

=== 2019–21 ===
Giles plays for the Bahraini National Team as well as on the roster for the season at Al Najma (Bahrain).

=== 2021–22 ===
On September 15, 2021, Giles signed with Ezzahra Sports of the Championnat National A.

== International career ==
After becoming a naturalized citizen of Bahrain, Giles competed for the country's national team at the 2013 FIBA Asia Championship in August 2013, and for 2021 FIBA Asia Cup qualifiers.

== Personal ==
Giles is the son of Chester Giles Sr. and Gail Gails, and has two older sisters and one young brother, Malcolm. He has eldest son Jayden from Kansas who is an athlete in his own right.

His father played at Kansas from 1979 to 1980.
