= 2013 FIBA Asia Champions Cup =

24th Asia Champions Cup
- Official logo

Tournament details
- Host country: Jordan
- Dates: September 13–21
- Teams: 8 (from 44 federations)
- Venue: 1 (in 1 host city)

Final positions
- Champions: Iran (Foolad Mahan's 1st title; Iran's 5th title)

Tournament statistics
- Top scorer: (United States) Wright (29.3)
- Top rebounds: (Iran) Haddadi (12.3)
- Top assists: (United States) Taylor (7.0)
- PPG (Team): (Iran) Foolad Mahan (106.5)
- RPG (Team): (Iran) Foolad Mahan (45.8)
- APG (Team): (Iran) Foolad Mahan (14.8)

Official website
- 2013 FIBA Asia Champions Cup

The 2013 FIBA Asia Champions Cup was the 24th staging of the FIBA Asia Champions Cup, the international basketball club tournament of FIBA Asia. The tournament was held in Amman, Jordan in September 13–21, 2013. The main venue was the Prince Hamzah Court. This marked the first occasion when Jordan have hosted any FIBA Asia event.

Foolad Mahan from Iran, after going undefeated in the entire tournament, won its first ever FIBA Asia Champions Cup title after defeating Al-Rayyan from Qatar in the final game, 84–74. It was the fifth time a club from Iran has won the championship.

ASU from the hosts Jordan, on the other hand, finished third in the tournament after defeating Al-Hala from Bahrain in the third-place game, 107-76.

== Qualification ==
According to the FIBA Asia rules, the number of participating teams in the FIBA Asia Champions Cup is ten. Each of the six FIBA ASIA Sub-Zones had one place, and the host was automatically qualified. The other three places are allocated to the zones according to performance in the 2012 FIBA Asia Champions Cup.

Central Asia (1)	East Asia (1)	Gulf (1+1)	South Asia (1)	Southeast Asia (1)	West Asia (1+1+1+1)
(Kazakhstan) Kapchagay	~~(Mongolia) Khas Bronchos~~ *	(Bahrain) Al-Hala	(India) ONGC	~~(Philippines) San Miguel~~ *	(Jordan) ASU
		(Qatar) Al-Rayyan			(Iran) Foolad Mahan
					(Iraq) Duhok
					(Syria) Al-Jaish

* Withdrew.

== Preliminary round ==
=== Group A ===
Team	Pld	W	L	PF	PA	PD	Pts
(Iran) Foolad Mahan Isfahan	3	3	0	330	239	+91	6
(Jordan) ASU	3	2	1	286	249	+37	5
(Bahrain) Al-Hala	3	1	2	287	344	−57	4
(Syria) Al-Jaish	3	0	3	216	287	−71	3

September 13
19:00

Report

Al-Hala (Bahrain)	81–113	(Jordan) ASU
Scoring by quarter: 19–32, 22–23, 19–32, 21–26
Pts: Wright 30; Rebs: Jones 10; Asts: A. Mohamed, Wright 2		Pts: Douby 24; Rebs: Daniels 13; Asts: Douby, Al-Sous 4

Prince Hamzah Court, Amman
Referees: Mohammad Al-Amiri (KUW), Yevgeniy Mikheyev (KAZ), Ahmed Al-Suwaili (IRQ)

September 14
16:00

Report

Al-Jaish (Syria)	56–91	(Iran) Foolad Mahan Isfahan
Scoring by quarter: 15–30, 17–15, 8–26, 16–20
Pts: Abdullah 14; Rebs: Saddir 8 Asts: Five players 1		Pts: Haddadi 28; Rebs: Haddadi 19; Asts: Kamrani 5

Prince Hamzah Court, Amman
Referees: Hatim Al-Harbi (KSA), Ahmed Al-Suwaili (IRQ), Hamlet Arakelyan (KAZ)

September 15
18:00

Report

Al-Hala (Bahrain)	106–89	(Syria) Al-Jaish
Scoring by quarter: 21–24, 27–22, 22–15, 36–28
Pts: Jones 33; Rebs: Jones 10; Asts: Wright 7		Pts: Abdullah 18; Rebs: Saddir 13; Asts: Shaban 4

Prince Hamzah Court, Amman
Referees: Mohammad Al-Amiri (KUW), Yevgeniy Mikheyev (KAZ), Ahmed Al-Suwaili (IRQ)

September 16
16:00

Report

Foolad Mahan Isfahan (Iran)	142–100	(Bahrain) Al-Hala
Scoring by quarter: 39–21, 24–29, 40–24, 39–26
Pts: Kamrani 27; Rebs: Sahakian 9 Asts: Davoudi 5		Pts: Wright 51; Rebs: Wright 7 Asts: Nesaif 2

Prince Hamzah Court, Amman
Referees: Ahmed Al-Suwaili (IRQ), Hamlet Arakelyan (KAZ), Naser Abu Rashed (JOR)

September 16
20:00

Report

Al-Jaish (Syria)	71–90	(Jordan) ASU
Scoring by quarter: 17–26, 19–16, 13–25, 22–23
Pts: Abdullah 19; Rebs: Yakoub 11; Asts: Shaban 4		Pts: Douby 22; Rebs: Daniels 15; Asts: Douby 6

Prince Hamzah Court, Amman
Referees: Mohammad Al-Amiri (KUW), Hatim Al-Harbi (KSA), Yevgeniy Mikheyev (KAZ)

September 17
20:00

Report

ASU (Jordan)	83–97	(Iran) Foolad Mahan Isfahan
Scoring by quarter: 31–29, 22–23, 16–28, 14–17
Pts: Douby 23; Rebs: Hadrab 10; Asts: Douby, Daniels, Al-Sous 2		Pts: Haddadi 26; Rebs: Haddadi 17; Asts: Bečirovič 5

Prince Hamzah Court, Amman
Referees: Yevgeniy Mikheyev (KAZ), Hatim Al-Harbi (KSA), Hamlet Arakelyan (KAZ)

=== Group B ===
Team	Pld	W	L	PF	PA	PD	Pts
(Qatar) Al-Rayyan	3	3	0	254	194	+60	6
(Iraq) Duhok	3	2	1	257	241	+16	5
(Kazakhstan) Kapchagay	3	1	2	229	242	−13	4
(India) ONGC Dehradun	3	0	3	200	263	−63	3

September 13
16:00

Report

Al-Rayyan (Qatar)	81–67	(Kazakhstan) Kapchagay
Scoring by quarter: 11–18, 20–12, 27–18, 23–19
Pts: Watson 19; Rebs: Ismail, Abdelqader, Mofunanya 6 Asts: Watson 4		Pts: Kozhanov 13; Rebs: Fadeikin 8 Asts: Adamu, Seleznyov, Kozhanov 3

Prince Hamzah Court, Amman
Referees: Amir Hossein Safarzadeh (IRI), Hatim Al-Harbi (KSA), Abdulkarim Shakeeb (BRN)

September 14
18:00

Report

Kapchagay (Kazakhstan)	79–72	(India) ONGC Dehradun
Scoring by quarter: 25–24, 26–14, 12–15, 16–19
Pts: Fadeikin 22; Rebs: Fadeikin 8 Asts: Adamu, McKay 2		Pts: A. Singh 20; Rebs: Bhriguvanshi, Y. Singh 9 Asts: Bhriguvanshi 3

Prince Hamzah Court, Amman
Referees: Mohammad Al-Amiri (KUW), Ibrahim Jerrar (JOR), Antwan Ashji (SYR)

September 14
20:00

Report

Duhok (Iraq)	69–88	(Qatar) Al-Rayyan
Scoring by quarter: 19–21, 14–29, 18–13, 18–25
Pts: Taylor 20; Rebs: Hatem 14; Asts: Taylor 6		Pts: Watson 34; Rebs: Mofunanya 15; Asts: Watson 4

Prince Hamzah Court, Amman
Referees: Naser Abu Rashed (JOR), Amir Hossein Safarzadeh (IRI), Haytham Al-Kouja (SYR)

September 15
18:00

Report

ONGC Dehradun (India)	70–99	(Iraq) Duhok
Scoring by quarter: 22–25, 20–23, 15–25, 13–26
Pts: Bhriguvanshi 26; Rebs: A. Singh 14; Asts: Rai 2		Pts: Taylor 28; Rebs: Marsh 11; Asts: Taylor 9

Prince Hamzah Court, Amman
Referees: Haytham Al-Kouja (SYR), Abdulkarim Shakeeb (BRN), Hatim Al-Harbi (KSA)

September 16
18:00

Report

Al-Rayyan (Qatar)	85–58	(India) ONGC Dehradun
Scoring by quarter: 24–7, 17–19, 23–18, 21–14
Pts: Mofunanya 16; Rebs: Mofunanya 14; Asts: Mofunanya 6		Pts: A. Singh 16; Rebs: A. Singh 9 Asts: Bhriguvanshi 3

Prince Hamzah Court, Amman
Referees: Abdulkarim Shakeeb (BRN), Antwan Ashji (SYR), Ibrahim Jerrar (JOR)

September 17
16:00

Report

Kapchagay (Kazakhstan)	83–89	(Iraq) Duhok
Scoring by quarter: 26–21, 23–22, 17–23, 17–23
Pts: Degtyarev 19; Rebs: Fadeikin 10; Asts: Adamu, Kozhanov 3		Pts: Marsh 28; Rebs: Marsh 9 Asts: Taylor 7

Prince Hamzah Court, Amman
Referees: Haytham Al-Kouja (SYR), Naser Abu Rashed (JOR), Amir Hossein Safarzadeh (IRI)

== Final round ==
Quarterfinals
September 19
(Qatar) Al-Rayyan	82
(Syria) Al-Jaish	71
September 19
(Jordan) ASU	101
(Kazakhstan) Kapchagay	78
September 19
(Iraq) Duhok	99
(Bahrain) Al-Hala	103
September 19
(Iran) Foolad Mahan	104
(India) ONGC	56

Semifinals
September 20
(Qatar) Al-Rayyan	71
(Jordan) ASU	67
September 20
(Bahrain) Al-Hala	73
(Iran) Foolad Mahan	121

Final
September 21
(Qatar) Al-Rayyan	74
(Iran) Foolad Mahan	84
3rd place
September 21
(Jordan) ASU	107
(Bahrain) Al-Hala	76

Semifinals
September 20
(Syria) Al-Jaish	82
(Kazakhstan) Kapchagay	77
September 20
(Iraq) Duhok	85
(India) ONGC	82

5th place
September 21
(Syria) Al-Jaish	95
(Iraq) Duhok	97
7th place
September 21
(Kazakhstan) Kapchagay	101
(India) ONGC	74

=== Quarterfinals ===
September 19
14:00

Report

Al-Rayyan (Qatar)	82–71	(Syria) Al-Jaish
Scoring by quarter: 18–17, 18–22, 25–12, 21–20
Pts: Ismail 21; Rebs: Ismail 9 Asts: Suliman, Mofunanya 3		Pts: Yakoub 14; Rebs: Saleh 7 Asts: Shaban, Al-Haddad 3

Prince Hamzah Court, Amman
Referees: Abdulkarim Shakeeb (BRN), Ahmed Al-Suwaili (IRQ), Mohammed Al-Tarawneh (JOR)

September 19
16:00

Report

Duhok (Iraq)	99–103	(Bahrain) Al-Hala
Scoring by quarter: 27–23, 21–25, 20–22, 31–33
Pts: Taylor 22; Rebs: Dheyaa 12; Asts: Taylor 6		Pts: Wright 29; Rebs: Jones 8 Asts: Wright 4

Prince Hamzah Court, Amman
Referees: Naser Abu Rashed (JOR), Haytham Al-Kouja (SYR), Hamlet Arakelyan (KAZ)

September 19
18:00

Report

Foolad Mahan Isfahan (Iran)	104–56	(India) ONGC Dehradun
Scoring by quarter: 33–8, 41–12, 13–20, 17–16
Pts: Kamrani, Asselin 20; Rebs: Asselin 11; Asts: Kamrani 6		Pts: Bhriguvanshi 20; Rebs: A. Singh 7 Asts: Ravindran 2

Prince Hamzah Court, Amman
Referees: Yevgeniy Mikheyev (KAZ), Ibrahim Jerrar (JOR), Antwan Ashji (SYR)

September 19
20:00

Report

ASU (Jordan)	101–78	(Kazakhstan) Kapchagay
Scoring by quarter: 35–22, 22–23, 28–19, 16–14
Pts: Douby 27; Rebs: Adais 16; Asts: Douby, Al-Sous 3		Pts: Adamu 19; Rebs: Orazov 8 Asts: Adamu 7

Prince Hamzah Court, Amman
Referees: Mohammad Al-Amiri (KUW), Hatim Al-Harbi (KSA), Amir Hossein Safarzadeh (IRI)

=== Semifinals 5th–8th ===
September 20
14:00

Report

Duhok (Iraq)	85–82	(India) ONGC Dehradun
Scoring by quarter: 21–20, 22–25, 22–25, 20–12
Pts: Marsh 29; Rebs: Marsh 10; Asts: Taylor 5		Pts: A. Singh 26; Rebs: A. Singh 17; Asts: Bhriguvanshi 4

Prince Hamzah Court, Amman
Referees: Hatim Al-Harbi (KSA), Mohammed Al-Tarawneh (JOR), Amir Hossein Safarzadeh (IRI)

September 20
16:00

Report

Al-Jaish (Syria)	82–77	(Kazakhstan) Kapchagay
Scoring by quarter: 19–15, 16–21, 28–29, 19–12
Pts: Abdullah 28; Rebs: Abdullah, Yakoub 7 Asts: Shaban 3		Pts: McKay, Fadeikin 12; Rebs: Fadeikin 11; Asts: Adamu 6

Prince Hamzah Court, Amman
Referees: Naser Abu Rashed (JOR), Abdulkarim Shakeeb (BRN), Ibrahim Jerrar (JOR)

=== Semifinals ===
September 20
18:00

Report

Al-Rayyan (Qatar)	71–67	(Jordan) ASU
Scoring by quarter: 14–10, 19–19, 16–18, 22–20
Pts: Watson 27; Rebs: Saleem, Mofunanya 6 Asts: Watson 3		Pts: Al-Sous 14; Rebs: Daniels 14; Asts: Al-Sous 4

Prince Hamzah Court, Amman
Referees: Haytham Al-Kouja (SYR), Mohammad Al-Amiri (KUW), Yevgeniy Mikheyev (KAZ)

September 20
20:00

Report

Al-Hala (Bahrain)	73–121	(Iran) Foolad Mahan Isfahan
Scoring by quarter: 23–23, 22–27, 17–26, 11–45
Pts: Jones 21; Rebs: Jones 7 Asts: Ghuloom 4		Pts: Asselin 21; Rebs: Sahakian 15; Asts: Haddadi 5

Prince Hamzah Court, Amman
Referees: Ahmed Al-Suwaili (IRQ), Hamlet Arakelyan (KAZ), Antwan Ashji (SYR)

=== 7th place ===
September 21
12:00

Report

Kapchagay (Kazakhstan)	101–74	(India) ONGC Dehradun
Scoring by quarter: 27–19, 21–19, 24–18, 29–18
Pts: Adamu 21; Rebs: Bykov 14; Asts: McKay 3		Pts: Bhriguvanshi 32; Rebs: Bhriguvanshi, A. Singh 7 Asts: Bhriguvanshi 4

Prince Hamzah Court, Amman
Referees: Antwan Ashji (SYR), Abdulkarim Shakeeb (BRN), Fuad Shoqair (JOR)

=== 5th place ===
September 21
14:00

Report

Duhok (Iraq)	97–95	(Syria) Al-Jaish
Scoring by quarter: 33–24, 23–24, 12–21, 29–26
Pts: Marsh 26; Rebs: Marsh 14; Asts: Taylor 9		Pts: Abdullah 23; Rebs: Abdullah 10; Asts: Shaban, Al-Shatti 3

Prince Hamzah Court, Amman
Referees: Ibrahim Jerrar (JOR), Amir Hossein Safarzadeh (IRI), Mohammed Al-Tarawneh (JOR)

=== 3rd place ===
September 21
16:00

Report

ASU (Jordan)	107–76	(Bahrain) Al-Hala
Scoring by quarter: 34–17, 30–18, 18–28, 25–13
Pts: Al-Hamarsheh 29; Rebs: Adais 15; Asts: Abdeen 9		Pts: Wright 26; Rebs: Jones 10; Asts: Wright 3

Prince Hamzah Court, Amman
Referees: Hatim Al-Harbi (KSA), Ahmed Al-Suwaili (IRQ), Haytham Al-Kouja (SYR)

=== Final ===
September 21
18:00

Report

Al-Rayyan (Qatar)	74–84	(Iran) Foolad Mahan Isfahan
Scoring by quarter: 19–18, 16–23, 28–17, 11–26
Pts: Watson 27; Rebs: Ismail 10; Asts: Watson, Ismail 4		Pts: Kamrani 21; Rebs: Haddadi 14; Asts: Davoudi, Kamrani 4

Prince Hamzah Court, Amman
Referees: Mohammad Al-Amiri (KUW), Yevgeniy Mikheyev (KAZ), Naser Abu Rashed (JOR)

== Final standing ==
Rank	Team	Record
1st place, gold medalist(s)	(Iran) Foolad Mahan Isfahan	6–0
2nd place, silver medalist(s)	(Qatar) Al-Rayyan	5–1
3rd place, bronze medalist(s)	(Jordan) ASU	4–2
4	(Bahrain) Al-Hala	2–4
5	(Iraq) Duhok	4–2
6	(Syria) Al-Jaish	1–5
7	(Kazakhstan) Kapchagay	2–4
8	(India) ONGC Dehradun	0–6
