= Ryan Forehan-Kelly =

American professional basketball coach & former player (born 1980)

Brooklyn Nets
- Title: Assistant coach
- League: NBA

Personal information
- Born: January 14, 1980 (age 46) Long Beach, California, U.S.
- Listed height: 6 ft 6 in (1.98 m)
- Listed weight: 205 lb (93 kg)

Career information
- High school: Santa Margarita (Santa Margarita, California)
- College: California (1998–2002)
- NBA draft: 2002: undrafted
- Playing career: 2003–2016
- Position: Shooting guard / small forward

Career history

Playing
- 2004: Juárez Gallos de Pelea
- 2004: Guaiqueríes de Margarita
- 2004–2005: Jiangsu Dragons
- 2005–2006: Brest
- 2006–2007: Besançon
- 2007–2008: Jiangsu Dragons
- 2008–2009: Los Angeles D-Fenders
- 2009: Scafati
- 2009–2010: Los Angeles D-Fenders
- 2010: Toros de Aragua
- 2010–2011: Aishin Sea Horses
- 2011: Applied Science University
- 2011–2012: Shanghai Sharks
- 2013: Cocodrilos de Caracas
- 2014–2015: Kyoto Hannaryz

Coaching
- 2017–2020: Long Island Nets (associate HC)
- 2020–present: Brooklyn Nets (assistant)

Ryan Forehan-Kelly (born January 14, 1980) is an American professional basketball coach and former player who serves as assistant coach for the Brooklyn Nets of the National Basketball Association (NBA).

== Playing career ==
Forehan-Kelly played for the California Golden Bears. Forehan-Kelly played internationally and in the NBA D-League (now G League).

== Coaching career ==
Forehan-Kelly was hired as an assistant coach by the Long Island Nets for the 2017–18 NBA G League season. In December 2020, Forehan-Kelly was named as assistant coach for the Brooklyn Nets.
