= 2012 FIBA Asia Champions Cup =

23rd Asia Champions Cup
- Official logo

Tournament details
- Host country: Lebanon
- Dates: October 15–22
- Teams: 5
- Venue(s): 1 (in 1 host city)

Official website
- 2012 FIBA Asia Champions Cup

The FIBA Asia Champions Cup 2012 was the 23rd staging of the FIBA Asia Champions Cup, the international basketball club tournament of FIBA Asia. The tournament was held in Beirut, Lebanon in October 15–22, 2012.

== Qualification ==
According to the FIBA Asia rules, each zone had one place, and the hosts was automatically qualified. The other three places are allocated to the zones according to performance in the 2011 FIBA Asia Champions Cup.

The Syrian civil war spillover in Lebanon is the reason why only five teams took part.

| Central Asia (1) | East Asia (1) | Gulf (1+1) | South Asia (1) | Southeast Asia (1+1) | West Asia (1+1+1) |
|---|---|---|---|---|---|
| (Turkmenistan) Belent | (Mongolia) Falcons | ~~(Qatar) Al-Rayyan~~ * | ~~TBD~~ * | ~~(Indonesia) Warriors~~ * | (Lebanon) Al-Riyadi |
| | | ~~(United Arab Emirates) Al-Shabab~~ * | | ~~(Philippines) San Miguel~~ * | (Iran) Mahram |
| | | | | | (Iraq) Duhok |

* Withdrew

== Preliminary round ==
| Team | Pld | W | L | PF | PA | PD | Pts |
|---|---|---|---|---|---|---|---|
| (Lebanon) Al-Riyadi Beirut | 4 | 4 | 0 | 400 | 221 | +179 | 8 |
| (Iran) Mahram Tehran | 4 | 3 | 1 | 393 | 277 | +116 | 7 |
| (Iraq) Duhok | 4 | 2 | 2 | 290 | 326 | −36 | 6 |
| (Turkmenistan) Belent Ashgabat | 4 | 1 | 3 | 298 | 390 | −92 | 5 |
| (Mongolia) Energy R. Falcons | 4 | 0 | 4 | 249 | 416 | −167 | 4 |

October 15
17:00

Report

| Belent Ashgabat (Turkmenistan) | 54–116 | (Lebanon) Al-Riyadi Beirut |
Scoring by quarter: 10–35, 6–29, 19–24, 19–28
| Pts: Kozlov 21; Rebs: Mazurow, Kozlov 5 Asts: Four players 1 | | Pts: Saoud 23; Rebs: Woods, Tabbara 6 Asts: Abdelnour, Mahmoud, Martinez 3 |

Saeb Salam Arena, Beirut
Referees: Arsen Andryushkin (KAZ), Amir Hossein Safarzadeh (IRI), Ahmed Al-Suwaili (IRQ)

October 15
19:30

Report

| Energy Resources Falcons (Mongolia) | 66–121 | (Iran) Mahram Tehran |
Scoring by quarter: 17–46, 16–25, 17–31, 16–19
| Pts: Nemekhbayar 18; Rebs: Bolortulga 5 Asts: Odbayar 5 | | Pts: Nikkhah 21; Rebs: Nikkhah 10; Asts: Nikkhah 11 |

Saeb Salam Arena, Beirut
Referees: Marwan Egho (LIB), Yevgeniy Mikheyev (KAZ), Anton Kozlov (KAZ)

October 16
17:00

Report

| Al-Riyadi Beirut (Lebanon) | 100–53 | (Mongolia) Energy Resources Falcons |
Scoring by quarter: 28–14, 33–7, 16–15, 23–17
| Pts: Ibrahim 18; Rebs: Kanaan 9 Asts: Ahmed 5 | | Pts: Mönkhtüvshin 16; Rebs: Zolzaya 7 Asts: Zolzaya 3 |

Saeb Salam Arena, Beirut
Referees: Heros Avanesian (IRI), Ahmed Al-Suwaili (IRQ), Anton Kozlov (KAZ)

October 16
19:30

Report

| Mahram Tehran (Iran) | 91–52 | (Iraq) Duhok |
Scoring by quarter: 29–12, 21–19, 21–8, 20–13
| Pts: Varda, Nikkhah 18; Rebs: Nabipour 10; Asts: Nikkhah 8 | | Pts: Webb 11; Rebs: Hatem 7 Asts: Four players 2 |

Saeb Salam Arena, Beirut
Referees: Yevgeniy Mikheyev (KAZ), Rabee Al-Masri (LIB), Arsen Andryushkin (KAZ)

October 17
17:00

Report

| Al-Riyadi Beirut (Lebanon) | 96–51 | (Iraq) Duhok |
Scoring by quarter: 24–4, 29–13, 25–16, 18–18
| Pts: Ibrahim 33; Rebs: Abdelnour 10; Asts: Mahmoud, Ahmed 5 | | Pts: Webb 17; Rebs: Dartez 9 Asts: Webb 3 |

Saeb Salam Arena, Beirut
Referees: Arsen Andryushkin (KAZ), Heros Avanesian (IRI), Yevgeniy Mikheyev (KAZ)

October 17
19:30

Report

| Energy Resources Falcons (Mongolia) | 68–96 | (Turkmenistan) Belent Ashgabat |
Scoring by quarter: 22–21, 11–29, 13–20, 22–26
| Pts: Nemekhbayar 18; Rebs: Zolzaya 7 Asts: Tsolmonkhüü 6 | | Pts: Awerýanow, Juginisov 18; Rebs: Awerýanow 18; Asts: Allanurow 6 |

Saeb Salam Arena, Beirut
Referees: Marwan Egho (LIB), Ahmed Al-Suwaili (IRQ), Amir Hossein Safarzadeh (IRI)

October 18
17:00

Report

| Belent Ashgabat (Turkmenistan) | 71–118 | (Iran) Mahram Tehran |
Scoring by quarter: 16–26, 11–29, 24–30, 20–33
| Pts: Kozlov 19; Rebs: Awerýanow 4 Asts: Baýryýew 4 | | Pts: Sedighi 20; Rebs: Kardoust 8 Asts: Aslani, Davarpanah 5 |

Saeb Salam Arena, Beirut
Referees: Rabee Al-Masri (LIB), Anton Kozlov (KAZ), Ahmed Al-Suwaili (IRQ)

October 18
19:30

Report

| Duhok (Iraq) | 99–62 | (Mongolia) Energy Resources Falcons |
Scoring by quarter: 19–17, 23–13, 33–16, 24–16
| Pts: Gorgiss 33; Rebs: Dartez 8 Asts: Amer 7 | | Pts: Mönkhtüvshin 15; Rebs: Bolortulga 7 Asts: Tsolmonkhüü, Bat-Erdene 2 |

Saeb Salam Arena, Beirut
Referees: Marwan Egho (LIB), Amir Hossein Safarzadeh (IRI), Arsen Andryushkin (KAZ)

October 19
17:00

Report

| Mahram Tehran (Iran) | 63–88 | (Lebanon) Al-Riyadi Beirut |
Scoring by quarter: 6–17, 15–20, 26–28, 16–23
| Pts: Kamrani 21; Rebs: Nabipour 8 Asts: Aslani 4 | | Pts: Ibrahim 29; Rebs: Woods 16; Asts: Ahmed 5 |

Saeb Salam Arena, Beirut
Referees: Arsen Andryushkin (KAZ), Yevgeniy Mikheyev (KAZ), Anton Kozlov (KAZ)

October 19
19:30

Report

| Belent Ashgabat (Turkmenistan) | 77–88 | (Iraq) Duhok |
Scoring by quarter: 23–17, 16–19, 12–23, 26–29
| Pts: Kozlov 23; Rebs: Juginisov 10; Asts: Baýryýew 5 | | Pts: Webb 27; Rebs: Dartez 13; Asts: Webb 5 |

Saeb Salam Arena, Beirut
Referees: Heros Avanesian (IRI), Amir Hossein Safarzadeh (IRI), Rabee Al-Masri (LIB)

== Final round ==
Semifinals
October 20
(Lebanon) Al-Riyadi | 116
(Turkmenistan) Belent | 65
October 20
(Iran) Mahram | 93
(Iraq) Duhok | 76

Final
October 22
(Lebanon) Al-Riyadi
(Iran) Mahram
3rd place
October 21
(Turkmenistan) Belent | 58
(Iraq) Duhok | 73

=== Semifinals ===
October 20
18:00

Report

| Al-Riyadi Beirut (Lebanon) | 116–65 | (Turkmenistan) Belent Ashgabat |
Scoring by quarter: 32–8, 29–19, 30–11, 25–27
| Pts: Saoud 45; Rebs: Saoud 6 Asts: El Turk, Arakji 7 | | Pts: Kozlov 16; Rebs: Atahanow 9 Asts: Akmämmedow 2 |

Saeb Salam Arena, Beirut
Referees: Anton Kozlov (KAZ), Amir Hossein Safarzadeh (IRI), Ahmed Al-Suwaili (IRQ)

October 20
20:30

Report

| Mahram Tehran (Iran) | 93–76 | (Iraq) Duhok |
Scoring by quarter: 18–19, 27–19, 24–19, 24–19
| Pts: Kamrani 23; Rebs: Varda 9 Asts: Kamrani 9 | | Pts: Dartez 17; Rebs: Hatem 8 Asts: Muayad 2 |

Saeb Salam Arena, Beirut
Referees: Marwan Egho (LIB), Yevgeniy Mikheyev (KAZ), Rabee Al-Masri (LIB)

=== 3rd place ===
October 21
10:30

Report

| Belent Ashgabat (Turkmenistan) | 58–73 | (Iraq) Duhok |
Scoring by quarter: 17–20, 14–19, 10–13, 17–21
| Pts: Kozlov 18; Rebs: Juginisov 9 Asts: Baýryýew, Mazurow 2 | | Pts: Gorgiss 26; Rebs: Hatem 11; Asts: Muayad, Dartez 3 |

Saeb Salam Arena, Beirut
Referees: Marwan Egho (LIB), Heros Avanesian (IRI), Anton Kozlov (KAZ)

=== Final ===
| Al-Riyadi Beirut (Lebanon) | vs. | (Iran) Mahram Tehran |
Called off because of security issues in Beirut

- Championship was called off after Assassination of Wissam al-Hassan. No title awarded, but FIBA Asia website later announced both teams tied on 1st and 2nd places.

== Final standing ==
| Rank | Team | Record |
|---|---|---|
| 2nd place, silver medalist(s) | (Lebanon) Al-Riyadi Beirut | 5–0 |
| 2nd place, silver medalist(s) | (Iran) Mahram Tehran | 4–1 |
| 3rd place, bronze medalist(s) | (Iraq) Duhok | 3–3 |
| 4 | (Turkmenistan) Belent Ashgabat | 1–5 |
| 5 | (Mongolia) Energy R. Falcons | 0–4 |
