= Paul Robeson High School for Business and Technology =

Public school in New York City

Coordinates: 40°40′32″N 73°56′20″W

Paul Robeson High School for Business and Technology was a high school in the Crown Heights section of Brooklyn, New York City, New York. It was part of the New York City Department of Education. The school was named for Paul Robeson, a singer and civil rights activist. Its building was previously known as Alexander Hamilton Technical and Vocational High School, which closed in February 1984. The school reopened in the fall of 1985 under the Robeson name.

The building was designed by Charles Snyder in the Beaux-Arts style and originally opened in 1905 as Commercial High School and housed three murals by the artist Abraham Bogdanove: Commerce, Ancient and Modern (1918) on either side of the proscenium arch of the Auditorium (removed in 1999, restored and relocated to Tottenville High School in Staten Island) and Education (1924) in the front lobby currently draped over by a mural of Paul Robeson.

The school was closed in 2011 due to failing ratings and has been reopened as Pathways to Technology High School. The controversial closure of the school in 2011 was the inspiration for a series of student protests culminating in a walkout on May 1, 2012. This led to the creation of the Paul Robeson Freedom School, co-founded by graduates of the school along with education advocates Justin Wedes and Rodney Deas.

== Notable alumni ==
- Jameel Watkins (1996), basketball player who played overseas
- Kenny Adeleke (2001), basketball player who played overseas
- Malcolm Grant (2006), basketball player who played overseas
- Brandon Penn (2008), basketball player who played overseas
