= Jameel Watkins =

American basketball player (born 1977)

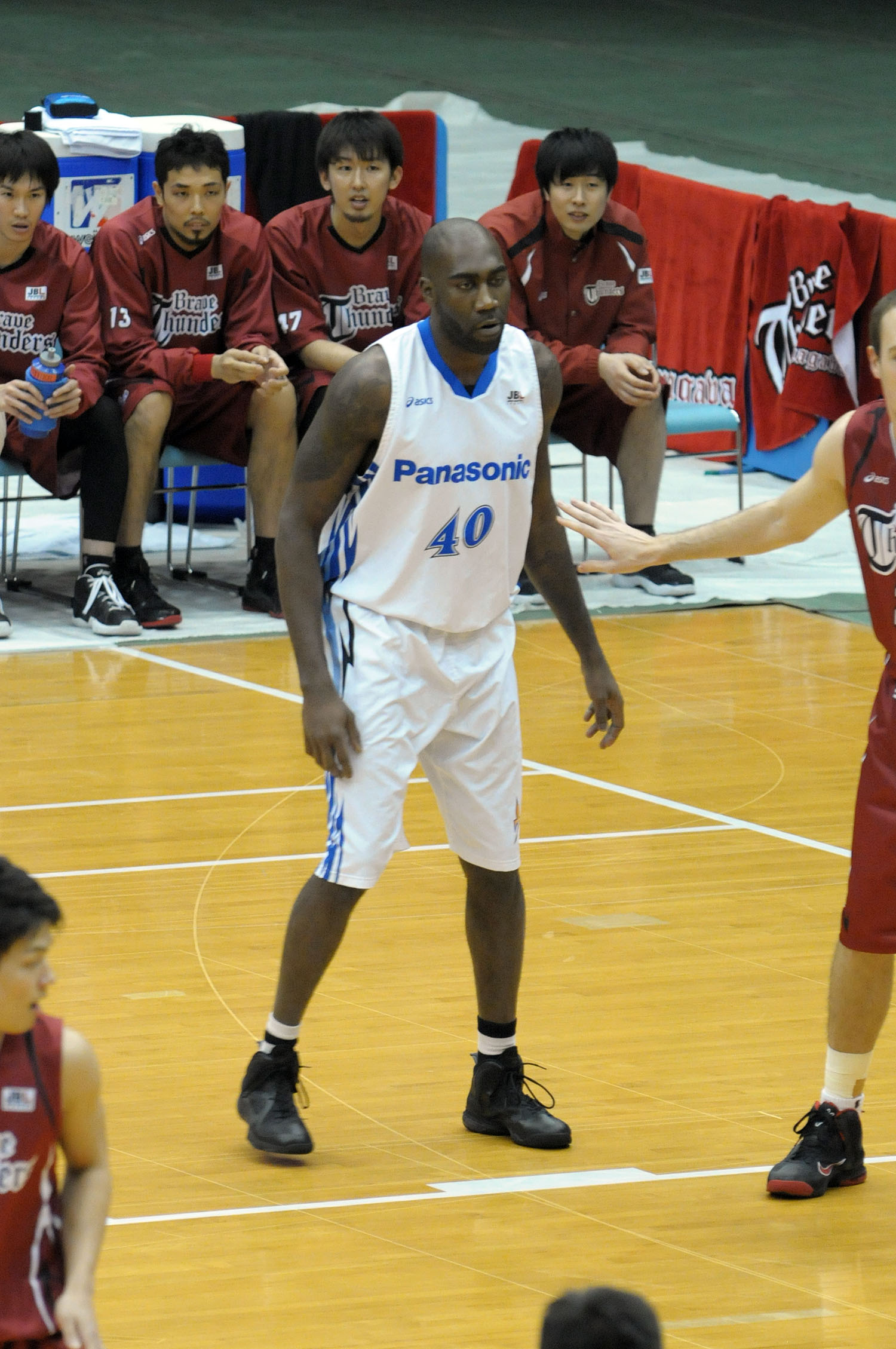
- Watkins with the Panasonic Trians in 2013

Personal information
- Born: August 2, 1977 (age 49) Brooklyn, New York, U.S.
- Listed height: 6 ft 10 in (2.08 m)
- Listed weight: 255 lb (116 kg)

Career information
- High school: Paul Robeson (Brooklyn, New York)
- College: Georgetown (1996–2000)
- NBA draft: 2000: undrafted
- Playing career: 2000–present
- Position: Center / power forward

Career history
- 2000–2001: Fort Wayne Fury
- 2001: Los Angeles Stars
- 2001: Cáceres CB
- 2001–2002: Basket Livorno
- 2002: Fayetteville Patriots
- 2002: Maratonistas de Coamo
- 2002–2003: Fayetteville Patriots
- 2003: Shanxi Yujin
- 2004: Beijing Ducks
- 2004: Shell Turbo Chargers
- 2004: Xinjiang Flying Tigers
- 2004–2007: Wonju
- 2005: Kuwait SC
- 2006: Kansas Cagerz
- 2007–2008: Fujian XunXin
- 2008: Magnolia Beverage Masters
- 2008–2009: Jiangsu Dragons
- 2009: Cangrejeros de Santurce
- 2009–2010: Jiangsu Dragons
- 2010: Cangrejeros de Cartagena
- 2010: Sageese
- 2010–2011: Jilin Northeast Tigers
- 2011: ASU Sports Club
- 2011: Leones de Santo Domingo
- 2011–2012: Jilin Northeast Tigers
- 2012: KCC Egis
- 2012: Marinos de Anzoátegui
- 2012–2013: Panasonic Trians
- 2013–2014: Levanga Hokkaido
- 2014–2015: Al Mouttahed Tripoli
- 2016: Wellington Saints

Career highlights
- LPB champion (2012); Jordanian League (2011); KBL champion (2005); Japanese NBL All-Star (2014); JBL All-Star (2013)

Jameel Sharif Watkins (born August 2, 1977) is an American professional basketball player who last played for the Wellington Saints of the New Zealand National Basketball League (NBL). He played college basketball for the Georgetown Hoyas during the late 1990s, earning a reputation for his defensive proficiency and shot-blocking skills. His professional career has taken him all around the world, playing with over 20 different teams. In addition, between 2000 and 2007, Watkins had four NBA training camp/preseason stints but never played in a regular-season game for any of them.

== High school and college career ==
Born in Brooklyn, New York, Watkins led Paul Robeson High School to an NYC championship and was earned honorable mention All-America honors by USA Today.

After redshirting the 1995–96 season, Watkins played in all but three games for Georgetown as a freshman in 1996–97, averaging 2.6 points and 2.7 rebounds in nine minutes per game.

As a sophomore in 1997–98, Watkins stepped up when fellow big men Jahidi White and Ruben Boumtje-Boumtje were sidelined with injuries, recording a 16-rebound game against West Virginia. In 31 games, he averaged 4.5 points and 4.9 rebounds per game.

As a junior in 1998–99, Watkins started all 31 games and was the fifth-leading scorer on the team with a career-high 7.8 points per game. He also averaged a career-high 7.2 rebounds.

As a senior in 1999–2000, Watkins played in every game, averaging 12.3 minutes per game. He was the third-leading shot-blocker on team with 1.1 per game. He also averaged 4.1 points and 3.3 rebounds per game. He made a strong impression at the Portsmouth Invitational Tournament following his senior season at Georgetown, averaging 12.3 points and 9.0 rebounds to help his team win the championship. Had 16 points and 11 rebounds in the championship game and was named to the PIT All-Tournament team.

== Professional career ==
=== Early years (2000–2007) ===
In his first professional season, the 2000–01 campaign, Watkins played in both the Continental Basketball Association and the American Basketball Association for the Fort Wayne Fury and the Los Angeles Stars. In April 2001, he signed a short-term deal with Spanish club Cáceres CB to replace the injured Tim Perry.

Watkins spent the first half of the 2001–02 season in Italy with Basket Livorno. He left the club in January 2002 and finished the season with the Fayetteville Patriots of the NBA Development League. Following the 2001–02 D-League season, Watkins had a five-game stint in Puerto Rico for Maratonistas de Coamo.

For the 2002–03 season, Watkins returned to the Fayetteville Patriots. He later had a stint with Chinese team Shanshi YuJing in mid-2003.

In January 2004, Watkins signed with the Beijing Ducks for the rest of the 2003–04 CBA season. In April of that year, he moved to the Philippines where he played for the Shell Turbo Chargers during the 2004 PBA Fiesta Conference. In 10 games for the Chargers, he averaged 27.3 points, 18.0 rebounds, 3.9 assists, 1.1 steals and 2.8 blocks per game.

Between 2004 and 2007, Watkins played in the Korean Basketball League for Wonju Dongbu Promy. During this time, he also had off-season stints with Kuwait SC (2005) and Kansas Cagerz (2006).

=== Later years (2007–present) ===
During the 2007–08 season, Watkins played in China for Fujian XunXin and in the Philippines for the Magnolia Beverage Masters. Between 2008 and 2010, he played for the Jiangsu Dragons, while he also had a mid-2009 stint in Puerto Rico for Cangrejeros de Santurce.

Between 2010 and 2011, Watkins played in Colombia, Lebanon, China, Jordan, and the Dominican Republic. This was followed by more time in Asia between 2011 and 2015, playing in China, Korea and Japan, while also having stints in Venezuela and Lebanon.

On March 27, 2016, Watkins signed a two-week contract with the Wellington Saints. On April 7, he parted ways with the Saints. He appeared in three games for the Saints, averaging 7.7 points and 6.3 rebounds per game, and had a double-double of 16 points and 15 rebounds on March 31 against the Southland Sharks.
