= Chauncey Leslie =

American basketball player (born 1981)

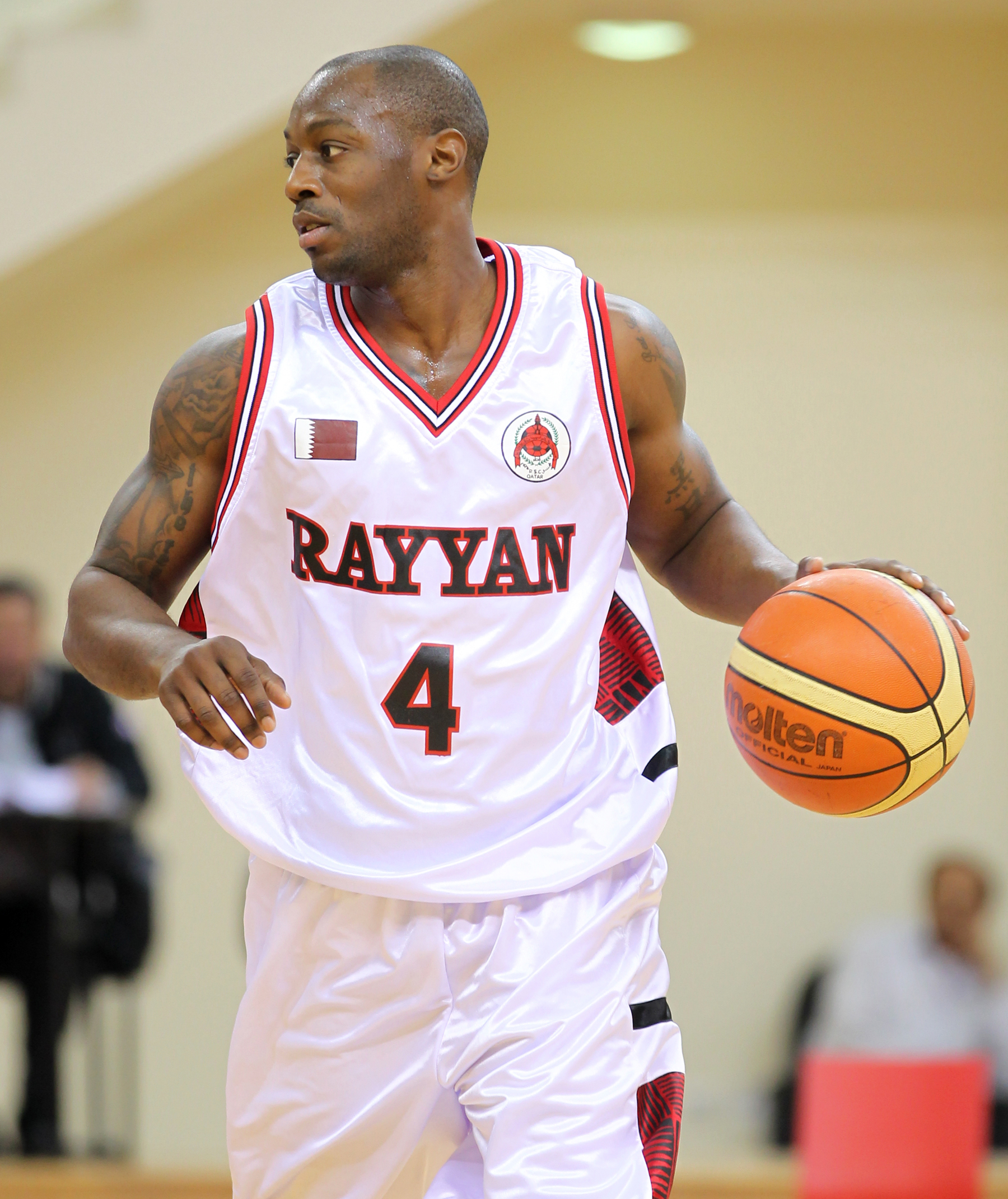
- Chauncey in 2012

Personal information
- Born: June 7, 1981 (age 45) Rochester, New York, U.S.
- Listed height: 6 ft 0 in (1.83 m)
- Listed weight: 165 lb (75 kg)
- Position: Point guard

Chauncey La Mont Leslie (born June 7, 1981) is an American professional basketball guard who plays for the Al Rayan SC Basketball Team in Qatar. Previously he played for several clubs in Germany, France and Hungary.
