= Sam Daghles =

Jordanian professional basketball player

Rio Grande Valley Vipers
- Title: Assistant coach
- League: NBA G League

Personal information
- Born: September 18, 1979 (age 47)
- Listed height: 6 ft 6 in (1.98 m)
- Listed weight: 200 lb (91 kg)

Career information
- High school: Madison (San Diego, California)
- College: San Diego Mesa (1999–2001); Midwestern State (2001–2002)
- NBA draft: 2002: undrafted
- Playing career: 2003–2015
- Position: Point guard / shooting guard
- Coaching career: 2016–present

Career history

Playing
- 2003–2011: Fastlink / Zain
- 2006–2007: Xinjiang Flying Tigers
- 2011: Shanxi Brave Dragons
- 2011–2012: Jilin Northeast Tigers
- 2012: ASU Sports Club
- 2012–2013: Tianjin Gold Lions
- 2013–2014: Jilin Northeast Tigers
- 2015: Talk 'N Text Tropang Texters

Coaching
- 2016–2018: Jordan national team
- 2019–present: Rio Grande Valley Vipers (assistant)

Career highlights
- As Player: FIBA Asia Champions Cup champion (2006); 7× Jordanian Basketball League champion (2003–2009, 2011); As Assistant Coach: NBA G League champion (2022)
Medals
Men's basketball
Representing Jordan
FIBA Asia Championship
Bronze medal – third place	2009 Tianjin	Team
Silver medal – second place	2011 Wuhan	Team
William Jones Cup
Silver medal – second place	2009 Taipei	Team

Osama Mohd Fathi Daghles, commonly known by the nickname Sam Daghles (born September 18, 1979), is a Jordanian professional basketball player of Palestinian origin. He currently works as CEO of the SD13 sports academy in Amman, Jordan. Born in Taiyuan, Shanxi, he lived in San Diego, California, where he played for James Madison High School.

In 2006, he was selected 4th in the 8th round by the Idaho Stampede of the NBA D-League.

== Early career ==
Daghles started playing basketball at age 14 during visits to local playgrounds. He made the James Madison High School varsity in his first year.

Daghles met an automobile accident in his early college years. This was before he got involved with a travelling team called High Five America. He won an MVP award at San Diego Mesa College for his two years in junior college.

Daghles would then receive a scholarship to attend Midwestern State University in his junior year. As a junior in the 2001–2002 season, he averaged 10.1 points, 4.4 rebounds, and 4.5 assists while starting 24 of 26 games.

== Pro career ==
Daghles started his professional career in 2003 by joining the Fastlink Sports Club team in the Jordanian Basketball League. He would lead Fastlink in securing the 2007 league championship. In addition, Daghles is a two-time MVP of the Jordanian Basketball League for the 2003–04 and 2005–06 seasons. He also was voted best playmaker in the 2006 FIBA Asia Champions Cup for leading his Fastlink team to first place.

In 2006, he was selected 4th in the 8th round by the Idaho Stampede of the NBA D-League.

Daghles is a member of the Jordan national basketball team since 2003.

Daghles signed with the Talk 'N Text Tropang Texters of the Philippine Basketball Association (PBA) as their Asian import during the 2015 PBA Governors' Cup.
