= Ali Fakhreddine =

Lebanese basketball player (born 1983)

Free agent
- Position: Forward
- League: Lebanese Basketball League

Personal information
- Born: April 3, 1983 (age 43) Lebanon
- Listed height: 6 ft 8 in (2.03 m)
- Listed weight: 210 lb (95 kg)
Medals
Men's basketball
Representing Lebanon
FIBA Asia Championship
Silver medal – second place	2007 Tokushima	Team

Ali Fakhreddine (born in Lebanon on April 3, 1983) is a retired professional Lebanese basketball player who most recently played for the team Sagesse Club. He was also a member of the Lebanon national basketball team as a Forward-Center. He is 2.02 m tall (6 ft 8 in).
