= Duhok SC (basketball) =

Duhok Basketball club
- Nickname: Mountains' Hawks (صقور الجبال)
- Leagues: Iraqi Basketball League
- Founded: 1972
- Arena: Duhok Basketball Arena
- Capacity: 5000
- Location: Duhok, Iraq
- Team colors: Blue, Yellow, White
Home	Away

Duhok Basketball Club is the professional basketball team of Duhok SC based in Duhok, Iraqi Kurdistan. The club competes in the Iraqi Basketball Premier League. Duhok Basketball Club was founded in 1972.

== Honours ==
2012 FIBA Asia Champions Cup
3rd
2013 FIBA Asia Champions Cup
5th
2009 Iraqi Basketball Premier League
1st
2010 Iraqi Basketball Premier League
1st
2011 Iraqi Basketball Premier League
1st
2011 Iraqi Basketball Perseverance Cup
1st
2012 Iraqi Basketball Premier League
1st
2014 Iraqi Basketball Premier League
1st
