= Applied Science University (basketball team) =

- Leagues: Jordanian Premier Basketball League
- Founded: ASU; 2008–2015
- Location: Amman, Jordan
- Championships: 4 Jordanian Championships

Applied Science University was a Jordanian professional basketball club based in Amman, Jordan. The team competed in the Jordanian Premier Basketball League for 7 seasons from 2008 until 2015. In 2009, they finished 2–4 to earn third place in the federation. The team was disbanded in 2015. The team won four Jordanian Championships.

== Honours ==
Jordanian Premier Basketball League

- Champions (4): 2011, 2013, 2014

Jordanian Cup

- Winners (2): 2011, 2015

FIBA Asia Champions Cup

- Third place (2): 2010, 2013

== Notable players ==
- (Jordan) Zaid Abbaas
- (Jordan) Fadel Al-Najjar
- (Jordan) Islam Abbaas
- (Jordan) Ahmad Al-Dwairi
- (United States) Quincy Douby
- (United States) Vincent Grier
- (United States) Rashaad Singleton
