= List of 2021–22 P. League+ season transactions =

This is a list of transactions that took place during the 2021 P. League+ off-season and the 2021–22 P. League+ season.

== Retirement ==
Date	Name	Team(s) played (years)	Age	Notes	Ref.
April 4	Tien Lei	Formosa Taishin Dreamers (2020–2021)	37	PLG Media Darling (2021); Also played overseas. Hired as director of player development by the Formosa Taishin Dreamers.	
July 8	LaDontae Henton	Hsinchu JKO Lioneers (2020–2021)	29	Also played overseas. Hired as special assistant to the head coach by the Providence Friars.	
September 23	Lai Kuo-Wei	Taoyuan Pilots (2020–2021)	31	Also played overseas. Hired as assistant coach by the New Taipei CTBC DEA.	

== Front office movements ==
=== Head coaching changes ===
Off-season

Departure date	Team	Outgoing head coach	Reason for departure	Hire date	Incoming head coach	Last coaching position	Ref.
—N/a	New Taipei Kings	—N/a	—N/a	June 7	Ryan Marchand	Nha Trang Dolphins head coach (2020–2021)	
—N/a	Kaohsiung Steelers	—N/a	—N/a	June 11	DeMarcus Berry	Tampa Bay Titans head coach (2021)	
September 28	Taoyuan Pilots	Yang I-Feng (interim)	Assigned to assistant coach and player development director	July 12	Cheng Chih-Lung	Shanghai Sharks assistant coach (2018–2020)	

In-Season

Departure date	Team	Outgoing head coach	Reason for departure	Hire date	Incoming head coach	Last coaching position	Ref.
March 19	Kaohsiung Steelers	DeMarcus Berry	Fired	March 19	Hung Chi-Chao (interim)	Kaohsiung Steelers assistant coach (2021–2022)	
March 23	Taoyuan Pilots	Cheng Chih-Lung	Resigned	March 25	Yen Hsing-Su (interim)	Taoyuan Pilots assistant coach (2021–2022)	
April 30	Kaohsiung Steelers	Hung Chi-Chao (interim)	Interim	April 30	Slavoljub Gorunovic (interim)	US Monastir head coach (2021)	

=== General manager changes ===
Off-season

Departure date	Team	Outgoing general manager	Reason for departure	Hire date	Incoming general manager	Last managerial position	Ref.
—N/a	New Taipei Kings	—N/a	—N/a	May 24	James Mao	Kaohsiung Truth representative (2016–2017)	
—N/a	Kaohsiung Steelers	—N/a	—N/a	May 25	Cheng Ming-Yuan		
October 18	Kaohsiung Steelers	Cheng Ming-Yuan	Assigned to consultant of development	October 18	Chang Chih-Yen		

== Player movements ==
=== Trades ===
October
October 21, 2021	To Kaohsiung Steelers: Peng Chun-Yen	To Taoyuan Pilots: 2023 Steelers first-round pick
October 27, 2021	To Kaohsiung Steelers: Wang Lu-Hsiang	To Taipei Fubon Braves: 2022 Steelers first-round pick

=== Free agents ===
Player	Date signed	New team	Former team	Ref
Lin Li-Jen	June 10	New Taipei Kings	Hsinchu JKO Lioneers (waived on June 3)	
Kuo Shao-Chieh	June 15	Hsinchu JKO Lioneers	Taipei Fubon Braves	
Chien You-Che	June 19	New Taipei Kings	Taiwan Beer (Super Basketball League)	
Branden Dawson	June 19	Hsinchu JKO Lioneers		
Mike Singletary	June 23	Taipei Fubon Braves		
Lee Ying-Feng	June 25	New Taipei Kings	Kaohsiung Jeoutai Technology (Super Basketball League)	
Anthony Tucker	June 25	Kaohsiung Steelers	Formosa Taishin Dreamers	
Wang Po-Chih	June 28	Kaohsiung Steelers	Formosa Taishin Dreamers	
Huang Hung-Han	June 30	Taoyuan Pilots	Taiwan Beer (Super Basketball League)	
Chang Po-Wei	July 1	Kaohsiung Steelers	Taipei Fubon Braves	
Lee Kai-Yan	July 1	New Taipei Kings	Yulon Luxgen Dinos (Super Basketball League)	
Chang Keng-Yu	July 1	Taipei Fubon Braves	Taoyuan Pilots	
Lin Yi-Huei	July 3	Hsinchu JKO Lioneers	Yulon Luxgen Dinos (Super Basketball League)	
Shih Chin-Yao	July 5	Taoyuan Pilots		
Chen Yu-Jui	July 9	Taoyuan Pilots	Bank of Taiwan (Super Basketball League)	
Douglas Creighton	July 9	Formosa Taishin Dreamers	Yulon Luxgen Dinos (Super Basketball League)	
Lu Cheng-Ju	July 13	Kaohsiung Steelers	Yulon Luxgen Dinos (Super Basketball League)	
Chen Kuan-Chuan	July 14	Taoyuan Pilots		
Lin Yao-Tsung	July 14	Taoyuan Pilots		
K. J. McDaniels	July 14	Formosa Taishin Dreamers	Greensboro Swarm (NBA G League)	
Jordan Tolbert	July 21	Taoyuan Pilots	Yulon Luxgen Dinos (Super Basketball League)	
Wu Yung-Sheng	August 2	Formosa Taishin Dreamers	Xinjiang Flying Tigers (Chinese Basketball Association)	
Yang Hsing-Chih	August 13	New Taipei Kings	Taipei Fubon Braves (ASEAN Basketball League)	
Chieng Li-Huan	August 17	Formosa Taishin Dreamers	Hsinchu JKO Lioneers (waived on June 29)	
Li Chia-Kang	August 25	Taoyuan Pilots	Taoyuan Pauian Archiland (Super Basketball League)	
Lu Chun-Hsiang	August 25	Taoyuan Pilots	Taoyuan Pauian Archiland (Super Basketball League)	
Shih Yen-Tsung	August 25	Taoyuan Pilots	Taoyuan Pauian Archiland (Super Basketball League)	
Wen Li-Huang	August 25	Taoyuan Pilots	Taoyuan Pauian Archiland (Super Basketball League)	
Wu Chia-Chun	August 25	Taoyuan Pilots	Taoyuan Pauian Archiland (Super Basketball League)	
Brandon Gilbeck	September 8	Formosa Taishin Dreamers	Fraser Valley Bandits (Canadian Elite Basketball League)	
Yang Chin-Min	September 10	New Taipei Kings	Formosa Taishin Dreamers	
Julian Boyd	September 14	Formosa Taishin Dreamers	Hapoel Jerusalem B.C. (Israeli Basketball Premier League)	
Ihor Zaytsev	September 14	Taipei Fubon Braves		
Jerran Young	September 17	New Taipei Kings	Formosa Taishin Dreamers	
Thomas Welsh	September 24	New Taipei Kings	B.C. Oostende (Pro Basketball League)	
Su Chih-Cheng	September 28	Taoyuan Pilots	NTSU (Undrafted in 2021)	
Keith Benson	October 1	Kaohsiung Steelers	BC Levski Sofia (National Basketball League)	
Samuel Deguara	October 1	Taipei Fubon Braves	Tokyo Excellence (B.League)	
Quincy Davis	October 13	New Taipei Kings	Taoyuan Pilots	
Steven Guinchard	October 15	New Taipei Kings	Cran Pringy Basket (Nationale Masculine 3)	
Lu Che-Yi	October 15	Kaohsiung Steelers	Hsinchu JKO Lioneers	
Hung Chih-Shan	October 16	New Taipei Kings	Taipei Fubon Braves (ASEAN Basketball League)	
Sim Bhullar	October 22	Hsinchu JKO Lioneers	Yulon Luxgen Dinos (Super Basketball League)	
Taylor Braun	October 26	Kaohsiung Steelers	Maccabi Haifa B.C. (Israeli Basketball Premier League)	
Nick Faust	October 28	Hsinchu JKO Lioneers	Spójnia Stargard (Polish Basketball League)	
John Gillon	November 9	Taoyuan Pilots	Alba Fehérvár (Nemzeti Bajnokság I/A)	
Devin Robinson	November 10	Taoyuan Pilots	Fort Wayne Mad Ants (NBA G League)	
Chris McCullough	November 17	New Taipei Kings	Gigantes de Carolina (Baloncesto Superior Nacional)	
Cheng Tzu-Yang	November 19	Formosa Taishin Dreamers	Yulon Luxgen Dinos (Super Basketball League)	
Ricky Ledo	November 23	Formosa Taishin Dreamers	Fethiye Belediyespor (Turkish Basketball First League)	
DeAndre Liggins	December 3	New Taipei Kings	London Lions (British Basketball League)	
Anthony Bennett	February 9	Kaohsiung Steelers	Hapoel Jerusalem B.C. (Israeli Basketball Premier League)	
Stephan Hicks	February 15	Formosa Taishin Dreamers	Fort Wayne Mad Ants (NBA G League)	
Chou Yi-Hsiang	February 16	Kaohsiung Steelers	Beijing Ducks (Chinese Basketball Association)	
Manny Harris	March 2	Kaohsiung Steelers	AEK B.C. (Greek Basket League)	
Stefan Janković	March 2	Formosa Taishin Dreamers	BC Tsmoki-Minsk (Belarusian Premier League)	
Perry Jones	March 9	Taipei Fubon Braves	Windy City Bulls (NBA G League)	
Nemanja Bešović	March 10	Taoyuan Pilots	Academic Plovdiv (National Basketball League)	
Mike Bruesewitz	March 28	Hsinchu JKO Lioneers	Vaqueros de Bayamón (Baloncesto Superior Nacional)	
Lin Chin-Pang	March 28	Taoyuan Pilots	Taoyuan Pauian Archiland (Super Basketball League)	
Byron Mullens	March 30	New Taipei Kings	London Lions (British Basketball League)	

=== Going to other Taiwanese leagues ===
Player	Date signed	New team	New league	P. League+ team	Ref
Ting Sheng-Ju	July 21	Taichung Wagor Suns	T1 League	Taoyuan Pilots	
Tsai Chien-Yu	August 4	Kaohsiung Jeoutai Technology	Super Basketball League	Hsinchu JKO Lioneers	
Sun Szu-Yao	August 14	Taichung Wagor Suns	T1 League	Taoyuan Pilots	
Chen Ching-Huan	September 3	Taichung Wagor Suns	T1 League	Taoyuan Pilots (waived on July 30)	
Cheng Wei	October 13	Taoyuan Leopards	T1 League	Hsinchu JKO Lioneers	
Charles Garcia	October 22	Tainan TSG GhostHawks	T1 League	Taipei Fubon Braves	
Hasheem Thabeet	October 28	Tainan TSG GhostHawks	T1 League	Hsinchu JKO Lioneers	
Jonah Morrison	November 2	New Taipei CTBC DEA	T1 League	Formosa Taishin Dreamers	
Oscar Lin	November 15	Tainan TSG GhostHawks	T1 League	Taipei Fubon Braves	
Jordan Chatman	November 29	Tainan TSG GhostHawks	T1 League	Taoyuan Pilots	
Chen Shih-Chieh	November 30	Taoyuan Pauian Archiland	Super Basketball League	Taoyuan Pilots	
Julian Wright	December 21	Taichung Wagor Suns	T1 League	Hsinchu JKO Lioneers (waived on February 14, 2020)	
John Gillon	January 7	Taoyuan Leopards	T1 League	Taoyuan Pilots	
Anthony Tucker	February 10	Taichung Wagor Suns	T1 League	Kaohsiung Steelers (waived on February 8)	
Lai Kuo-Wei	March 4	New Taipei CTBC DEA	T1 League	Taoyuan Pilots	
Samuel Deguara	March 21	TaiwanBeer HeroBears	T1 League	Taipei Fubon Braves (waived on March 21)	

=== Going overseas ===
Player	Date signed	New team	New country	Former P. League+ team	Ref
Stephan Hicks	August 3	BC Samara	Russia	Formosa Taishin Dreamers	
Kadeem Jack	August 22	Cangrejeros de Santurce	Puerto Rico	Taoyuan Pilots	
Davon Reed	September 27	Denver Nuggets	United States	Taoyuan Pilots	
Willie Warren	October 25	Al Shamal	Qatar	Taoyuan Pilots (waived on January 29, 2021)	
K. J. McDaniels	November 2	NLEX Road Warriors	Philippines	Formosa Taishin Dreamers (waived on September 22)	
Ricky Ledo	January 21	Guangdong Southern Tigers	China	Formosa Taishin Dreamers (waived on December 23)	

=== Waived ===
Player	Date	Former team	Ref
Lin Li-Jen	June 3	Hsinchu JKO Lioneers	
Chieng Li-Huan	June 29	Hsinchu JKO Lioneers	
Chen Ching-Huan	July 30	Taoyuan Pilots	
K. J. McDaniels	September 22	Formosa Taishin Dreamers	
Ricky Ledo	December 23	Formosa Taishin Dreamers	
Anthony Tucker	February 8	Kaohsiung Steelers	
Branden Dawson	March 1	Hsinchu JKO Lioneers	
Chris McCullough	March 18	New Taipei Kings	
Samuel Deguara	March 21	Taipei Fubon Braves	
Stephan Hicks	March 28	Formosa Taishin Dreamers	

== Draft ==
Pick	Player	Date signed	Team	Ref
1	Chu Yun-Hao	July 23	Hsinchu JKO Lioneers	
2	Chen Yu-Wei	August 11	Kaohsiung Steelers	
3	Hung Kai-Chieh	August 20	New Taipei Kings	
4	Chen Chun-Nan	August 31	New Taipei Kings	
5	Lin Jyun-Hao	August 16	Kaohsiung Steelers	
6	Wang Lu-Hsiang	August 12	Taipei Fubon Braves	
7	Omar Niang	August 31	New Taipei Kings	
8	Lan Shao-Fu	August 23	Kaohsiung Steelers	
9	Liu Chun-Ting	—	Kaohsiung Steelers	
10	Tseng Yu-Hao	August 31	New Taipei Kings	
11	Wang Wei-Cheng	—	Formosa Taishin Dreamers	
12	Lin Shih-Hsuan	August 31	New Taipei Kings	
13	Cheng Te-Wei	August 18	Kaohsiung Steelers	
14	Wang Chen-Yuan	July 29	Formosa Taishin Dreamers	
15	Matthew Yang	August 25	Kaohsiung Steelers	
16	Austin Derrick	September 16	Kaohsiung Steelers	
