= List of 2020–21 P. League+ season transactions =

This is a list of transactions that took place during the 2020 P. League+ off-season and the 2020–21 P. League+ season.

== Retirement ==
Date	Name	Team(s) played (years)	Age	Notes	Ref.
February 19	Chi Sung-Yu	Formosa Taishin Dreamers (2020–2021)	25		

== Front office movements ==
=== Head coaching changes ===
Off-season

Departure date	Team	Outgoing head coach	Reason for departure	Hire date	Incoming head coach	Last coaching position	Ref.
—N/a	Hsinchu JKO Lioneers	—N/a	—N/a	August 3	Lin Kuan-Lun	Qiang Shu HS coach (2019–2020); Keelung Municipal Anle Senior HS coach (2019–2020); Keelung Municipal Cheng Bin Junior HS coach (2011–2020)	
—N/a	Taoyuan Pilots	—N/a	—N/a	October 13	Liu I-Hsiang	Shanxi Loongs assistant coach (2015–2020)	

In-season

Departure date	Team	Outgoing head coach	Reason for departure	Hire date	Incoming head coach	Last coaching position	Ref.
December 22	Taoyuan Pilots	Liu I-Hsiang	Mutually agreed to part ways	December 22	Yang I-Feng (interim)	Taoyuan Pilots assistant coach (2020–2021)	

=== General manager changes ===
Off-season

Departure date	Team	Outgoing general manager	Reason for departure	Hire date	Incoming general manager	Last managerial position	Ref.
—N/a	Hsinchu JKO Lioneers	—N/a	—N/a	August 8	Kenny Kao		
—N/a	Taoyuan Pilots	—N/a	—N/a	October 15	Chen Hsin-An		
November 18	Formosa Taishin Dreamers	Chang Hsien-Ming		November 18	Han Chun-Kai	Formosa Dreamers vice representative (2017–2020)	

== Player movements ==
=== Free agents ===
Player	Date signed	New team	Former team	Ref
Chou Kuei-Yu	May 26	Taipei Fubon Braves	NTNU	
Tseng Hsiang-Chun	May 26	Taipei Fubon Braves	FJU	
Lin Chun-Chi	May 27	Formosa Taishin Dreamers	UCH	
Tsai Wen-Cheng	June 16	Taipei Fubon Braves		
Chien Wei-Ju	July 3	Taipei Fubon Braves	Taoyuan Pauian Archiland (Super Basketball League)	
Lee Te-Wei	July 23	Formosa Taishin Dreamers	Yulon Luxgen Dinos (Super Basketball League)	
Lin Meng-Hsueh	July 29	Taipei Fubon Braves		
Jonah Morrison	July 30	Formosa Taishin Dreamers	UBC	
Tien Lei	August 13	Formosa Taishin Dreamers		
Yang Chin-Min	August 13	Formosa Taishin Dreamers		
Cheng Wei	September 1	Hsinchu JKO Lioneers	Formosa Dreamers (ASEAN Basketball League)	
Chieng Li-Huan	September 1	Hsinchu JKO Lioneers	Taiwan Beer (Super Basketball League)	
Hsiao Shun-Yi	September 1	Hsinchu JKO Lioneers	Taipei Fubon Braves (ASEAN Basketball League)	
Iong Ngai-San	September 1	Hsinchu JKO Lioneers	NTNU	
Lee Chia-Jui	September 1	Hsinchu JKO Lioneers	Jeoutai Technology (Super Basketball League)	
Lin Li-Jen	September 1	Hsinchu JKO Lioneers	Yulon Luxgen Dinos (Super Basketball League)	
Pan Kuan-Han	September 1	Hsinchu JKO Lioneers	Yulon Luxgen Dinos (Super Basketball League)	
Lu Che-Yi	September 1	Hsinchu JKO Lioneers	ISU	
Sung Yu-Hsuan	September 1	Hsinchu JKO Lioneers	Henan Golden Elephants (National Basketball League)	
Elliot Tan	September 1	Hsinchu JKO Lioneers	Taoyuan Pauian Archiland (Super Basketball League)	
Wu Tai-Hao	September 1	Hsinchu JKO Lioneers	Taoyuan Pauian Archiland (Super Basketball League)	
Tien Hao	September 1	Hsinchu JKO Lioneers	NCCU	
Tsai Chien-Yu	September 1	Hsinchu JKO Lioneers	CKIMH	
Kao Kuo-Hao	September 7	Hsinchu JKO Lioneers	Southeast Missouri State	
Joseph Lin	September 11	Taipei Fubon Braves		
Jerran Young	September 15	Formosa Taishin Dreamers		
Hasheem Thabeet	September 26	Hsinchu JKO Lioneers	Fort Wayne Mad Ants (NBA G League)	
Brendon Smart	September 28	Taipei Fubon Braves	UCH	
Yang Shen-Yen	October 5	Formosa Taishin Dreamers	Xinjiang Flying Tigers (Chinese Basketball Association)	
Anthony Tucker	October 6	Formosa Taishin Dreamers		
Sun Szu-Yao	October 15	Taoyuan Pilots	NYIT	
Chen Jen-Jei	October 16	Formosa Taishin Dreamers	Grand View	
Quincy Davis	October 20	Taoyuan Pilots	Taoyuan Pauian Archiland (Super Basketball League)	
Chang Tsung-Hsien	October 27	Taipei Fubon Braves	Formosa Dreamers (ASEAN Basketball League)	
Lin Cheng	November 1	Taoyuan Pilots	NTSU	
Charles García	November 3	Taipei Fubon Braves	Taoyuan Pauian Archiland (Super Basketball League)	
Mike Singletary	November 3	Taipei Fubon Braves	Mono Vampire (ASEAN Basketball League)	
Ihor Zaytsev	November 3	Taipei Fubon Braves	Taiwan Beer (Super Basketball League)	
Chang Keng-Yu	November 11	Taoyuan Pilots	Formosa Dreamers (waived on November 5)	
Chen Ching-Huan	November 11	Taoyuan Pilots	Kaohsiung Jeoutai Technology (Super Basketball League)	
Chen Kuan-Chuan	November 11	Taoyuan Pilots	Taoyuan Pauian Archiland (Super Basketball League)	
Chen Shih-Chien	November 11	Taoyuan Pilots	Taoyuan Pauian Archiland (Super Basketball League)	
Kuan Ta-You	November 11	Taoyuan Pilots	Taoyuan Pauian Archiland (Super Basketball League)	
Lin Yao-Tsung	November 11	Taoyuan Pilots	Taoyuan Pauian Archiland (Super Basketball League)	
Peng Chun-Yen	November 11	Taoyuan Pilots	Taoyuan Pauian Archiland (Super Basketball League)	
Shih Chin-Yao	November 11	Taoyuan Pilots	Taoyuan Pauian Archiland (Super Basketball League)	
Davon Reed	November 19	Taoyuan Pilots	Sioux Falls Skyforce (NBA G League)	
Kadeem Jack	November 19	Taoyuan Pilots	Oklahoma City Blue (NBA G League)	
Willie Warren	November 24	Taoyuan Pilots	Mineros de Zacatecas (Liga Nacional de Baloncesto Profesional)	
LaDontae Henton	November 26	Hsinchu JKO Lioneers	Maccabi Ashdod B.C. (Liga Leumit)	
Julian Wright	November 29	Hsinchu JKO Lioneers	Metropolitans 92 (LNB Pro A)	
Derek King	December 2	Formosa Taishin Dreamers	Macau Wolf Warriors (ASEAN Basketball League)	
Stephan Hicks	December 12	Formosa Taishin Dreamers	Fort Wayne Mad Ants (NBA G League)	
Kenneth Chien	December 15	Formosa Taishin Dreamers		
Lai Kuo-Wei	December 17	Taoyuan Pilots	Taiwan Beer (Super Basketball League)	
Randall Walko	January 7	Formosa Taishin Dreamers	TCNJ	
Lin Ming-Yi	January 21	Hsinchu JKO Lioneers	Hunan Jinjian Rice Industry (National Basketball League)	
Branden Dawson	February 15	Hsinchu JKO Lioneers	Kaohsiung Jeoutai Technology (Super Basketball League)	
Jordan Chatman	March 1	Taoyuan Pilots	CSU Sibiu (Liga Națională)	
Ting Sheng-Ju	March 1	Taoyuan Pilots	St. Francis	

=== Waived ===
Player	Date	Former team	Ref
Chang Keng-Yu	November 5	Formosa Taishin Dreamers	
Willie Warren	January 29	Taoyuan Pilots	
Julian Wright	February 14	Hsinchu JKO Lioneers	
Pan Kuan-Han	April 23	Hsinchu JKO Lioneers	
