= Taiwanese professional basketball match-fixing scandal =

2023 sports betting controversy

The Taiwanese professional basketball match-fixing scandal, also known as the SBL match-fixing scandal, is a Taiwanese social case that broke out in October 2023. More than ten staff members of the Yulon Luxgen Dinos of the Super Basketball League (SBL) were investigated and indicted by prosecutors and police authorities. Multiple players, including Ko Min-hao, the league's Most Valuable Player, were suspected of placing bets, collectively fixing matches, and manipulating underground gambling outcomes.

== Background ==
The 20th season of the Super Basketball League began with warm-up games in late 2022 and concluded in May 2023. Following the disbandment of Kaohsiung 9Ta Technology in May 2022, the league was left with only four teams: Bank of Taiwan, Yulon Luxgen, Taiwan Beer, and Changhua BLL (Pure Youth Construction).

Yulon Luxgen ultimately won both the regular season championship and the playoff championship. Yulon player Ko Min-hao was named Regular Season Most Valuable Player, while Bamba received the Finals Most Valuable Player award.

Taiwan's government-regulated legal sports betting platform, Taiwan Sports Lottery, had previously offered betting markets on the Super Basketball League. However, it did not open betting for the 20th SBL season, which was later implicated in the match-fixing scandal, nor did it allow betting on Taiwan's other two major professional basketball leagues, the T1 League and P. LEAGUE+. As a result, illegal underground basketball gambling markets—commonly referred to as “ball boards” (球版)—became widespread.

== Course of Events ==
=== Investigation ===
In October 2023, Taiwanese media outlet Mirror Media reported that former Yulon Luxgen player Wu Ji-ying, who transferred to Taiwan Beer after the season, had left Yulon due to involvement in underground gambling and match-fixing activities commonly known as “ball boards.” The report alleged that players’ on-court behavior in multiple games during the 20th SBL season was highly abnormal.

In November 2023, the Shilin District Prosecutors Office intervened and summoned more than ten Yulon team staff members for questioning. Players directly involved were terminated by Yulon Luxgen and permanently barred from future employment. Players from other teams who were suspected of betting participation, Chen Jing-huan and Luo Zhen-feng, were also dismissed by their respective clubs.

The Yulon case concluded its investigation on February 2, 2024, with a total of 15 individuals indicted for violating Article 21 of the Sports Lottery Issuance Act (match-fixing and gambling fraud), as well as gambling-related offenses. Among them, 10 were players, and the case was transferred to the Shilin District Court for trial.

The alleged ringleader, Yulon Luxgen player Ko Min-hao, was detained for 235 days before being released on bail on July 10, 2024.

On November 17, 2025, the Shilin District Court rendered its first-instance verdict, finding all 15 defendants guilty and sentencing them to prison terms ranging from 8 months to 7 years. Bamba was ordered to be deported after completing his sentence.

In August 2024, following expanded investigations by the Sixth Investigation Corps of the Criminal Investigation Bureau, National Police Agency, two players from Changhua BLL during the 2023 season—Shi Yan-zong and Chen Yi-lun—were found to have allegedly participated in gambling and coordinated with Yulon players to deliberately lose games. The case was separately investigated by the Changhua District Prosecutors Office.

The BLL case concluded its investigation on December 20, 2024, with both individuals indicted for violating Article 21 of the Sports Lottery Issuance Act and gambling offenses. The case was transferred to the Changhua District Court for trial.

On May 28, 2025, the court issued a first-instance verdict, sentencing Shi Yan-zong to 1 year and 7 months in prison with a 3-year suspended sentence, and Chen Yi-lun to 1 year and 6 months with a 3-year suspended sentence. No appeal was filed, and the verdict became final and binding.

=== Match-fixing methods ===
From December 27, 2022, to May 21, 2023, during the warm-up games and regular season of the 20th Super Basketball League, players including Wu Ji-ying and Ko Min-hao placed bets on at least dozens of matches through underground gambling websites, in coordination with a bookmaker surnamed Qiu, who had previously served as an assistant coach for Kaohsiung 9Ta Technology.

- The match-fixing tactics employed by participating players included:
- deliberately not executing coaching strategies during games,
- taking absurd or illogical shots,
- intentionally making bad passes,
- deliberately refusing to pass the ball,
- intentionally allowing steals,
- deliberately missing free throws,
- suddenly increasing pass frequency without tactical reason,
- choosing irrational shooting timing,
- intentionally dribbling out of bounds, and
- allowing opponents to score easily.

These actions were used to manipulate game outcomes and point differentials, creating unexpected upsets and enabling insiders to obtain substantial profits through underground gambling operations. In addition, Wu Ji-ying's girlfriend, Huang Pin-xuan, was sentenced in the first instance to 1 year in prison with a 2-year suspended sentence. A friend surnamed You received 9 months with a 2-year suspended sentence, a friend surnamed Zhang received 8 months, and a friend surnamed Qiu received 1 year with a 2-year suspended sentence.
