= List of Taipei Fubon Braves head coaches =

== Key ==
GC	Games coached
W	Wins
L	Losses
Win%	Winning percentage
#	Number of coaches

== Coaches ==
Note: Statistics are correct through the end of the 2023–24 PLG season.

#	Name	Term	GC	W	L	Win%	GC	W	L	Win%	Achievements
#	Name	Term	Regular season				Playoffs				Achievements
Tera Mars
1	Alex Tan	1994–1995	36	13	23	.361	—	—	—	—	
2	Lee Chih-Chiang	1995–1997	110	55	55	.500	6	0	6	.000	
Mars/Kaohsiung Mars
3	Chung Chih-Meng	1997–1999	72	45	27	.625	7	3	4	.429	
BCC Mars
—	Chung Chih-Meng	2003–2004	24	12	12	.500	3	1	2	.333	
Videoland Hunters
—	Chung Chih-Meng	2004–2005	30	18	12	.600	3	1	2	.333	
4	Chou Hai-Jung	2005–2006	30	13	17	.433	—	—	—	—	
5	Liu Chih-Wei	2006–2007	30	21	9	.700	8	4	4	.500	2006–07 SBL Coach of the Year
Taiwan Mobile Leopards
6	Cheng Chih-Lung	2007–2011	120	44	76	.367	—	—	—	—	
Taiwan Mobile
7	Chia Fan	2011–2013	60	31	29	.517	7	3	4	.429	
—	Cheng Chih-Lung	2013–2014	30	21	9	.700	12	5	7	.417	
Fubon Braves
8	Otis Hughley Jr.	2014–2015	30	19	11	.633	5	1	4	.200	
9	Yen Shing-Shu	2015–2017	60	30	30	.500	14	6	8	.429	
10	Hsu Chin-Che	2017–2019	66	39	27	.591	25	17	8	.680	2018–2019 SBL Coach of the Year; 1 SBL championship (2019)
Taipei Fubon Braves
—	Hsu Chin-Che	2019–present	151	89	62	.589	22	17	5	.773	2020–2021 PLG Coach of the Year; 3 PLG championships (2021, 2022, 2023)
