= Taoyuan Pauian Archiland =

- Founded: 1986
- History: List: McDonald's Basketball Team (1986–1989); Hung Kuo Basketball Team (1990–1994); Hung Kuo Elephants (1994–2000); Sina Basketball Team (2000–2001); Sina Lions (2001–2002); BenQ-Sina Lions (2002–2003); Sina Lions (2003–2005); YMY Telephone Marketing (2005–2006); Azio TV Eagles (2006–2007); Pauian Archiland (2007–2012); Taichung Pauian Archiland (2012–2015); Pauian Archiland (2015–2016); Taoyuan Pauian Archiland (2016–present)
- Location: Taoyuan, Taiwan
- Team colors: Orange, white
- President: Li Chung-Shu
- General manager: Chen Hsin-An
- Ownership: Pauian Archiland
- Championships: 8 CBA:3 (1996, 1997, 1998); SBL:5 (2012, 2013, 2014, 2015, 2018)

The Taoyuan Pauian Archiland (Chinese: 桃園璞園建築籃球隊), also translated as Taoyuan Pure-Youth Construction, was a semi-professional basketball team formerly in the Super Basketball League (SBL) of Taiwan.

== History ==
Version of the team's logo.

The franchise derived its history from the celebrated Hung Kuo Elephants (宏國象) as they created the only dynasty of the defunct Chinese Basketball Alliance in Taiwan (CBA-Taiwan) between 1996 and 1998. Under the previous ownership by Sina.com and corporate sponsorship by BenQ, the team had also competed in the Chinese Basketball Association of the People's Republic of China (CBA-PRC) in the 2001–2002 and 2002–2003 seasons as the Sina Lions (新浪獅) or BenQ-Sina Lions (明基新浪獅) before becoming a founding member of the SBL in 2003.

During the CBA-Taiwan period, the Elephants were the unmatched three-time champions. Nonetheless, they did not have a chance to defend their third championship because the league was discontinued midway through the 1998–1999 season due to financial problems. In the aftermath of the league's sudden closedown, the club had hit its own financial drought, until it was rescued by Sina.com from the brink of disbandment around 2000.

As the Sina Lions, they moved to join the other professional league abbreviated as "CBA" in mainland China. Having played from a homecourt in Suzhou, Jiangsu Province, China, the Lions made the quarter-finals in their first year with the CBA-PRC but finished 13th out of 14 teams in the league with a disappointing 7–19 record in the ensuing season, and dropped out from the top-tier Division A league (甲级A组联赛). The club then withdrew from mainland China and moved back to Taiwan to join the newly founded SBL. In the SBL's inaugural 2003–2004 season, the Lions had a second-place finish and were the runners-up in the championship series against the Yulon Dinos, their long-time rival in Taiwan.

Following the retirement – forced or voluntary – of a number of aged starters, the younger Lions ended up with an embarrassing 3–27 record in the 2004–2005 season. Between 2005 and 2007, the team was turned over between various corporate owners/sponsors including YMY Telephone Marketing (幼敏電銷), Azio TV (東風衛視), and Pauian Archiland (璞園建築). With the improvement of the young players on the team, Pauian has been able to register increasing wins and made its first post-season appearance since the Lions period in 2008.

On July 11, 2022, the team has announced that they will rent their spot in SBL to Changhua County Basketball Team for the next two seasons.

== Notable players ==
Note: Flags indicate national team eligibility at FIBA-sanctioned events. Players may hold other non-FIBA nationalities not displayed.

Criteria

To appear in this section a player must have either:

- Set a club record or won an individual award while at the club
- Played at least one official international match for their national team at any time
- Played at least one official NBA match at any time.

- Chen Hsin-An
- Chen Kuan-Chuan
- Chen Shih-Chieh
- Chen Tzu-Wei
- Cheng Chih-Lung
- Chien Chia-Hung
- Chien Wei-Ju
- Chou Chun-San
- Douglas Creighton
- Quincy Davis
- Huang Chun-Hsiung
- Hung Chih-Shan
- Orlando Johnson
- Ke Chi-Hao
- Lai Kuo-Hung
- Liu I-Hsiang
- Lu Cheng-Ju
- Lu Chi-Min
- Luo Hsing-Liang
- James Mao
- Quincy Miller
- Jawann Oldham
- Peng Chun-Yen
- Garret Siler
- Tsai Wen-Cheng
- Wu Tai-Hao

== Head coaches ==
#	Name	Term	GC	W	L	Win%	GC	W	L	Win%	Achievements
#	Name	Term	Regular season				Playoffs				Achievements
Hung Kuo Elephants
1	Lee Chung-hee	1994–1996				–				–	1 championship (1996)
2	Paul Coughter	1996–1999				–				–	1996–97, 1997–98 CBA Coach of the Year. 2 championships (1997, 1998)
BenQ-Sina Lions
3	Chiu Ta-Tsung	2001–2003	50	18	32	.360	4	1	3	.250	
Sina Lions
4	Hu Tsai-Lin	2003–2004	24	14	10	.583	6	2	4	.333	
5	Liu Chun-Chin	2004–2005	30	3	27	.100	—	—	—	—	
YMY Telephone Marketing
—	Liu Chun-Chin	2005–2006	30	3	27	.100	—	—	—	—	
Azio TV Eagles
6	Hsu Chin-Che	2006–2007	30	7	23	.233	—	—	—	—	
Pauian Archiland/Taichung Pauian Archiland/Taoyuan Pauian Archiland
—	Hsu Chin-Che	2007–2015	240	160	80	.667	60	36	24	.600	2007–08, 2010, 2010–11, 2011–12, 2012–13, 2014–15 SBL Coach of the Year. 4 championships (2012, 2013, 2014, 2015)
7	Ben Metcalf	2015–2020	158	90	68	.570	44	22	22	.500	2015–16, 2017–18 SBL Coach of the Year. 1 championship (2018)
8	Yen Hsing-Shu	2020–2021	40	14	26	.350	—	—	—	—	
9	Huang Chi-Feng	2021–2022	30	3	27	.100	—	—	—	—	

== Season-by-season record ==
Chinese Basketball Association
Season	Coach	Regular season				Postseason			
Season	Coach	Won	Lost	Win %	Finish	Won	Lost	Win %	Result
2001–02	Chiu Ta-Tsung	11	13	.458	8th	1	3	.250	Lost Quarterfinals to Bayi Rockets, 1-3
2002–03	Chiu Ta-Tsung	7	19	.269	13th	Did not qualify			
Totals		18	32	.360	-	1	3	.250	1 Playoff Appearance

Super Basketball League
Season	Coach	Regular season				Postseason			
Season	Coach	Won	Lost	Win %	Finish	Won	Lost	Win %	Result
2003–04	Hu Tsai-Lin	14	10	.583	2nd	2	4	.333	Won Semifinals vs Dacin Tigers, 2-1; Lost Finals to Yulon Dinos, 0-3
2004–05	Liu Chun-Chin	3	27	.100	7th	Did not qualify			
2005–06	Liu Chun-Chin	3	27	.100	7th	Did not qualify			
2006–07	Hsu Chin-Che	7	23	.233	6th	Did not qualify			
2007–08	Hsu Chin-Che	15	15	.500	4th	1	3	.250	Lost Semifinals to Yulon Dinos, 1-3
2009	Hsu Chin-Che	14	16	.467	4th	0	3	.000	Lost Semifinals to Dacin Tigers, 0-3
2010	Hsu Chin-Che	17	13	.567	3rd	2	3	.400	Lost Semifinals to Yulon Luxgen Dinos, 2-3
2010–11	Hsu Chin-Che	19	11	.633	2nd	1	4	.200	Lost Semifinals to Dacin Tigers, 1-4
2011–12	Hsu Chin-Che	22	8	.733	1st	8	1	.889	Won Semifinals vs New Taipei Yulon Luxgen Dinos, 4-1; Won Finals vs Taipei Dacin Tigers, 4-0
2012–13	Hsu Chin-Che	26	4	.867	1st	8	4	.667	Won Semifinals vs New Taipei Yulon Luxgen Dinos, 4-2; Won Finals vs Taipei Dacin Tigers, 4-2
2013–14	Hsu Chin-Che	24	6	.800	1st	8	2	.800	Won Semifinals vs Taipei Dacin Tigers, 4-1; Won Finals vs Taiwan Mobile, 4-1
2014–15	Hsu Chin-Che	23	7	.767	1st	8	4	.667	Won Semifinals vs New Taipei Yulon Luxgen Dinos, 4-1; Won Finals vs Taiwan Beer, 4-3
2015–16	Ben Metcalf	21	9	.700	1st	6	6	.500	Won Semifinals vs Fubon Braves, 4-2; Lost Finals to Taiwan Beer, 2-4
2016–17	Ben Metcalf	14	16	.467	5th	4	4	.500	Won First Round vs Fubon Braves, 3-1; Lost Semifinals to Taipei Dacin Tigers, 1-4
2017–18	Ben Metcalf	18	12	.600	2nd	8	4	.667	Won Semifinals vs Kinmen Kaoliang Liquor, 4-2; Won Finals vs Fubon Braves, 4-2
2018–19	Ben Metcalf	20	16	.556	3rd	4	5	.444	Won First Round vs Taipei Dacin Tigers, 3-1; Lost Semifinals to Taiwan Beer, 2-4
2019–20	Ben Metcalf	17	15	.531	2nd	0	3	.000	Lost Playoffs to Yulon Luxgen Dinos, 0-3
2020–21	Yen Hsing-Shu	14	26	.350	5th	Did not qualify			
2021–22	Huang Chi-Feng	3	27	.100	5th	Season early ended due to COVID-19 pandemic			
Totals		294	288	.505	-	61	50	.550	14 Playoff Appearances

== Honours ==
ABA Club Championship

- Champions (1): 2011
- Runners-up (1): 2012

== See also ==
- Chinese Basketball Alliance (Taiwan)
- Chinese Basketball Association (PRC)
- Super Basketball League (SBL)
- Taoyuan Pauian Pilots
