= Chinese Basketball Alliance =

Defunct men's basketball league in Taiwan

Chinese Basketball Alliance (中華職業籃球聯盟)
- Sport: Basketball
- Founded: 1994
- Folded: 1999
- No. of teams: 4 (1994–1995); 6 (1996–1999)
- Country: Taiwan
- Continent: FIBA Asia
- Most titles: Hung Kuo Elephants (3 titles)
- Broadcasters: Chinese Television System; ETTV (東森電視)

The Chinese Basketball Alliance (Chinese: 中華職業籃球聯盟; CBA) was a men's professional basketball league in Taiwan that existed from 1995 to 1999. Also abbreviated as "CBA", the defunct organization based in Taiwan was distinct from the Chinese Basketball Association of the People's Republic of China (PRC) and was also not to be confused with the Continental Basketball Association of the United States. In this article, "CBA" refers to the first organization if not otherwise specified.

== Overview of organizational history ==
Founded in 1994 with four champion teams from Taiwan's amateur Division A conference (甲組聯賽), the CBA was Taiwan's second professional sports league next to the Chinese Professional Baseball League (CPBL), and was among the earliest professional basketball leagues in Asia. Following the regnal year tradition in East Asia, the CBA officially named its first season, 1994–1995, the "CBA Inaugural Year" (職籃元年), the 1995–1996 season the "CBA Second Year", and so forth. Four seasons were completed before the game was suddenly halted in 1999 in the middle of an unfinished fifth due to financial difficulties.

Having had survived the 1995-1996 Taiwan Strait Crisis, the CBA was viciously affected by the repercussions of the Asian Financial Crisis two years later. Decreased attendance aside, a factor that had a direct bearing on the sudden close down of the CBA was the dispute between the organization and its television partner, the Eastern Broadcasting Co., Ltd. (東森電視; ETTV), over the proper level of the broadcasting royalties. Shortly after the latter ceased to make royalty payments as contracted, the CBA ran out of financial means to sustain its operating budget and had to stop its operations.

== Participating clubs and champions ==
Since its second season, the CBA had expanded to include a total of six clubs. They were: Yulon Dinos (裕隆恐龍), Hung Kuo Elephants (宏國象), Tera/Kaohsiung Mars (泰瑞/高雄戰神), LUCKIPar(幸福豹) (幸福豹) in addition to the incoming Hung Fu Rams (宏福公羊) and Chung-Hsing/Dacin Tigers (中興/達欣虎). The history of the CBA was marked by a "Hung Kuo dynasty" (宏國王朝) where the Elephants won three consecutive championships. The champion team and runner-up of each year are listed below:

Year	Champion	Runner-up
CBA Inaugural Year (1994–1995)	Yulon Dinos	
CBA Second Year (1995–1996)	Hung Kuo Elephants	Yulon Dinos
CBA Third Year (1996–1997)	Hung Kuo Elephants	Yulon Dinos
CBA Fourth Year (1997–1998)	Hung Kuo Elephants	Kaohsiung Mars
CBA Fifth Year (1998–1999, unfinished)	Undecided	

Caught in the economic turbulence of the late 1990s, the corporate owners/sponsors of various CBA clubs decided to withdraw from professional sports. Consequently, the Hung Kuo, Mars, LUCKIPar, and Hung Fu teams came under the danger of disbandment around the same period when the CBA closed down. At the turn of the 20th century, only two out of the six clubs that had participated in the CBA, namely, Yulon and Dacin, had managed to survive with the original organizations. Whereas the Mars was allowed to kept its roster and its name under new ownership by the Broadcasting Corporation of China, most of the original Hung Kuo Elephants were able to continue playing together as the Sina Lions (新浪獅) after their new corporate owner, Sina.com. These four clubs subsequently became founding members of the Super Basketball League (SBL) when the semi-professional league was created in 2003. Many have viewed this new league as the successor body to the CBA.

Less fortunate, the LUCKIPar and Hung Fu teams disappeared permanently.

== Policy and rules on imported players ==
The CBA distinguished the origin of a player as an array of height and playing chance limitations would be applied to imported players—the so-called yáng jiàng (洋將; literally, "commanders/warriors that come through the sea") – but not to local players (本土球員). In implementing this, however, players with "Chinese consanguinity" (華裔球員) – however vague such definition was—could be regarded as if they were local upon consensus among all member clubs. Such exemptions had allowed a number of players from mainland China, Hong Kong, and the United States to play without height and number limitations.

Initially, each team was allowed to register 3 non-Chinese foreign players and put up to 2 of them onto the court. No height limitations were in place in the first three seasons. Beginning from the CBA Fourth Year, however, non-Chinese imports were divided into the "bigger" and the "smaller" categories by height. Foreign players who were 201 cm (6'7") or taller were regarded as "big", and only one such player would be allowed to play on the court for a team. In the meantime, no more foreign players 208 cm (6 ft 10 in) or taller could be signed—although in previous seasons several seven-footers had made their appearances in the game. This was a response to some watchers' complaint that the league was dominated by foreign players, especially by those oversized imports from inside the paint. In the 1990s, native Taiwanese players who were two metres or taller were rare, and, as reflected in the statistics, local players had rarely turned out to be a leading rebounder or shot-blocker on a CBA team.

== Most Valuable Players and other notable figures ==
Year	Regular season MVP	Championship Series MVP
CBA Inaugural Year (1994–1995)	Tung-fang Chieh-Teh (東方介德) (Yulon)	
CBA Second Year (1995–1996)	Cheng Chih-lung (鄭志龍) (Hung Kuo)	
CBA Third Year (1996–1997)	Todd Rowe (泰勒) (Mars)	
CBA Fourth Year (1997–1998)	Chou Chun-San (周俊三) (Hung Kuo)	Cheng Chih-lung (鄭志龍) (Hung Kuo)

=== Coaches ===
- Chien Yi-Fei (錢一飛): Born in Taiwan; then head coach for Yulon; former head coach for Chinese Taipei men's national basketball team
- Chung Chih-Mong (鍾枝萌): Born in Taiwan; then head coach and de facto general manager for the Mars; former head coach for Chinese Taipei men's national basketball team
- Paul Coughter (保羅): Born in New York City, USA; then head coach for Hung Kuo in its second and third championship seasons; former head coach for a number of national teams including Pakistan, South Africa, Bahrain, and Lebanon
- Lee Chung-hee (Chinese character: 李忠熙; Hangul: 이충희): Born in South Korea; then head coach for Hung Kuo in its first two seasons in the CBA following retirement as player on the team; former member of the South Korean men's national basketball team, legendary three-point shooter in Asia, currently coaching in South Korea

=== Local forwards ===
- Chen Zhenghao (simplified Chinese: 陈政皓; traditional Chinese: 陳政皓): Born in Shanghai, China; 6'5", then small forward for Hung Fu; former member of China men's national basketball team, currently basketball analyst for ESPN Star Sports
- Li Yun-Hsiang (李雲翔): Born in Taiwan; 6'3", then small forward/point guard for Hung Fu; member of Chinese Taipei men's national basketball team in the 1990s, former FIBA Asian All-Star, currently basketball commentator for ESPN Star Sports
- Tung-fang Chieh-Teh (東方介德): Born in Taiwan; 6'4", then small forward for Yulon, first Most Valuable Player (MVP) of the CBA; member of Chinese Taipei men's national basketball team from the late 1980s to the mid-1990s, currently assistant coach for Yulon

=== Local centres ===
- Conant Chi (朱志清): Born in California, U.S.A.; 6'6", then centre/power forward for Hung Fu; primary centre for Chinese Taipei men's national basketball team from the late 1980s through the 1990s
- Song Tao: Born in Shandong, China; 6'10", then centre/power forward for LUCKIPar and Yulon; member of China men's national basketball team at 1988 Summer Olympics, 1987 NBA draftee
- Wang Libin (王立彬): Born in Shaanxi, China; 6'8", then centre for the Mars; member of China men's national basketball team at 1984 and 1988 Summer Olympics, former assistant coach for Chinese Taipei men's national basketball team, former ESPN Star Sports basketball analyst, former head coach for the Shaanxi Kylins of the PRC-based professional league

=== Local guards ===
- Chou Chun-San (周俊三): Born in Taiwan; 5'9", then point guard (PG) and captain for Hung Kuo, three-time assist champion of the CBA; primary PG for Chinese Taipei men's national basketball team in the 1990s, two-time assist champion of the PRC-based professional league, currently executive coach for Taiwan Beer of the SBL
- Cheng Chih-lung (鄭志龍): Born in Taiwan; 6'3", then shooting guard for Hung Kuo, regular season and finals MVP of the CBA; primary scorer as small forward for Chinese Taipei men's national basketball team between 1989 and 1999, former FIBA Asian All-Star, former member of the Legislative Yuan of the Republic of China, currently head coach for Taiwan Mobile Clouded Leopards of the SBL
- Li Yun-Kuang (李雲光): Born in Taiwan; 5'8", then point guard for Yulon, three-time steal champion of the CBA; member of Chinese Taipei men's national basketball team from the late 1980s to the mid-1990s, former head coach for the Chinese Taipei men's team and Yulon
- Luo Hsing-Liang (羅興樑): Born in Taiwan; 6'0", then shooting guard for Hung Kuo and Dacin; member of Chinese Taipei men's national basketball team in the 1990s, former FIBA Asian All-Star, former three-point field goal champion (most made) of the PRC-based professional league, currently player in the SBL
- Yen Hsing-su (顏行書): Born in Taiwan; 6'0", then point guard for the Mars, one-time assist champion; member of Chinese Taipei men's national basketball team between the mid-1990s and the early 2000s (decade), currently player in the PRC-based professional league and the SBL
- Zhang Xuelei (simplified Chinese: 张学雷; traditional Chinese: 張學雷): Born in Liaoning Province, PRC; 6'8", then shooting guard for LUCKIPar; former member of China men's national basketball team, currently head coach of Yulon

=== Imports ===
- Johnny Rhodes (羅德斯): Born in the USA; 6'4", then shooting guard for Hung Fu; former scoring leader for University of Maryland, former player in various professional leagues across the globe
- Todd Rowe (泰勒): Born in the USA; 6'7", then small forward for the Mars, MVP, four-time scoring and one-time shot-block champion of the CBA; former player for Malone College in Ohio, as well as in the PRC-based professional league and in Japan
- Bennett Russell (班尼特): Born in the USA; 6'8", then centre for Dacin, rebound champion of the CBA; player on the Chinese Taipei team at Asian Club Championships in the late 1990s
- Corey Williams (威廉斯): Born in Georgia, USA; 6'1", then point guard for Dacin; former player for Oklahoma State University, 1992-1993 NBA champion (with the Chicago Bulls), currently assistant coach at Florida State University

== See also ==
- Asian Financial Crisis (1997)
- Chinese Basketball Association (mainland China)
- Chinese Taipei men's national basketball team
- Dacin Tigers
- List of basketball leagues
- Pure-Youth Construction Basketball Team
- Sport in Taiwan
- Super Basketball League (SBL)
- Taiwan Mobile Clouded Leopards
- Women's Super Basketball League (WSBL)
- Yulon Dinos
