= Walter Sharpe =

American basketball player (born 1986)

No. 33 – Yulon
- Position: Power forward / center
- League: Super Basketball League

Personal information
- Born: July 18, 1986 (age 40) Huntsville, Alabama, U.S.
- Listed height: 6 ft 9 in (2.06 m)
- Listed weight: 245 lb (111 kg)

Career information
- High school: Parker (Birmingham, Alabama)
- College: Mississippi State (2004–2006); UAB (2007–2008)
- NBA draft: 2008: 2nd round, 32nd overall pick
- Drafted by: Seattle SuperSonics
- Playing career: 2008–present

Career history
- 2008–2009: Detroit Pistons
- 2009: →Fort Wayne Mad Ants
- 2010: Idaho Stampede
- 2010–2011: Dakota Wizards
- 2011: New Mexico Thunderbirds
- 2012: Guangzhou Free Man
- 2013: GlobalPort Batang Pier
- 2014: Leones de Ponce
- 2014: Reales de La Vega
- 2014: Brujos de Guayama
- 2015: Cocodrilos de Caracas
- 2015: Shaanxi Xinda
- 2016: Reales de La Vega
- 2018: Soles de Mexicali
- 2018: Taiwan Beer
- 2018–2019: Kinmen Kaoliang Liquor
- 2019: Yulon Luxgen Dinos
- 2022–present: Yulon Luxgen Dinos / Yulon
- Stats at NBA.com
- Stats at Basketball Reference

Walter L. Sharpe III (born July 18, 1986) is an American professional basketball player for Yulon of the Super Basketball League (SBL).

== Early career ==
Sharpe attended Parker High School in Birmingham, Alabama.

Considered a four-star recruit by Rivals.com, Sharpe was listed as the No. 9 power forward and the No. 44 player in the nation in 2004.

He later signed with Mississippi State University. Sharpe's career at Mississippi State was suspended frequently during his freshman season, declared academically ineligible during his sophomore season and eventually left the team.

He transferred to the University of Alabama at Birmingham, where he averaged 14.2 points per game in 12 games before being declared academically ineligible for the spring semester of the 2007–08 season.

== Professional career ==
He was selected as the 32nd overall pick by the Seattle SuperSonics in the 2008 NBA draft. Shortly after being drafted, the Sonics traded his rights to the Detroit Pistons. Shortly after being drafted, Sharpe was diagnosed with narcolepsy, a sleeping disorder that causes excessive sleepiness.

On July 13, 2009, he was traded along with Arron Afflalo to the Denver Nuggets for a second-round pick in the 2011 NBA draft.

On July 31, 2009, he was traded along with Sonny Weems and cash considerations to the Milwaukee Bucks for Malik Allen. On October 26, 2009, he was waived by the Bucks.

On December 9, 2011, Sharpe signed with the Memphis Grizzlies for the lockout-shortened 2011–12 season's training camp. On December 23, two days before the start of the regular season, Sharpe was waived by the Grizzlies.

In March 2013, he signed with GlobalPort Batang Pier of the PBA, replacing Justin Williams as their import. On March 19, 2013, GlobalPort Batang Pier terminated his contract due to "conduct unbecoming of a professional basketball player" after a controversial photo of him sleeping on parking lot pavement went viral. GlobalPort Batang Pier team manager BJ Manalo said that they "will not tolerate actions of any local or foreign player who destroys the integrity" of both their team and that of the PBA. Sharpe played only two games in the PBA.

On July 1, 2014, he signed with Brujos de Guayama of Puerto Rico. He left Guayama after appearing in only one game.

On February 9, 2015, he signed with Cocodrilos de Caracas of Venezuela for the 2015 LPB season.

== NBA career statistics ==
Legend
GP	Games played	GS	Games started	MPG	Minutes per game
FG%	Field goal percentage	3P%	3-point field goal percentage	FT%	Free throw percentage
RPG	Rebounds per game	APG	Assists per game	SPG	Steals per game
BPG	Blocks per game	PPG	Points per game	**Bold**	Career high

=== Regular season ===
Year	Team	GP	GS	MPG	FG%	3P%	FT%	RPG	APG	SPG	BPG	PPG
2008–09	Detroit	8	0	2.5	.364	.000	.000	.4	.0	.0	.2	1.0
Career		8	0	2.5	.364	.000	.000	.4	.0	.0	.2	1.0
