= Corey Williams (basketball, born 1970) =

American basketball player and coach

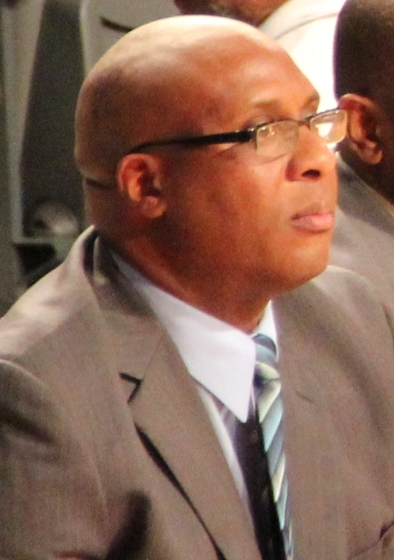
- Williams in 2013

Auburn Tigers
- Title: Assistant coach
- League: Southeastern Conference

Personal information
- Born: April 24, 1970 (age 56) Twiggs County, Georgia, U.S.
- Listed height: 6 ft 2 in (1.88 m)
- Listed weight: 190 lb (86 kg)

Career information
- High school: Northeast (Macon, Georgia)
- College: Oklahoma State (1988–1992)
- NBA draft: 1992: 2nd round, 33rd overall pick
- Drafted by: Chicago Bulls
- Playing career: 1992–1998
- Position: Point guard
- Number: 12
- Coaching career: 2000–present

Career history

Playing
- 1992–1993: Chicago Bulls
- 1993–1994: Oklahoma City Cavalry
- 1994: Minnesota Timberwolves
- 1994–1995: Grand Rapids Mackers
- 1995–1998: Dacin Tigers

Coaching
- 1994: Oklahoma State (assistant)
- 2000–2007: Oral Roberts (assistant)
- 2007–2013: Florida State (assistant)
- 2013–2019: Stetson
- 2019–2021: Arkansas (assistant)
- 2021–2023: Texas Tech (assistant)
- 2023: Texas Tech (interim)
- 2023–present: Auburn (assistant)

Career highlights
- NBA champion (1993)

Career NBA statistics
- Points: 92 (2.4 ppg)
- Rebounds: 37 (0.9 rpg)
- Assists: 29 (0.7 apg)
- Stats at NBA.com
- Stats at Basketball Reference

Corey Williams (born April 24, 1970) is an American retired professional basketball player and assistant coach for the Auburn Tigers of the SEC Conference. He is the former men's basketball head coach of Stetson University.

A 6 ft 2 in (1.88 m) point guard from Oklahoma State University, Williams was selected by the Chicago Bulls in the second round of the 1992 NBA draft. He played one season with the Bulls, averaging 2.3 points in 35 games as a reserve on a team which won the NBA Championship. He then spent the 1993–94 season with the Minnesota Timberwolves, scoring 11 points in 4 games. He spent the majority of the 1994 season with the Oklahoma City Cavalry of the Continental Basketball Association.

Williams was also selected by the Kansas City Chiefs in the twelfth round of the 1992 NFL draft, despite not having played football since junior high. He never joined the Chiefs.

After his playing career in the American professional leagues, Williams returned to Oklahoma State as a student assistant and was a member of the Cowboys' staff during their 1994 Final Four season. In 1995, Williams resumed to play professionally as he joined the Dacin Tigers of the Chinese Basketball Alliance in Taiwan. He was the assist leader and one of the main scorers for his team throughout the three seasons he played there until 1998. From 2000 to 2007, Williams was an assistant coach at Oral Roberts, and from 2007 to 2013 he was an assistant coach at Florida State University.

On June 3, 2013, Williams was named the head coach of Stetson. He was fired on March 6, 2019, with a six-year record of 58–133.

== Head coaching record ==
Record table
| Season | Team | Overall | Conference | Standing | Postseason |
|---|---|---|---|---|---|
Stetson Hatters (ASUN Conference) (2013–2019)
| 2013–14 | Stetson | 7–24 | 5–13 | 8th | |
| 2014–15 | Stetson | 9–22 | 3–11 | 8th | |
| 2015–16 | Stetson | 12–22 | 4–10 | T–7th | |
| 2016–17 | Stetson | 11–21 | 3–11 | T–7th | |
| 2017–18 | Stetson | 12–20 | 4–10 | 7th | |
| 2018–19 | Stetson | 7–24 | 3–13 | T–8th | |
| Stetson: | | 58–133 (.304) | 22–68 (.244) | | |
Texas Tech Red Raiders (Big 12 Conference) (2023)
| 2022–23 | Texas Tech | 0–1 | 0–0 | | |
| Texas Tech: | | 0–1 (.000) | 0–0 (–) | | |
| Total: | | 58–134 (.302) | | | |
National champion Postseason invitational champion Conference regular season champion Conference regular season and conference tournament champion Division regular season champion Division regular season and conference tournament champion Conference tournament champion
