= Cheng Chih-lung =

Cheng Chih-lung may refer to:

- Cheng Chih-lung (basketball) (born 1969), a Taiwanese basketball player/coach and politician
- Zheng Zhilong (1604–1661), a pirate and warlord during the Ming and Qing dynasties
