= Jawann Oldham =

American basketball player (1957–2026)

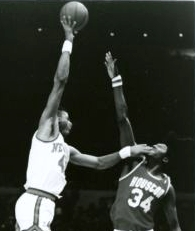
- Oldham (left) and Hakeem Olajuwon in 1986

Personal information
- Born: July 4, 1957 Chicago, Illinois, U.S.
- Died: January 5, 2026 (aged 68) Atlanta, Georgia, U.S.
- Listed height: 7 ft 0 in (2.13 m)
- Listed weight: 215 lb (98 kg)

Career information
- High school: Cleveland (Seattle, Washington)
- College: Seattle (1976–1980)
- NBA draft: 1980: 2nd round, 41st overall pick
- Drafted by: Denver Nuggets
- Playing career: 1980–1997
- Position: Center
- Number: 45, 51, 33, 44, 32, 50, 55, 22

Career history

Playing
- 1980: Denver Nuggets
- 1980–1981: Montana Golden Nuggets
- 1981–1982: Houston Rockets
- 1983–1986: Chicago Bulls
- 1986–1987: New York Knicks
- 1987–1988: Sacramento Kings
- 1989–1990: Santa Barbara Islanders
- 1990: Orlando Magic
- 1990: Los Angeles Lakers
- 1990–1991: Rapid City Thrillers
- 1991: Indiana Pacers
- 1991–1992: Tulsa Zone
- 1992–1993: Oklahoma City Cavalry
- 1993: Capitanes de Arecibo
- 1995–1996: Chicago Rockers
- 1996: Hung Kuo Elephants
- 1996–1997: Tianjin Bay Pioneers
- 1997: Hung Kuo Elephants

Coaching
- 2005–2006: Oita Heat Devils

Career highlights
- 2× Chinese Basketball Alliance champion (1996, 1997); CBA All-Defensive Team (1992); CBA blocks leader (1992); Third-team Parade All-American (1976)

Career NBA statistics
- Points: 1,455 (4.4 ppg)
- Rebounds: 1,353 (4.1 rpg)
- Blocks: 546 (1.7 bpg)
- Stats at NBA.com
- Stats at Basketball Reference

Jawann Oldham (July 4, 1957 – January 5, 2026) was an American professional basketball player who was a center in the National Basketball Association (NBA). He played college basketball for the Seattle Redhawks before being selected by the Denver Nuggets in the second round of the 1980 NBA draft. Oldham played 10 seasons in the NBA for eight teams.

== Early life and college career ==
Oldham was born in Chicago and grew up in Seattle, where he attended Cleveland High School and Seattle University, with 1,530 points and 965 rebounds during his college career, after which he was selected by the Denver Nuggets in the second round of the 1980 NBA draft with the 41st overall pick.

== Career ==
=== NBA ===
In his NBA career, Oldham played in 329 games and scored a total of 1,455 points, playing for the Nuggets, Houston Rockets, Chicago Bulls, New York Knicks, Sacramento Kings, Orlando Magic, Los Angeles Lakers and Indiana Pacers. He was the last Bulls player to wear #33 before Scottie Pippen.

=== CBA ===
Oldham played in the Continental Basketball Association (CBA) for the Montana Golden Nuggets during the 1980–81 season, Santa Barbara Islanders during the 1989–90 season, Rapid City Thrillers during the 1990–91 season, Tulsa Zone during the 1991–92 season, Oklahoma City Cavalry during the 1992–93 season and Chicago Rockers during the 1995–96 season. He was selected to the CBA All-Defensive Team in 1992.

=== International ===
Oldham won gold as part of the US basketball team at the 1979 Summer Universiade.

=== Post-NBA ===
Oldham was instrumental in founding the Korean Basketball League in South Korea and the Chinese New Basketball Alliance (CNBA) in China in the 1990s, and developed and coached for the bj league in Japan; the Jawann Oldham Professional Development Basketball Academy operates in Dubai and Abu Dhabi.

In March 1996, Oldham joined the Hung Kuo Elephants of the Chinese Basketball Alliance (CBA) in Taiwan. In June 1996, Oldham won his first championship ring of his career. Oldham decided not return to the Hung Kuo Elephants in the 1996–97 season, joined the Tianjin Bay Pioneers of the newly formed Chinese New Basketball Alliance (CNBA) in China. In May 1997, Oldham returned to the Hung Kuo Elephants. In August 1997, Oldham won his second CBA champion. Oldham would be unable to play for Hung Kuo Elephants next season because CBA has introduced a height restriction.

== Death ==
Oldham died in Atlanta, Georgia, on January 5, 2026, at the age of 68.

== Career playing statistics ==
Legend
GP	Games played	GS	Games started	MPG	Minutes per game
FG%	Field goal percentage	3P%	3-point field goal percentage	FT%	Free throw percentage
RPG	Rebounds per game	APG	Assists per game	SPG	Steals per game
BPG	Blocks per game	PPG	Points per game	**Bold**	Career high

=== NBA ===
==== Regular season ====
Year	Team	GP	GS	MPG	FG%	3P%	FT%	RPG	APG	SPG	BPG	PPG
1980–81	Denver	4		5.3	.333	–	–	1.3	.0	.0	.5	1.0
1981–82	Houston	22	0	5.6	.361	–	.571	1.1	.1	.1	.5	1.5
1982–83	Chicago	16	0	10.7	.534	–	.545	2.9	.3	.3	.8	4.6
1983–84	Chicago	**64**	0	13.6	.505	–	.591	3.6	.5	.2	1.2	4.0
1984–85	Chicago	63	0	15.8	.464	.000	**.680**	3.7	.5	.2	2.0	3.4
1985–86	Chicago	52	**47**	**24.5**	.517	.000	.582	**5.9**	**.7**	.5	**2.6**	**7.4**
1986–87	New York	44	9	17.6	.408	.000	.544	4.1	.4	.5	1.6	3.9
1987–88	Sacramento	54	13	17.5	.476	–	.678	5.6	.6	.2	2.0	5.5
1989–90	Orlando	3	0	12.0	.333	–	.400	5.0	.0	**.7**	1.0	1.3
1989–90	Los Angeles	3	0	3.0	**.667**	–	.500	.3	.3	.0	.0	1.7
1990–91	Pacers	4	0	4.8	.500	–	–	.8	.0	.0	.0	1.5
Career		329	69	15.9	.479	.000	.607	4.1	.5	.3	1.7	4.4

==== Playoffs ====
Year	Team	GP	GS	MPG	FG%	3P%	FT%	RPG	APG	SPG	BPG	PPG
1985	Chicago	**4**	0	**22.8**	**.467**	–	–	**5.5**	**.8**	**1.5**	**1.8**	**3.5**
1986	Chicago	1	0	4.0	.000	–	–	2.0	.0	.0	.0	.0
Career		5	0	19.0	.438	–	–	4.8	.6	1.2	1.4	2.8

== Head coaching record ==
=== bj league ===
Legend
Regular season	G	Games coached	W	Games won	L	Games lost	W–L %	Win–loss %
Playoffs	PG	Playoff games	PW	Playoff wins	PL	Playoff losses	PW–L %	Playoff win–loss %

Team	Year	G	W	L	W–L%	Finish	PG	PW	PL	PW–L%	Result
Oita Heat Devils	2005-06	16	4	12	.250	Fired	-	-	-	–	-
