= Yulon (basketball) =

Taiwanese basketball club

- League: SBL
- Founded: 1965
- History: Yulon; 1965–1994, 2024–present Yulon Dinos; 1994–2009; New Taipei Yulon Luxgen Dinos; 2012–2015; Yulon Luxgen Dinos; 2009–2012, 2015–2024
- President: Chen Li-lian
- Head coach: Lee Chi-Yi
- Ownership: Yulon
- Championships: 10; CBA: 1 (1995); SBL: 9 (2004, 2005, 2006, 2010, 2021, 2023, 2024, 2025, 2026)
- Website: sleague.tw/squad/10729

Yulon is a professional basketball team in the Super Basketball League in Taiwan. It was founded in 1965 by Yulon Motor's (or the Taiwanese Car Manufacturer Luxgen) Chairman Yen Ching-ling as a First Division amateur basketball team. It has also been member of the short-lived Chinese Basketball Alliance, a professional basketball league that existed from 1994 to 1998.

== Current roster ==
Yulon roster
Players
Coaches

Pos.	No.	Nat.	Name	Ht.	Wt.	Age	From
G	0	(Taiwan)	Wei Tzu-Yun	1.82 m (6 ft 0 in)	80 kg (176 lb)	23 – 31 January 2003	NTUS
C	1	(United States)	Brandon Moss (FA)	2.04 m (6 ft 8 in)	93 kg (205 lb)	32 – 5 March 1994	LSUA
PG	2	(Taiwan)	Kao Cheng-En	1.75 m (5 ft 9 in)	78 kg (172 lb)	26 – 23 December 1999	UCH
G	4	(Taiwan)	Lin Shih-Hsuan	1.78 m (5 ft 10 in)	77 kg (170 lb)	27 – 28 December 1998	NTNU
G	5	(Taiwan)	Pu Kuo-Lun	1.95 m (6 ft 5 in)	85 kg (187 lb)	25 – 9 August 2001	ISU
G	6	(Taiwan)	Wang Yi-Fan	1.73 m (5 ft 8 in)	72 kg (159 lb)	25 – 19 November 2000	FJU
F	7	(Taiwan)	Chen Chun-Nan	1.90 m (6 ft 3 in)	90 kg (198 lb)	26 – 20 April 2000	NTSU
G	8	(Taiwan)	Tung Fang Yi-Kang	1.82 m (6 ft 0 in)	81 kg (179 lb)	28 – 12 October 1997	Washington
F	9	(Taiwan)	Chung Chun-Wei	1.90 m (6 ft 3 in)	78 kg (172 lb)	23 – 18 December 2002	HWU
F	11	(Taiwan)	Wang Kai-Yu	1.90 m (6 ft 3 in)	85 kg (187 lb)	24 – 11 January 2002	NCCU
C	12	(Nigeria)	John Ameh Peters (FS)	2.05 m (6 ft 9 in)	105 kg (231 lb)	25 – 7 January 2001	CCU
SF	16	(Taiwan)	Lo Kai-Hsiang	1.91 m (6 ft 3 in)	80 kg (176 lb)	23 – 13 June 2003	NTUS
G	17	(Taiwan)	Lin Yi-En	1.85 m (6 ft 1 in)	80 kg (176 lb)	30 – 8 June 1996	CCU
F	21	(Taiwan)	Tu Yi-Han	1.90 m (6 ft 3 in)	89 kg (196 lb)	25 – 28 December 2000	NCCU
F	23	(Taiwan)	Lan Shao-Fu	1.95 m (6 ft 5 in)	98 kg (216 lb)	29 – 21 March 1997	NTSU
F	31	(Taiwan)	Huang Tsung-Han	1.95 m (6 ft 5 in)	90 kg (198 lb)	29 – 10 October 1996	NTNU
C	54	(Taiwan)	Wu Tai-Hao	2.03 m (6 ft 8 in)	106 kg (234 lb)	41 – 7 February 1985	NTNU
F	56	(Taiwan)	Liu Chun-Ting	1.87 m (6 ft 2 in)	78 kg (172 lb)	27 – 31 March 1999	UCH
PG	89	(Taiwan)	Lin Ming-Yi	1.76 m (5 ft 9 in)	70 kg (154 lb)	30 – 27 March 1996	MDU
G	-	(Taiwan)	Pan Yan-Kai (DP)	1.72 m (5 ft 8 in)	62 kg (137 lb)	21 – 4 October 2004	NTNU

Head coach

- (Taiwan) Lee Chi-Yi

Assistant coach(es)

- (Taiwan) Chou Shih-Yuan
- (Taiwan) Tsai Fu-Tsai
- (Taiwan) Wei Yung-Tai

Athletic trainer(s)

- (Taiwan) Wei Chia-Wei

Legend

- (C) Team captain
- (FA) Free agent
- (FS) Foreign student player
- (DP) Unsigned draft pick
- Injured

- Roster
Updated: 2026-08-03

== Notable players ==
Note: Flags indicate national team eligibility at FIBA-sanctioned events. Players may hold other non-FIBA nationalities not displayed.

Criteria

To appear in this section a player must have either:

- Set a club record or won an individual award while at the club
- Played at least one official international match for their national team at any time
- Played at least one official NBA match at any time.

- Solomon Alabi
- Sim Bhullar
- Derrick Caracter
- Chen Chien-Hsun
- Chen Chih-Chung
- Chen Hsin-An
- Chen Shih-Nien
- Chiu Tsung-Chih
- Chou Po-Chen
- Chou Shih-Yuan
- Rakeem Christmas
- Douglas Creighton
- Eric Dawson
- Hsu Tung-Ching
- Ke Chi-Hao
- Herve Lamizana
- Lee Chi-Yi
- Lee Hsueh-Lin
- Lee Kai-Yan
- Lee Te-Wei
- Lee Yun-Kuang
- Lin Chien-Ping
- Lin Yi-Huei
- Lu Cheng-Ju
- Luke Nevill
- Sani Sakakini
- Walter Sharpe
- Garret Siler
- Song Tao
- Tsai Fu-Tsai
- Tseng Wen-Ting
- Tung Fang Chieh-Te
- Wu Chien-Lung
- Wu Feng-Cheng
- Wu Tai-Hao
- Yang Che-Yi

== Head coaches ==
#	Name	Term	GC	W	L	Win%	GC	W	L	Win%	Achievements
#	Name	Term	Regular season				Playoffs				Achievements
Yulon Dinos
1	Chien Yi-Fei	2003–2007	114	90	24	.789	29	20	9	.690	2003–2004 SBL Coach of the Year. 3 championships (2004, 2005, 2006)
2	Zhang Xuelei	2007–2008	30	23	7	.767	10	5	5	.500	
Yulon Luxgen Dinos
–	Zhang Xuelei	2009–2011	90	55	35	.611	18	7	11	.389	1 championship (2010)
New Taipei Yulon Luxgen Dinos
–	Zhang Xuelei	2011–2014	90	45	45	.500	11	3	8	.273	
3	Lin Cheng-Ming	2014–2015	30	14	16	.467	7	3	4	.429	
Yulon Luxgen Dinos
4	Wei Yung-Tai	2015–2018	90	55	35	.611	17	4	13	.235	
5	Lee Chi-Yi	2018–2020	68	34	34	.500	17	10	7	.588	
6	Chiu Ta-Tsung	2020–2023	100	62	38	.620	9	6	3	.667	2023 SBL Coach of the Year. 2 championships (2021, 2023)
–	Lee Chi-Yi	2024–present	88	52	36	.591	19	13	6	.684	3 championships (2024, 2025, 2026)

== Season-by-season record ==
Super Basketball League
Season	Coach	Regular season				Postseason			
Season	Coach	Won	Lost	Win %	Finish	Won	Lost	Win %	Result
2003–04	Chien Yi-Fei	19	5	.792	1st	5	1	.833	Won Semifinals vs BCC Mars, 2–1; Won Finals vs Sina Lions, 3–0
2004–05	Chien Yi-Fei	25	5	.833	1st	5	0	1.000	Won Semifinals vs Taiwan Beer, 2–0; Won Finals vs Dacin Tigers, 3–0
2005–06	Chien Yi-Fei	24	6	.800	1st	7	2	.778	Won Semifinals vs Bank of Taiwan, 3–1; Won Finals vs Taiwan Beer, 4–1
2006–07	Chien Yi-Fei	22	8	.733	1st	3	6	.333	Lost Semifinals to Dacin Tigers, 2–3; Lost Third Place to Videoland Hunters, 1–3
2007–08	Zhang Xuelei	23	7	.767	1st	5	5	.500	Won Semifinals vs Pauian Archiland, 3–1; Lost Finals to Taiwan Beer, 2–4
2009	Zhang Xuelei	21	9	.700	2nd	0	3	.000	Lost Semifinals to Taiwan Beer, 0–3
2010	Zhang Xuelei	19	11	.633	2nd	7	4	.636	Won Semifinals vs Pauian Archiland, 3–2; Won Finals vs Dacin Tigers, 4–2
2010–11	Zhang Xuelei	15	15	.500	4th	0	4	.000	Lost Semifinals to Taiwan Beer, 0–4
2011–12	Zhang Xuelei	16	14	.533	4th	1	4	.200	Lost Semifinals to Taichung Pauian Archiland, 1–4
2012–13	Zhang Xuelei	16	14	.533	4th	2	4	.333	Lost Semifinals to Taichung Pauian Archiland, 2–4
2013–14	Zhang Xuelei	13	17	.433	5th	Did not qualify			
2014–15	Lin Cheng-Ming	14	16	.467	4th	3	4	.429	Won First Round vs Bank of Taiwan, 3–0; Lost Semifinals to Taichung Pauian Archiland, 1–4
2015–16	Wei Yung-Tai	17	13	.567	4th	0	3	.000	Lost First Round to Fubon Braves, 1–3
2016–17	Wei Yung-Tai	19	11	.633	2nd	4	6	.400	Won Semifinals vs Taiwan Beer, 4–2; Lost Finals to Taipei Dacin Tigers, 0–4
2017–18	Wei Yung-Tai	19	11	.633	1st	0	4	.000	Lost Semifinals to Fubon Braves, 0–4
2018–19	Lee Chi-Yi	18	18	.500	4th	4	4	.500	Won First Round vs Kinmen Kaoliang Liquor, 3–0; Lost Semifinals to Fubon Braves, 2–4
2019–20	Lee Chi-Yi	16	16	.500	3rd	6	3	.667	Won Playoffs vs Taoyuan Pauian Archiland, 3–0; Lost Finals to Taiwan Beer, 3–4
2020–21	Chiu Ta-Tsung	26	14	.650	2nd	3	1	.750	Won Semifinals vs Bank of Taiwan, 3–1; Finals not held due to COVID-19 pandemic
2021–22	Chiu Ta-Tsung	17	13	.567	3rd	Season early ended due to COVID-19 pandemic			
2023	Chiu Ta-Tsung	19	11	.633	1st	3	2	.600	Won Finals vs Bank of Taiwan, 3–2
2024	Lee Chi-Yi	15	15	.500	3rd	5	3	.625	Won Semifinals vs Bank of Taiwan, 2–1; Won Finals vs Taiwan Beer, 3–2
2025	Lee Chi-Yi	18	12	.600	1st	3	0	1.000	Won Finals vs Bank of Taiwan, 3–0
2026	Lee Chi-Yi	19	9	.679	1st	5	3	.625	Won Semifinals vs Taiwan Beer, 2–1; Won Finals vs Caesar Keelung Black Kites, 3–2
Totals		400	240	.625	-	71	66	.518	21 Playoff Appearances
