= Wu Tai-hao =

Taiwanese basketball player

Wu Tai-Hao (吳岱豪)
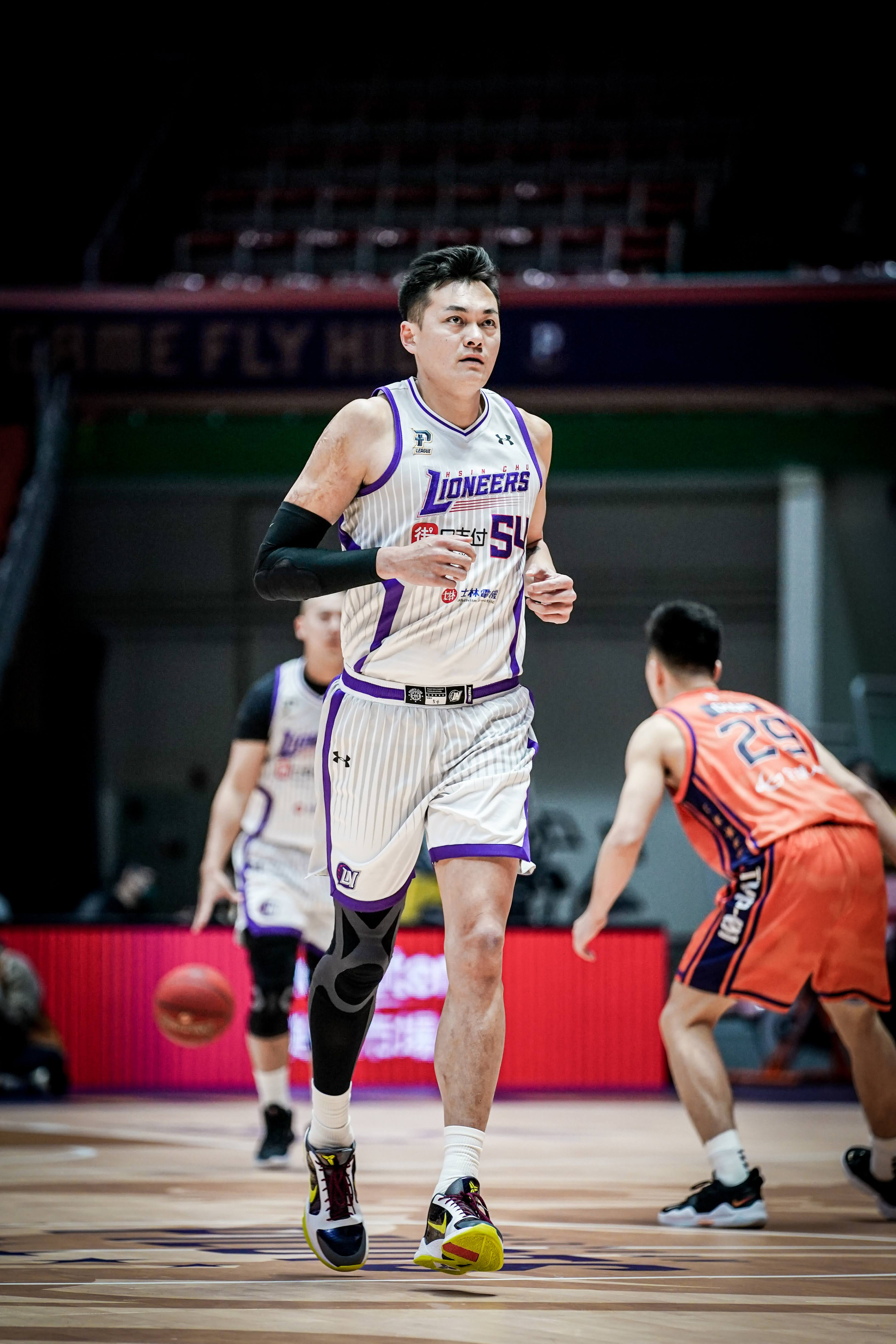

No. 54 – Yulon
- Position: Centre / power forward
- League: Super Basketball League

Personal information
- Born: February 7, 1985 (age 41) Taoyuan County (now Taoyuan City), Taiwan
- Listed height: 6 ft 8 in (2.03 m)
- Listed weight: 220 lb (100 kg)

Career information
- High school: Tsai Hsing (Taipei, Taiwan)
- College: Taipei Physical Education College; BYU–Hawaii (2006–2007)
- Playing career: 2002–present

Career history
- 2002–2003: Dacin Engineering
- 2003–2007: Jeoutai Technology
- 2007–2011: Taiwan Beer
- 2011–2012: Zhejiang Lions
- 2012–2015: Taiwan Mobile
- 2015–2016: Shanxi Brave Dragons
- 2016–2020: Taoyuan Pauian Archiland
- 2020–2022: Hsinchu Toplus Lioneers
- 2022–2024: TSG GhostHawks
- 2024–present: Yulon
Medals
Men's basketball
Representing Chinese Taipei
FIBA Asia Challenge
Bronze medal – third place	2004 Taipei
EABA Championship
Gold medal – first place	2017 Nagano
East Asian Games
Silver medal – second place	2001 Osaka
Silver medal – second place	2009 Hong Kong
ABC Under-18 Championship
Bronze medal – third place	2000 Kuala Lumpur

Wu Tai-Hao (Chinese: 吳岱豪; born February 7, 1985, in Taoyuan County (now Taoyuan City, Taiwan) is a Taiwanese basketball player for the Yulon of the Super Basketball League.

Wu plays centre for the Chinese Taipei men's national basketball team, as well as for his Taiwanese club teams, but had adjusted to play forward while competing in the Pacific West Conference, a Division II league of the NCAA, as a member of the Brigham Young University–Hawaii varsity team. As a starter, he averaged 24.6 minutes, 10.7 points, 5.3 rebounds, and 1.6 blocks per game in the 2006-2007 season.

After his brief college basketball career in the United States, Wu returned to Taiwan to play in the Super Basketball League where he won a shot-block champion title and helped the Taiwan Beer club team to its second championship in 2008.

Averaging 6.9 points and 3.7 rebounds per game, Wu helped the Chinese Taipei national team to an improved fifth-place finish at the FIBA Asia Championship 2009.

On July 22, 2022, Wu signed with the Tainan TSG GhostHawks of the T1 League. On August 28, 2023, Wu re-signed with the Tainan TSG GhostHawks.

On January 4, 2024, Wu moved to the Yulon Luxgen Dinos of the Super Basketball League due to players communication agreement with Tainan TSG GhostHawks and Yulon Luxgen Dinos. On June 25, Wu returned to the Tainan TSG GhostHawks of the T1 League. On December 9, Wu moved to the Yulon Luxgen Dinos of the Super Basketball League again due to player communication agreement.
