= Song Tao (basketball) =

Chinese basketball player and coach

Song Tao 宋涛
Personal information
- Born: November 6, 1965 (age 61) Qingdao, Shandong, China
- Listed height: 6 ft 10 in (2.08 m)
- Listed weight: 200 lb (91 kg)

Career information
- NBA draft: 1987: 3rd round, 67th overall pick
- Drafted by: Atlanta Hawks
- Playing career: 1985–2000
- Position: Forward

Career history
- 1995: Yulon Dinos
- 1995–1996: LUCKIPar
- 1996–1999: Yulon Dinos
- 1999–2000: BCC Mars
- Stats at Basketball Reference

Song Tao (Chinese: 宋涛; born November 6, 1965) is a Chinese former basketball player and coach. 6 ft 10 in (208 cm) with impressive mobility, he was the first player from Asia drafted by an NBA team when the Atlanta Hawks selected him in the 3rd round of the 1987 NBA draft, although he never went to training camp due to serious knee injuries.

Song competed at 1988 Seoul Olympic Games and was the flag bearer of the Chinese Olympic team. He retired from China men's national basketball team in 1991 and became a player-coach in the Shandong provincial team. In 1993, Song went to study in San Francisco, California and then moved to Taiwan to compete in the professional Chinese Basketball Alliance until he retired there around the turn of the century. He coached the National Chiao Tung University varsity team in the ensuing years.

Song returned to China in 2003, and has since lived in Suzhou, Jiangsu where he became a businessman.

== Family ==
His wife Peng Ping is also a former basketball player. She was a member of the China women's national basketball team that won the 1992 Olympic silver medals in basketball in Barcelona, Spain.
