= Noel Felix =

Belizean-American basketball player (born 1981)

Personal information
- Born: October 4, 1981 (age 45) Los Angeles, California, U.S.
- Listed height: 6 ft 9 in (2.06 m)
- Listed weight: 225 lb (102 kg)

Career information
- High school: Inglewood (Inglewood, California)
- College: Fresno State (1999–2003)
- NBA draft: 2003: undrafted
- Playing career: 2003–2015
- Position: Power forward / small forward
- Number: 16

Career history
- 2003–2004: Shanghai Sharks
- 2004: Idaho Stampede
- 2004: Carife Ferrara
- 2004–2005: Yakima Sun Kings
- 2005–2006: Sioux Falls Skyforce
- 2006: Seattle SuperSonics
- 2006–2007: Maccabi Tel Aviv
- 2007: Anaheim Arsenal
- 2007–2008: Hapoel Jerusalem
- 2008–2009: Anaheim Arsenal
- 2009–2010: Maine Red Claws
- 2010: Springfield Armor
- 2010–2011: Seoul Samsung Thunders
- 2011–2012: Dacin Tigers
- 2012–2013: Taiwan Mobile Clouded Leopards
- 2013: Guaiqueríes de Margarita
- 2013–2014: Alexandria Sporting Club
- 2014: Qatar SC
- 2014–2015: Sitra Club
- 2015: Caciques de Humacao

Career highlights
- All-CBA First Team (2006); CBA Defensive Player of the Year (2006); 2× CBA All-Defensive Team (2005, 2006); CBA blocks leader (2006)
- Stats at NBA.com
- Stats at Basketball Reference

Noel Gregory Felix (born October 4, 1981) is a former Belizean-American professional basketball player born in Los Angeles, California.

A 6'9", 225 lb. forward-center from Fresno State, Felix was the Continental Basketball Association (CBA) Defensive Player of the Year and earned All-CBA First Team honors in the 2005–06 season, playing for the Sioux Falls Skyforce.

Felix signed a 10-day contract with the Sonics as an undrafted free agent on March 2, 2006. At the end of that month, he was signed for the remainder of the season, appearing in a total of 12 games and averaging 1.5 ppg. In October 2006, Felix was waived by the Sonics. Later that month he signed a two-year contract with Israel's Maccabi Tel Aviv.

Felix started the 2007–08 season playing in the NBA Development League playing for the Anaheim Arsenal but in December 2007 signed with Hapoel Jerusalem.

In 2010, Felix spent time with the Springfield Armor and Maine Red Claws of the NBA Development League.

In 2011, Felix joined the Dacin Tigers of the Super Basketball League.
