= Garret Siler =

American basketball player (born 1986)

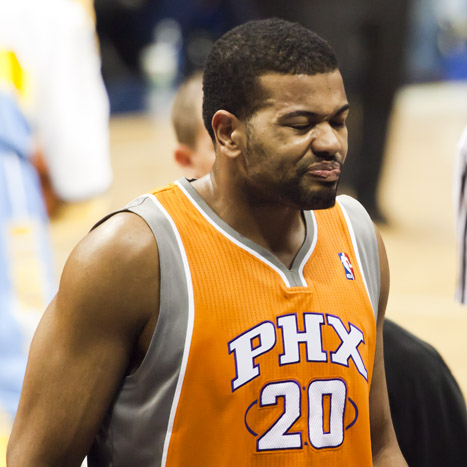
- Siler with the Phoenix Suns in 2011

Personal information
- Born: October 25, 1986 (age 40) Augusta, Georgia, U.S.
- Listed height: 6 ft 11 in (2.11 m)
- Listed weight: 305 lb (138 kg)

Career information
- High school: Academy of Richmond County (Augusta, Georgia)
- College: Augusta (2005–2009)
- NBA draft: 2009: undrafted
- Playing career: 2009–2020
- Position: Center
- Number: 20

Career history
- 2009–2010: Shanghai Xiyang Sharks
- 2010–2012: Phoenix Suns
- 2011: →Iowa Energy
- 2012–2014: Jiangsu Dragons
- 2013–2014: Leones de Ponce
- 2014: Capitanes de Arecibo
- 2015: Pure-Youth Construction
- 2015–2016: Marinos de Anzoategui
- 2017–2018: Fubon Braves
- 2018: Leones de Riobamba
- 2019: Kinmen Kaoliang Liquor
- 2019: Guaiqueríes de Margarita
- 2019: Soles de Santo Domingo Este
- 2019–2020: Yulon Luxgen Dinos

Career highlights
- Taiwanese Championship Series MVP (2015); CBA Slam Dunk leader (2013)
- Stats at NBA.com
- Stats at Basketball Reference

Garret Andrew Siler (born October 25, 1986) is an American former professional basketball player. He formerly played center for Augusta State University (now Augusta University). When he went undrafted in the 2009 NBA draft, he first signed with the D-League's Utah Flash and then the Chinese Basketball Association's Shanghai Sharks. During his one year with the Sharks, he averaged 14.3 points and 9.3 rebounds per game on 74 percent shooting from the field.

During the summer of 2010, he played for the New Jersey Nets in the Orlando portion of the NBA Summer League and for the Miami Heat in the Las Vegas portion. For Miami, he averaged 6.6 points, 3.8 rebounds, and 0.6 blocks while playing for 14 minutes per game for five games and shooting 75 percent from the field. On September 20, Siler was invited to practice for the Phoenix Suns. One day later, the Suns decided to give him a two-year contract for the NBA's minimum salary. On January 2, 2011, the Phoenix Suns assigned Garret to the Iowa Energy for 10 games. He was later called back up to Phoenix. The Suns implemented a weight clause for Siler. On January 2, 2012, after a win against the Golden State Warriors, the Suns announced that they waived Garret Siler. Siler was the first player from Augusta University (Georgia) to ever play for an NBA team. He also has the distinction of being the only John S. Davidson Fine Arts Magnet School student to play for a major professional sports team.

In 2012, he was named to the Washington Wizards's 2012 NBA Summer League team. He then played for the Jiangsu Dragons in the CBA. In 2013, he joined the Leones de Ponce in Puerto Rico. He was waived midseason.

After taking a year off, Siler would end up playing for the Pure-Youth Construction Basketball Team in Taiwan sometime in 2015. During this time, Siler would end up helping the team get their fourth straight championship, as well as earn Championship Series MVP honors during the final matches of the season.

On May 16, he signed with Marinos de Anzoátegui of the Venezuelan Liga Profesional de Baloncesto.

== NCAA career statistics ==
Legend
GP	Games played	GS	Games started	MPG	Minutes per game
FG%	Field goal percentage	3P%	3-point field goal percentage	FT%	Free throw percentage
RPG	Rebounds per game	APG	Assists per game	SPG	Steals per game
BPG	Blocks per game	PPG	Points per game	**Bold**	Career high

Year	Team	GP	GS	MPG	FG%	3P%	FT%	RPG	APG	SPG	BPG	PPG
2005–06	Augusta State	21	7	9.2	.699	.000	.409	2.4	0.19	0.05	0.57	5.3
2006–07	Augusta State	31	31	22.6	.689	.000	**.603**	6.8	0.77	**0.45**	2.39	13.1
2007–08	Augusta State	34	33	26.6	.762	.000	.579	**7.8**	**1.18**	0.35	**2.62**	15.2
2008–09	Augusta State	**35**	**35**	**26.8**	**.789**	.000	.655	7.7	0.86	0.37	2.57	**16.2**
	**Career**	121	106	21.3	.735	.000	.562	6.2	0.75	0.31	2.04	12.5

== International career statistics ==
=== Chinese Basketball Association ===
SEASON	LEAGUE	TEAM	GP	MPG	FG%	3P%	FT%	RPG	APG	SPG	BPG	PPG
2009–10	CBA	Shanghai Sharks	38	23.2	.543	.000	.582	9.3	0.6	0.6	1.6	14.1
2012–13	CBA	Jiangsu Dragons	32	31.8	.728	.000	.631	11.2	1.1	0.9	2.3	18.3

== NBA career statistics ==
Year	Team	GP	GS	MPG	FG%	3P%	FT%	RPG	APG	SPG	BPG	PPG
2010–11	Phoenix	21	0	4.8	.548	.000	.500	1.3	.1	.0	.2	2.1
	**Career**	21	0	4.8	.548	.000	.500	1.3	.1	.0	.2	2.1

=== D-League career statistics ===
Year	Team	GP	GS	MPG	FG%	3P%	FT%	RPG	APG	SPG	BPG	PPG
2010–11	Iowa Energy	4	1	16.3	.583	.000	.500	5.0	.3	.0	.8	4.5
	**Career**	4	1	16.3	.583	.000	.500	5.0	.3	.0	.8	4.5
