= Patrick O'Bryant =

American basketball player (born 1986)

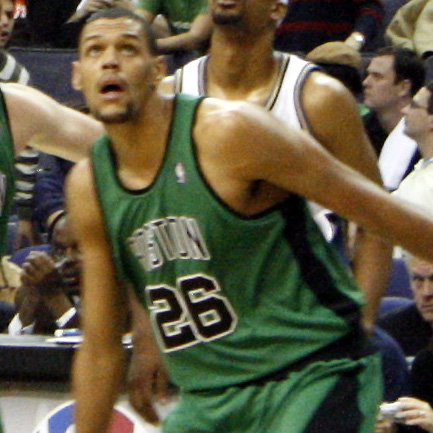
- O'Bryant with the Boston Celtics in 2008

Personal information
- Born: June 20, 1986 (age 40) Oskaloosa, Iowa, U.S.
- Listed height: 7 ft 0 in (2.13 m)
- Listed weight: 250 lb (113 kg)

Career information
- High school: Blaine (Blaine, Minnesota)
- College: Bradley (2004–2006)
- NBA draft: 2006: 1st round, 9th overall pick
- Drafted by: Golden State Warriors
- Playing career: 2006–2019
- Position: Center
- Number: 26, 13

Career history
- 2006–2008: Golden State Warriors
- 2006–2008: →Bakersfield Jam
- 2008–2009: Boston Celtics
- 2009–2010: Toronto Raptors
- 2011: Reno Bighorns
- 2011–2012: Kavala
- 2012: Indios de Mayagüez
- 2012: Tiburones de Vargas
- 2013: Reno Bighorns
- 2013: Lietuvos rytas
- 2013–2014: Taiwan Beer
- 2014: Atléticos de San Germán
- 2014–2015: Taiwan Beer
- 2015: GlobalPort Batang Pier
- 2015–2016: Taiwan Beer
- 2017: Fubon Braves
- 2018–2019: London Lightning

Career highlights
- BSN champion (2012); BSN Defensive Player of the Year (2012); SBL champion (2016); SBL Finals MVP (2016); SBL Best Foreign Player of the year (2014)
- Stats at NBA.com
- Stats at Basketball Reference

Patrick Fitzgerald O'Bryant (born June 20, 1986) is an American-Central African former professional basketball player. The 7 ft (213 cm), 250 lb (110 kg; 18 st) center was selected out of Bradley University by the Golden State Warriors with the 9th overall pick in the 2006 NBA draft. He has been a member of the NBA's Warriors, Boston Celtics, and Toronto Raptors, and has also played in the NBA Development League, and overseas in Europe and Latin America.

== College ==
O'Bryant attended Bradley University for two years and led the Braves to the Sweet Sixteen of the 2006 NCAA tournament before losing to University of Memphis. His breakout performance against traditional powerhouses Kansas and Pittsburgh at the tournament caught the eyes of NBA scouts. But in late 2005, O'Bryant, along with another student, was suspended for 8 games by the NCAA for receiving improper payments for work claimed he had undertaken in the summer, but had not actually done. All up he was paid $1,100 on a weekly basis, regardless of whether he showed up to work or not. On April 22, 2006, O'Bryant declared for the NBA draft, but did not hire an agent, making him eligible to return to college. However, O'Bryant made his declaration official the following month when he hired Andy Miller as his agent.

== Professional career ==
=== Golden State Warriors ===
On June 28, 2006, O'Bryant was selected by the Golden State Warriors with the 9th overall pick in the 2006 NBA draft. On September 6, he was diagnosed with a fracture in his right foot. He was placed in an immobilizing boot on the injured foot and missed six weeks of training camp. He played sparingly in the 2006–07 season.

O'Bryant became the first NBA lottery pick to be sent down to the Bakersfield Jam of the D-League on December 30, 2006. On February 19, 2007, he was recalled from the Jam. Warriors head coach Don Nelson had critical words for him: "I told him if he goes down to the D-League and isn't a dominant player, there should be red flags all over the place, and he should be the first to notice. He's not only not dominating, he's not playing very well. He's a long-term project. I really liked him the first week of training camp, but I assumed there would be great progress. [...] He hasn't gotten better one bit."

Prior to the 2007–08 season, the Warriors declined to pick up his third-year option, which made him an unrestricted free agent at the end of the season. On March 10, 2008, he was reassigned to the Bakersfield Jam; however, he was later recalled and rejoined the Warriors for the remainder of the season.

=== Boston Celtics ===
On July 11, 2008, O'Bryant signed a two-year, $3.12 million contract with the Boston Celtics. He had an impressive workout with the team a week earlier and was expected to be the backup center for Kendrick Perkins.

=== Toronto Raptors ===
On February 19, 2009, O'Bryant was traded by Boston to the Toronto Raptors in a 3-team deal with Will Solomon going to the Sacramento Kings, and a heavily protected future second-round pick going to the Celtics.

=== China ===
In September, 2010, O'Bryant signed a contract with Fujian Xunxing of the Chinese Basketball Association, but was later released because of poor performances in pre-season, as well as a reported lack of effort in practice.

=== Return to the NBA D-League ===
On January 10, 2011, O'Bryant joined the Reno Bighorns of the NBA Development League.

=== Europe ===
In August 2011 he signed with Kavala B.C.

=== Puerto Rico ===
In February 2012 he signed with the Indios de Mayagüez of Puerto Rico.

=== Return to Reno and Lietuvos Rytas ===
On January 16, 2013, O'Bryant was reacquired by the Reno Bighorns. He was bought out of his contract on January 30. He then joined Lietuvos rytas. Despite being signed as one of the team's main centers, his playing time decreased over the following months. O'Bryant was released on May 6, 2013.

=== Charlotte Bobcats ===
In September 2013, O'Bryant signed with the Charlotte Bobcats. However, he was waived on October 23.

=== Taiwan ===
In November 2013, O'Bryant signed with Taiwan Beer of the Super Basketball League. On April 24, 2016, O'Bryant won the Final's MVP award while playing for Taiwan Beer.

=== The BIG3 League ===
On May 5, 2018, O'Bryant signed on to play in the BIG3 League. He also coaches in Las Vegas with the private coaching service, CoachUp.

=== London Lightning ===
On October 27, 2018, O'Bryant signed with the London Lightning of the National Basketball League of Canada.

== National team career ==
O'Bryant holds a Central African passport, and has played with the senior Central African national team at the AfroBasket 2013 tournament, helping the team reach the playoff stage.

== SBL career statistics (Taiwan) ==
=== Regular season ===
Year	Team	GP	2P%	3P%	FT%	RPG	APG	BPG	PPG
2013–2014	Taiwan Beer	28	.462	.257	.713	13.7	1.8	2.4	20.3
2014–2015	Taiwan Beer	28	.469	.302	.669	13.7	2.2	1.6	19.8
2015–2016	Taiwan Beer	29	.408	.329	.678	13.5	3.0	1.8	17.3

=== Postseason ===
Year	Team	GP	2P%	3P%	FT%	RPG	APG	BPG	PPG
2013–2014	Taiwan Beer	7	.411	.200	.738	11.6	1.7	0.4	21.1
2014–2015	Taiwan Beer	14	.450	.165	.697	11.1	2.4	2.4	18.8
2015–2016	Taiwan Beer	11	.545	.436	.813	16.8	1.7	2.2	23.4

== NBA career statistics ==
Legend
GP	Games played	GS	Games started	MPG	Minutes per game
FG%	Field goal percentage	3P%	3-point field goal percentage	FT%	Free throw percentage
RPG	Rebounds per game	APG	Assists per game	SPG	Steals per game
BPG	Blocks per game	PPG	Points per game	**Bold**	Career high

=== Regular season ===
Year	Team	GP	GS	MPG	FG%	3P%	FT%	RPG	APG	SPG	BPG	PPG
2006–07	Golden State	16	0	7.4	.313	.000	.647	1.3	**.6**	**.4**	.5	1.9
2007–08	Golden State	24	0	4.1	**.552**	.000	.600	1.2	.2	.2	.4	1.5
2008–09	Boston	**26**	0	4.2	.516	.000	**.667**	1.3	.3	.1	.3	1.5
2008–09	Toronto	13	**3**	**11.3**	.547	.000	.375	**2.5**	.2	.2	**.8**	**4.7**
2009–10	Toronto	11	0	4.6	.533	.000	.500	1.0	.1	.2	.4	1.7
Career		90	3	5.8	.494	.000	.583	1.4	.3	.2	.4	2.1

== Playing style ==
O'Bryant was a late bloomer who was not heavily recruited out of high school. He plays the center position and is known for his shot-blocking ability, as he led the Missouri Valley Conference in blocks for two straight years, and is also a solid rebounder. He has a 7'6" wingspan. His offensive game also features a skyhook.
