= Yen Hsing-su =

Taiwanese basketball player and coach

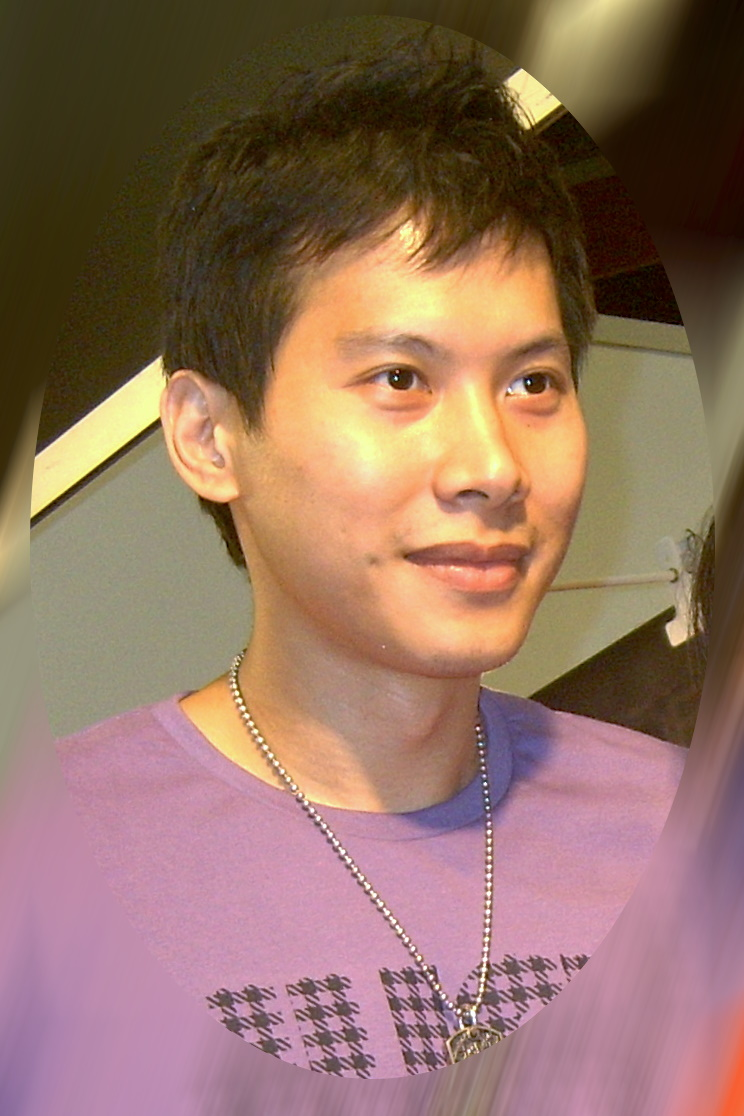
- Yen at the 2008 Leisure Taiwan Day in Taipei

Taiwan Beer Leopards
- Title: Chief operating officer
- League: Taiwan Professional Basketball League

Personal information
- Born: 8 September 1976 (age 50) Taipei County (now New Taipei City), Taiwan
- Listed height: 6 ft 0 in (1.83 m)
- Listed weight: 163 lb (74 kg)

Career information
- High school: Private Nanshan Senior High School (私立南山高級中學), Taipei County, Taiwan
- College: Fu Jen Catholic University
- Playing career: 1995–2010
- Position: Point guard

Career history

Playing
- 1995–2004: BCC Mars
- 1999–2002: ROC Armed Forces Training Team
- 2007–2008: Yunnan Bulls
- 2008–2009: Taiwan Beer
- 2009–2010: Shanghai Sharks

Coaching
- 2010–2011: Chinese Taipei U19 (assistant)
- 2011–2012: BYU–Hawaii (assistant)
- 2013–2015: NTSU (executive coach)
- 2014–2015: Taoyuan Pauian Archiland (assistant)
- 2015–2017: Taipei Fubon Braves
- 2018–present: Fu Jen Catholic University (assistant)
- 2019–present: Hon Yau (assistant)
- 2019–2022: Juang Jing High School
- 2020–2021: Taoyuan Pauian Archiland
- 2021–2022: Taoyuan Pauian Pilots (assistant)

Career highlights
- As executive: T1 League champion (2024); TPBL General Manager of the Year (2026); T1 League General Manager of the Year (2024)
Medals
Men's basketball
Representing Chinese Taipei
East Asian Games
Gold medal – first place	1997 Busan
Silver medal – second place	2001 Osaka

Yen Hsing-su
- Traditional Chinese: 顏行書
- Simplified Chinese: 颜行书
Transcriptions
Standard Mandarin
- Hanyu Pinyin: Yán Xíngshū
- Wade–Giles: Yen^{2} Hsing^{2}-shu^{1}

Yen Hsing-su (Chinese: 顏行書; born 8 September 1976), also known as Johnny Yen, is a Taiwanese basketball coach and former basketball player, singer and actor. Since 2017 he has been the assistant coach of the Chinese Taipei men's national basketball team. From 2015 to 2017 he coached the Fubon Braves in Taiwan's Super Basketball League.

Nicknamed "The Basketball Genie" (籃球精靈) for his playmaking skills, Yen was a regular of the Chinese Taipei national basketball team from 1997 to 2003. At the 2003 ABC Championship, he led the tournament in assists (4.7 per game), but retired soon afterwards to pursue a career in entertainment. In the years to follow, he led the boy band 183 Club and also starred in many popular TV dramas. He returned to professional basketball in 2007 and permanently retired in 2010. He has played professionally in both Taiwan (Chinese Basketball Alliance) and mainland China (Chinese Basketball Association).

== Basketball career ==
Yen was a high school star back in Private NanShan Senior High School and turned professional in 1995 with the Tera Mars (later Kaohsiung and BCC Mars) in the Chinese Basketball Alliance of Taiwan. As starting point guard, he led the league in assists for the 1997–1998 season and was then ranked among the best and brightest next-generation backcourt players in Taiwan. He was also selected to the Chinese Taipei senior basketball team from 1997 until 2003.

Around the start of the 21st century, however, Yen Hsing-su started to suffer from a succession of knee injuries. In his last appearance on the national team, Yen led the FIBA Asian Championship in assists, signifying his ability to continuously compete at Asia's highest level of basketball if free from injury. Yet, he decided to become a full-time entertainer after completing the first season (2003–2004) of the newly founded Super Basketball League (SBL). This was presumably due to the chronic knee problem and, arguably, the success of his new entertainment career following the airing of My MVP Valentine, a basketball-themed TV drama he starred in while healing the initial knee injury in 2002.

In 2007, Yen returned to basketball when he signed with Yunnan Bulls in the Chinese Basketball Association in mainland China to play in the 2007–2008 season. As a starter, he averaged 8.1 points and 5.2 assists (3rd in the league) in 22 games. After the season, he returned to Taiwan to play for Taiwan Beer in the SBL where he won his only club championship title. In the ensuing 2009–2010 season, Yen once again joined the Chinese professional league to play for the Shanghai Sharks.

Currently, Yen is an assistant coach in Brigham Young University–Hawaii and a sports commentator at FOX Sports Taiwan.

On July 5, 2023, Yen was named as the chief operating officer of the TaiwanBeer Leopards. On May 16, 2024, Yen awarded the T1 League General Manager of the Year in 2023–24 season. On June 10, 2026, Yen awarded the TPBL General Manager of the Year in 2025–26 season. On July 8, Yen re-signed with the Taoyuan Taiwan Beer Leopards of the Taiwan Professional Basketball League.

== Filmography (TV Dramas) ==
Year	English title	Chinese title	Role	Notes
2002	My MVP Valentine	MVP情人	Duan Chen-feng	
2004	Snow Angel	雪天使	Chi Hsing-feng	
2004	The Champion	任我遨遊	Wu Zhen Kang	
2005	The Prince Who Turns into a Frog	王子變青蛙	Hsieh Chuan	
2006	Legend of Star Apple	星蘋果樂園	Lu Tien-hao	
2020	Fly the Jumper	違反校規的跳投	Coach Wei Li	

=== Reality show ===
Year	Title	Chinese title	Note	Ref.
2018	Super Penguin League; Season:1	超级企鹅联盟super3	Player; Live Basketball Competition	
