= Zhang Xuelei =

Chinese basketball player (1963–2024)

Zhang Xuelei 张学雷
Personal information
- Born: 13 May 1963 (age 63) Shenyang, Liaoning, China
- Died: 21 June 2024 Taipei, Taiwan
- Listed height: 6.7 ft 0 in (2.04 m)

Career information
- Playing career: 1984–1999
- Position: Shooting guard / point guard

Career history

Coaching
- 2005–2008: Yulon Luxgen Dinos
- 2008–2014: Yulon Luxgen Dinos （chief coach)
- 2010: Chinese Taipei （chief coach)
Medals
Men's basketball
Representing China
FIBA Asia Cup
Bronze medal – third place	1985 Kuala Lumpur
Gold medal – first place	1987 Bangkok

Zhang Xuelei (Chinese: 張學雷 or 张学雷; 13 May 1963 – 21 June 2024) was a Chinese basketball player who competed in the 1988 Summer Olympics. Zhang died on 21 June 2024, at the age of 61.
