= Changhua Pauian BLL =

- Leagues: Super Basketball League
- Founded: 15 July 2022; 4 years ago
- Folded: 2026
- History: Changhua BLL; 2023–2024; Changhua Pauian BLL; 2025–2026
- Location: Changhua, Taiwan
- President: Huang Chin-Chang
- General manager: Chen Hung-Chi
- Head coach: Wu Chun-Hsiung
- Ownership: Changhua Basketball Committee; Taiwan Bor-Chuann
- Championships: 0

Changhua Pauian BLL (Chinese: 彰化璞園柏力力) was a professional basketball team based in Changhua, Taiwan. They had been part of the Super Basketball League since 2023.

== History ==
On July 11, 2022, the Taoyuan Pauian Archiland announced that they will rent their playing spot in the Super Basketball League to the Changhua Basketball Committee for the following two seasons. They also took over the remaining contracts of the Taoyuan Pauian Archiland players. On July 15, the team announced the team name Changhua BLL. The team selected Chiang Shang-Chien with the first overall pick of the 2022 SBL draft, making Chiang the first UBA Division II player ever to be selected by the first overall pick in SBL draft history.

On August 17, 2026, the news reported that the Changhua Pauian BLL was folded.

== Last roster ==
Changhua Pauian BLL roster
Players
Coaches

Pos.	No.	Nat.	Name	Ht.	Wt.	Age	From
F	0	(Taiwan)	Chang Wei-Hsiang	1.90 m (6 ft 3 in)	91 kg (201 lb)	30 – 15 May 1996	NTUA
G	5	(Taiwan)	Lin Li	1.81 m (5 ft 11 in)	78 kg (172 lb)	25 – 20 June 2001	NCCU
G	6	(Taiwan)	Huang Chun-Yen	1.82 m (6 ft 0 in)	75 kg (165 lb)	23 – 14 April 2003	NTUA
G	7	(Taiwan)	Chiang Shang-Chien	1.81 m (5 ft 11 in)	75 kg (165 lb)	27 – 23 October 1999	AU
PF/C	8	(Nigeria)	Ifeanyi Eboka (FS)	1.98 m (6 ft 6 in)	104 kg (229 lb)	26 – 29 June 2000	SHU
G	10	(Taiwan)	Hsu Yu-Hui	1.83 m (6 ft 0 in)	89 kg (196 lb)	25 – 13 October 2001	NTSU
F	11	(Taiwan)	Chen Zhao-Qun	1.96 m (6 ft 5 in)	77 kg (170 lb)	26 – 10 November 2000	NTUST
SF	13	(Taiwan)	Huang Chien-Chih	1.87 m (6 ft 2 in)	90 kg (198 lb)	28 – 8 September 1998	NTNU
C	15	(Taiwan)	Yen Tsung-Wei	1.98 m (6 ft 6 in)	110 kg (243 lb)	25 – 6 March 2001	NTUST
G	19	(Taiwan)	Yang Tien-You	1.70 m (5 ft 7 in)	72 kg (159 lb)	33 – 24 September 1993	UKN
G	24	(Taiwan)	Tsai Houng-Yang	1.81 m (5 ft 11 in)	83 kg (183 lb)	26 – 13 September 2000	FJU
F	34	(Taiwan)	Wang Jia-Chang	1.91 m (6 ft 3 in)	88 kg (194 lb)	25 – 6 November 2001	NTNU
F	39	(Taiwan)	Huang Wei-Cheng	1.92 m (6 ft 4 in)	86 kg (190 lb)	23 – 6 May 2003	NTSU
C	45	(United States)	Nick Evans (I)	2.10 m (6 ft 11 in)	113 kg (249 lb)	38 – 14 April 1988	Southern Illinois
G	77	(Taiwan)	Liu Cheng-Yen	1.73 m (5 ft 8 in)	77 kg (170 lb)	25 – 8 July 2001	ISU
G	88	(Taiwan)	Zhou Cheng-Rui	1.94 m (6 ft 4 in)	84 kg (185 lb)	26 – 24 February 2000	CCU

Head coach

- (Taiwan) Wu Chun-Hsiung

Strength & conditioning coach(es)

- (Taiwan) Shih Ching-Heng

Legend

- (C) Team captain
- (I) Import player
- (FS) Foreign student player
- Injured

- Roster
Updated: 2026-04-03

== Head coaches ==
#	Name	Term	GC	W	L	Win%	GC	W	L	Win%	Achievements
#	Name	Term	Regular season				Playoffs				Achievements
Changhua BLL
1	Wu Chun-Hsiung	2023–2024	60	20	40	.333	–	–	–	–	
Changhua Pauian BLL
–	Wu Chun-Hsiung	2025–2026	58	20	38	.345	–	–	–	–	

== Season-by-season record ==
Super Basketball League
Season	Coach	Regular season				Postseason			
Season	Coach	Won	Lost	Win %	Finish	Won	Lost	Win %	Result
2023	Wu Chun-Hsiung	11	19	.367	4th	Did not qualify.			
2024	Wu Chun-Hsiung	9	21	.300	4th	Did not qualify.			
2025	Wu Chun-Hsiung	12	18	.400	4th	Did not qualify.			
2026	Wu Chun-Hsiung	8	20	.286	5th	Did not qualify.			
Totals		40	78	.339	-	0	0	–	0 Playoff Appearances
