= Bank of Taiwan (basketball) =

Taiwanese basketball team

Bank of Taiwan 臺灣銀行
- League: SBL
- Founded: 1973
- Location: Taipei, Taiwan
- Head coach: Chen Kuo-Wei
- Championships: 1 (SBL)

Bank of Taiwan is a Taiwanese professional basketball team that plays in the Super Basketball League. The team was established in 1973 by the Bank of Taiwan, and later joined the SBL in 2003.

== SBL regular season records ==
- 2003–2004 season: 7th place
- 2004–2005 season: 6th place
- 2005–2006 season: 4th place
- 2006–2007 season: 7th place
- 2007–2008 season: 7th place
- 2008–2009 season: 7th place
- 2009–2010 season: 7th place
- 2010–2011 season: 5th place
- 2011–2012 season: 7th place
- 2012–2013 season: 5th place
- 2013–2014 season: 7th place
- 2014–2015 season: 5th place
- 2015–2016 season: 6th place
- 2016–2017 season: 7th place
- 2017–2018 season: 7th place
- 2018–2019 season: 7th place
- 2019–2020 season: 4th place
- 2020–2021 season: 3rd place
- 2021–2022 season: 1st place
- 2022–2023 season: 2nd place
- 2023–2024 season: 2nd place
- 2024–2025 season: 3rd place
- 2025–2026 season: 2nd place

== Championships ==
2021–2022

- Champions: Bank of Taiwan
- Runners-up: Taiwan Beer

== Current roster ==
Bank of Taiwan roster
Players
Coaches

| Pos. | No. | Nat. | Name | Ht. | Wt. | Age | From |
|---|---|---|---|---|---|---|---|
| SF | 0 | (Taiwan) | Lee Yun-Chieh | 1.88 m (6 ft 2 in) | 83 kg (183 lb) | 26 – 21 August 2000 | NCCU |
| G | 2 | (Taiwan) | Kuo Chen-Fu | 1.92 m (6 ft 4 in) | 86 kg (190 lb) | 25 – 22 February 2001 | NKNU |
| C | 3 | (The Bahamas) | Jaydian Smith (FS) | 2.05 m (6 ft 9 in) | 98 kg (216 lb) | 24 – 31 July 2002 | UCH |
| G | 7 | (Taiwan) | Wang Wei-Cheng | 1.83 m (6 ft 0 in) | 75 kg (165 lb) | 27 – 7 August 1999 | NKNU |
| G | 8 | (Taiwan) | Lin Jhe-Ting | 1.83 m (6 ft 0 in) | 72 kg (159 lb) | 27 – 8 September 1999 | FJU |
| G | 10 | (Taiwan) | Wang Yu-Feng | 1.78 m (5 ft 10 in) | 73 kg (161 lb) | 23 – 23 September 2003 | NKNU |
| F | 11 | (Taiwan) | Pan Hsiang-Wei | 1.90 m (6 ft 3 in) | 83 kg (183 lb) | 32 – 26 October 1994 | ISU |
| F | 12 | (Taiwan) | Chang Chia-He | 1.88 m (6 ft 2 in) | 85 kg (187 lb) | 29 – 15 December 1996 | NTUA |
| F | 13 | (Taiwan) | Chiang Chi-En | 1.94 m (6 ft 4 in) | 90 kg (198 lb) | 23 – 2 June 2003 | NTUST |
| C | 14 | (Taiwan) | Kuo Han | 1.95 m (6 ft 5 in) | 110 kg (243 lb) | 28 – 28 August 1998 | NTSU |
| G | 17 | (Taiwan) | Wang Tai-Chieh | 1.81 m (5 ft 11 in) | 86 kg (190 lb) | 33 – 17 November 1992 | NTNU |
| F | 22 | (Taiwan) | Lin Jyun-Hao | 1.93 m (6 ft 4 in) | 90 kg (198 lb) | 28 – 19 January 1998 | NTUA |
| G | 24 | (Taiwan) | Kao Chien-Yi | 1.85 m (6 ft 1 in) | 85 kg (187 lb) | 36 – 10 June 1990 | ISU |
| G | 25 | (Taiwan) | Wang Shu-Fu | 1.80 m (5 ft 11 in) | 72 kg (159 lb) | 26 – 6 May 2000 | CTBC |
| F | 27 | (Taiwan) | Cao Li-Zhong | 1.90 m (6 ft 3 in) | 95 kg (209 lb) | 27 – 28 August 1999 | NKNU |
| F | 29 | (Taiwan) | Wang Yung-Cheng | 1.96 m (6 ft 5 in) | 95 kg (209 lb) | 27 – 29 December 1998 | NCCU |
| G | 34 | (Taiwan) | Hsu Yu-Hui | 1.83 m (6 ft 0 in) | 89 kg (196 lb) | 25 – 13 October 2001 | NTSU |
| F | 37 | (Taiwan) | Han Chieh-Yu | 1.94 m (6 ft 4 in) | 94 kg (207 lb) | 26 – 17 December 1999 | NTSU |
| PF/C | 42 | (New Zealand) | Dan Fotu (I) | 2.01 m (6 ft 7 in) | 101 kg (223 lb) | 27 – 24 July 1999 | Saint Mary's |
| F | 43 | (Taiwan) | Wang Jia-Chang | 1.91 m (6 ft 3 in) | 91 kg (201 lb) | 24 – 6 November 2001 | NTNU |

Head coach

- (Taiwan) Chen Kuo-Wei

Assistant coach(es)

- (Taiwan) Cheng En-Chieh
- (Taiwan) Hsu Chih-Chiang
- (Taiwan) Chen Yu-Chih
- (Taiwan) Sang Yi-Ching
- (Taiwan) Chou Ben-Tang

Athletic trainer(s)

- (Taiwan) Lee Chien-Hung

Team manager

- (Taiwan) Chou Ben-Tang

Legend

- (C) Team captain
- (I) Import player
- (FS) Foreign student player
- Injured

- Roster
Updated: 2026-11-03

== Notable players ==
Note: Flags indicate national team eligibility at FIBA-sanctioned events. Players may hold other non-FIBA nationalities not displayed.

Criteria

To appear in this section a player must have either:

- Set a club record or won an individual award while at the club
- Played at least one official international match for their national team at any time
- Played at least one official NBA match at any time.

- Chang Jung-Hsuan
- Chen Hsin-An
- Chen Shun-Hsiang
- Chieng Li-Huan
- Chou Po-Hsun
- Douglas Creighton
- Hsu Hao-Cheng
- Lin Chih-Wei
- Greg Smith
- Su Shih-Hsuan
- Wu Feng-Cheng
- Wu Yung-Jen
- Yang Chin-Min
- Yueh Ying-Li

== Head coaches ==
| # | Name | Term | GC | W | L | Win% | GC | W | L | Win% | Achievements |
| # | Name | Term | Regular season | | | | Playoffs | | | | Achievements |
|---|---|---|---|---|---|---|---|---|---|---|---|
Bank of Taiwan
| 1 | Wei Chen-Ming | 2003–2007 | 114 | 33 | 81 | .289 | 7 | 1 | 6 | .143 | 2005–06 SBL Coach of the Year |
| 2 | Lai Liang-Chung | 2007–2012 | 150 | 33 | 117 | .220 | – | – | – | – | |
| – | Wei Chen-Ming | 2012–2014 | 60 | 17 | 43 | .283 | – | – | – | – | |
| 3 | Hong Chun-Cheng | 2014–2016 | 60 | 25 | 35 | .417 | 4 | 0 | 4 | .000 | |
| 4 | Hsu Chih-Chao | 2016–2017 | 30 | 7 | 23 | .233 | – | – | – | – | |
| – | Wei Chen-Ming | 2017–2019 | 66 | 18 | 48 | .273 | – | – | – | – | |
| 5 | Chen Kuo-Wei | 2019–2023 | 132 | 68 | 65 | .511 | 9 | 3 | 6 | .333 | 2021–22 SBL Coach of the Year; 1 SBL championship (2022) |
| 6 | Cheng En-Chieh | 2024–2026 | 88 | 48 | 40 | .545 | 11 | 4 | 7 | .364 | |
| – | Chen Kuo-Wei | 2026–present | 0 | 0 | 0 | – | – | – | – | – | |

== Retired numbers ==
Bank of Taiwan retired numbers
| No. | Player | Position | Tenure | Ceremony date |
|---|---|---|---|---|
| 1 | Chien Ming-Fu | G | 2003–2009; 2012–2014 | March 8, 2014 |
| 6 | Chen Shun-Hsiang | F | 2005–2020 | November 28, 2020 |
