= Cheng Chih-lung (basketball) =

Taiwanese basketball coach and player

Cheng Chih-lung (鄭志龍)
Personal information
- Born: 29 August 1969 (age 57) Taipei County (now New Taipei City), Taiwan
- Listed height: 6 ft 3 in (1.91 m)
- Listed weight: 191 lb (87 kg)

Career information
- High school: Jing Wen High School (景文高中), Taipei, Taiwan
- College: Chinese Culture University
- Playing career: 1989–2001
- Position: Small forward, shooting guard
- Coaching career: 2007–present

Career history

Playing
- 1986–1988: Taiwan Tobacco and Wine Monopoly Bureau Golden Dragons (公賣金龍籃球隊)
- 1989–1991: Flying Camel Basketball Team (飛駝籃球隊)
- 1991–1992: McDonald's Basketball Team (麥當勞籃球隊)
- 1992–1999: Hung Kuo Elephants (宏國象隊)
- 1999–2000: Shanghai Sharks
- 2000–2001: Dacin Tigers

Coaching
- 2007–2011: Taiwan Mobile Clouded Leopards
- 2012: Jiangsu Dragons
- 2013–2014: Taiwan Mobile
- 2014–2015: Qingdao Eagles (assistant)
- 2015–2017: Xinjiang Flying Tigers (assistant)
- 2017–2018: Shanghai Swordfish
- 2018–2020: Shanghai Sharks (assistant)
- 2021–2022: Taoyuan Pauian Pilots
- 2023: Kaohsiung 17LIVE Steelers
- 2026–present: Suke Lions
Medals
Men's basketball
Representing Chinese Taipei
FIBA Asia Cup
Bronze medal – third place	1989 Beijing
East Asian Games
Gold medal – first place	1997 Busan
ABC Under-18 Championship
Bronze medal – third place	1986 Manila
Silver medal – second place	1989 Manila

Cheng Chih-lung (born 29 August 1969) is a Taiwanese basketball coach and retired basketball player, as well as a former politician as a member of the Legislative Yuan of the Republic of China.

Cheng played small forward for the Chinese Taipei national basketball team and started as shooting guard for his professional clubs in Taiwan's Chinese Basketball Alliance and mainland China's Chinese Basketball Association mostly in the last decade of the 20th century. During his prime, he was widely recognized as one of the best offensive players in Asia. He was also the first Taiwanese player to play in the Chinese Basketball Association. After a brief but controversy-packed political career following his retirement as a player in 2001, Cheng has returned to basketball to coach in Taiwan's Super Basketball League since 2007. (He also coached in China's National Basketball League in 2012.)

== Early life ==
Cheng's biological father returned to the United States before Cheng was born. He was raised by his mother, of Amis descent.

== Playing career ==
As a member of the Chinese Taipei youth team, teen-aged Cheng Chih-lung was two-time scoring champion in the FIBA's Under-18 Asian Championship. At the age of 19, he became the then-youngest player on the Chinese Taipei adult team and helped his team to a third-place finish in FIBA Asia Championship 1989—Taiwan's best record in the tournament since its resumption of international sports participation in the mid-1980s. From then through 1999, Cheng played for the national team in various international tournaments and helped set the team's best records in all major tournaments in the region including winning Taiwan's first gold medal in men's basketball in the 1997 East Asian Games. As the representative star player of Taiwan, Cheng was selected to All-Tournament Team for the William Jones Cup international tournament for numerous times and to the FIBA Asian All-Star roster in 1998.

Initially nicknamed "Doctor" after Dr. J by his American coach, John Nealon, due to his jumping ability, Cheng Chih-lung subsequently derived another nickname, "the Loach-Dragon" (泥鰍龍), from his shrewd playing style. A stable mid- and long range shooter, Cheng was also acclaimed for his smart offensive running, crafty moves, and great body coordination in the air that enabled him to "bore" through the defense like a slippery dojo loach and score from various angles and distances. As a Hung Kuo Elephant, he became the then-highest-paid basketball player in Taiwan and was the cornerstone of the "Hung Kuo dynasty" from 1996 through 1998 when the team won three consecutive championships of Taiwan's professional Chinese Basketball Alliance (中華職業籃球聯盟). He was named the most valuable player (MVP) for the 1995–1996 season and for the 1998 championship series where he almost single-handedly brought his team to its third title out of a 1-3 plight in the best-of-seven series against the powerful challenger, the Kaohsiung Mars.

After the Taiwanese professional league, as well as his home club, the Hung Kuo Elephants, came to disbandment due to financial difficulties in 1999, Cheng moved to play for the Shanghai Sharks of the Chinese Basketball Association in mainland China. Teamed up with the then-adolescent Yao Ming, Cheng helped the young Sharks advance to the finals for the first time in franchise history before they were defeated by the nearly invincible Bayi Rockets. First Taiwanese player to join the top-tier Chinese league, Cheng was selected to play in the postseason all-star game and received the league's sporting ethics award. After one rather successful season in China, Cheng returned to Taiwan to play for Dacin Tigers in the amateur Division-A conference (甲組聯賽) where he ended his playing career in the following year (2001).

== After retirement as a player ==
Under the arrangement of his sponsor Wang Jen-ta (王人達), the then-president of the executive board of the Republic of China Basketball Association (中華民國籃球協會) and a political ally of James Soong, Cheng Chih-lung ran for and won the 2001 legislative election as the People First Party (PFP) nominee in the first district of Taipei County. His political career, however, was overshadowed by the scandal of extramarital affair with legislative colleague Kao Chin Su-mei, and public censures for inaction.

In the capacity of legislator, nevertheless, Cheng Chih-lung was given the credit of working with the government's Sports Affairs Council to give birth to the Super Basketball League, which started to function in 2003. In the fifth season of the league's existence, Cheng Chih-lung accepted the commission to coach Taiwan Mobile Clouded Leopards and brought the losing team to an improved 15–15 record in the 2009–2010 season.
