= Super Basketball League =

Semi-professional men's basketball league in Taiwan

Super Basketball League (SBL) 超級籃球聯賽 (SBL)
- Current season, competition or edition: 2027 Super Basketball League
- Sport: Basketball
- Founded: 2003
- No. of teams: 4
- Country: Taiwan
- Continent: FIBA Asia (Asia)
- Most recent champion: Yulon (9th title)
- Most titles: Yulon (9 titles)
- Level on pyramid: 2
- Website: SBL (in Chinese)

The Super Basketball League (Chinese: 超級籃球聯賽), often abbreviated as the SBL, is a men's semi-pro basketball league in Taiwan.

== Teams ==
=== Current teams ===
- Bank of Taiwan (臺灣銀行)
- Caesar Keelung Black Kites (凱撒基隆黑鳶)
- Taiwan Beer (台灣啤酒)
- Yulon (裕隆集團)

=== Former teams ===
- Changhua Pauian BLL (彰化璞園柏力力) – dissolved in August 2026
- Dacin Tigers (達欣工程) – now competes in amateur competitions
- Fubon Braves (富邦勇士) – now competes in the P. League+ (PLG)
- Kaohsiung Jeoutai Technology (高雄九太科技) – dissolved on May 30, 2022
- Taoyuan Pauian Archiland (桃園璞園建築) – playing spot on loan to Changhua Pauian BLL

=== Timeline ===
Current team Former team

== Champions ==
Champions and other postseason standings are listed below:

Season	Champions	Runners-up	Third place	Fourth place
2003–04	Yulon Dinos	Sina Lions		
2004–05	Yulon Dinos	Dacin Tigers		
2005–06	Yulon Dinos	Taiwan Beer	Dacin Tigers	Bank of Taiwan
2006–07	Taiwan Beer	Dacin Tigers	Videoland Hunters	Yulon Dinos
2007–08	Taiwan Beer	Yulon Dinos		
2008–09	Dacin Tigers	Taiwan Beer		
2010	Yulon Luxgen Dinos	Dacin Tigers		
2010–11	Taiwan Beer	Dacin Tigers		
2011–12	Pauian Archiland	Dacin Tigers		
2012–13	Pauian Archiland	Dacin Tigers		
2013–14	Pauian Archiland	Taiwan Mobile Clouded Leopards		
2014–15	Pauian Archiland	Taiwan Beer		
2015–16	Taiwan Beer	Pauian Archiland		
2016–17	Dacin Tigers	Yulon Luxgen Dinos		
2017–18	Taoyuan Pauian Archiland	Fubon Braves		
2018–19	Fubon Braves	Taiwan Beer		
2019–20	Taiwan Beer	Yulon Luxgen Dinos		
2020–21	Taiwan Beer; Yulon Luxgen Dinos	No finals played		
2021–22	Bank of Taiwan	Taiwan Beer		
2023	Yulon Luxgen Dinos	Bank of Taiwan		
2024	Yulon Luxgen Dinos	Taiwan Beer		
2025	Yulon	Bank of Taiwan		
2026	Yulon	Caesar Keelung Black Kites		

=== Finals appearances ===
This is a list of the teams which have advanced to the SBL Finals and the overall win–loss records they have registered in the Championship Series.

Total	Team	Title(s)	Runners-up	Pct.	Notes
12	Yulon	9	3	.750	Won four league titles in a row from 2023 to 2026. Titles included the cancelled 2021 finals (declared co-champions).
12	Taiwan Beer	6	6	.500	Made four consecutive finals appearances from 2005–06 to 2008–09. Titles included the cancelled 2021 finals (declared co-champions).
8	Dacin Tigers	2	6	.250	Made five consecutive finals appearances from 2008–09 to 2012–13.
7	Taoyuan Pauian Archiland	5	2	.714	Won four league titles in a row from 2011–12 to 2014–15.
3	Fubon Braves	1	2	.333	Won first title in 2018–19.
3	Bank of Taiwan	1	2	.333	Won first title in 2021–22.
1	Caesar Keelung Black Kites	0	1	.000	Made a finals appearance in its debut season.

== League MVP ==
The winner of the Super Basketball League Most Valuable Player (MVP) award is chosen by reporters. The recipients of the award are listed below:

Season	Regular season MVP	Championship Series MVP
2003–2004	Tien Lei (田壘) Dacin Tigers	Chen Hsin-an (陳信安) Yulon Dinos
2004–2005	Tien Lei (田壘) Dacin Tigers	Tseng Wen-ting (曾文鼎) Yulon Dinos
2005–2006	Tien Lei (田壘) Dacin Tigers	Tseng Wen-ting (曾文鼎) Yulon Dinos
2006–2007	Lin Chih-chieh (林志傑) Taiwan Beer	Lin Chih-chieh (林志傑) Taiwan Beer
2007–2008	Chen Hsin-an (陳信安) Yulon Dinos	Lin Chih-chieh (林志傑) Taiwan Beer
2008–2009	Chang Chih-feng (張智峰) Dacin Tigers	Chang Chih-feng (張智峰) Dacin Tigers
2009–2010	Tseng Wen-ting (曾文鼎) Yulon Dinos	Chen Chih-chung (陳志忠) Yulon Dinos
2010–2011	Rashad Jennings Pure-Youth	Yang Chin-min (楊敬敏) Taiwan Beer
2011–2012	Quincy Davis Pauian	Chen Shih-chieh (陳世杰) Pauian
2012–2013	Tsai Wen-cheng (蔡文誠) Pauian	Tsai Wen-cheng (蔡文誠) Pauian
2013–2014	Liu Cheng (劉錚) Taiwan Beer	Tsai Wen-cheng (蔡文誠) Pauian
2014–2015	Chen Shun-hsiang (陳順詳) Bank of Taiwan	Garret Siler Pauian
2015–2016	Chou Yi-hsiang (周儀翔) Dacin Tigers	Patrick O'Bryant Taiwan Beer
2016–2017	Chou Yi-hsiang (周儀翔) Dacin Tigers	Su I-chieh (蘇翊傑) Dacin Tigers
2017–2018	Lu Cheng-ju (呂政儒) Yulon Dinos	Quincy Davis Pauian
2018–2019	Chiang Yu-an (蔣淯安) Taiwan Beer	Charles Garcia Fubon Braves
2019–2020	Chiang Yu-an (蔣淯安) Taiwan Beer	Chiang Yu-an (蔣淯安) Taiwan Beer
2020–2021	Hsieh Tsung-jung (謝宗融) Bank of Taiwan	Finals cancelled due to pandemic
2021–2022	Zak Irvin Bank of Taiwan	Finals cancelled due to pandemic
2023	Ke Min-Hao (柯旻豪) Yulon Dinos	Sarr Bamba Yulon Dinos
2024	Chang Chia-he (張家禾) Bank of Taiwan	Chou Shih-yuan (周士淵) Yulon Dinos
2025	Lan Shao-fu (藍少甫) Yulon	Brandon Moss Yulon
2026	Lan Shao-fu (藍少甫) Yulon	Brandon Moss Yulon

== Notable players ==
Note: Flags indicate national team eligibility at FIBA-sanctioned events. Players may hold other non-FIBA nationalities not displayed.

Criteria

To appear in this section a player must have either:

- Set a club record or won an individual award while at the club
- Played at least one official international match for their national team at any time
- Played at least one official NBA match at any time.

=== Guards ===
- Chang Chih-feng (張智峰): 6'0", one-time champion, one-time regular season and finals MVP, two-time All-SBL Team, one-time Defensive Player of the Year, two-time steal champion
- Chen Chih-chung (陳志忠): 6'0", four-time champion, one-time finals MVP, three-time All-SBL Team, one-time Defensive Player of the Year, one-time assist champion, one-time Sixth Man of the Year
- Lee Hsueh-lin (李學林): 5'9", four-time champion, one-time All-SBL Team

=== Forwards ===
- Chen Hsin-an (陳信安): 6'5", two-time champion, one-time regular season MVP, one-time finals MVP, one-time All-SBL Team, one-time scoring champion
- Lin Chih-chieh (林志傑): 6'3", two-time champion, two-time finals MVP, one-time regular season MVP, three-time All-SBL Team, two-time scoring champion
- Jonathan Sanders (桑德斯): 6'7", three-time All-SBL Team, three-time rebound champion, two-time assist champion, one-time Fighter of the Year (年度最佳鬥士)
- Tien Lei (田壘): 6'8", one-time champion, three-time regular season MVP, three-time All-SBL Team, three-time rebound champion, two-time scoring champion, one-time steal champion and played for Sacramento Kings in 2005 NBA Summer League
- Noel Felix
- Marcus Fizer
- Taylor King, Former McDonald's All-American and Duke basketball player

=== Centers ===
- Tseng Wen-ting (曾文鼎): 6'9", four-time champion, two-time finals MVP, one-time regular season MVP, four-time All-SBL Team and Defensive Player of the Year, six-time block champion
- Wu Tai-hao (吳岱豪): 6'8", one-time champion, one-time All-SBL Team, one-time block champion
- Patrick O'Bryant
- Solomon Alabi
- Garret Siler
- Earl Barron

== See also ==
- Chinese Basketball Alliance (CBA)
- Chinese Taipei men's national basketball team
- List of basketball leagues
- P. League+ (PLG)
- Sport in Taiwan
- Taiwan Professional Basketball League (TPBL)
- T1 League
- Women's Super Basketball League (WSBL)
- Taiwanese professional basketball match-fixing scandal
