= Dacin Tigers =

Dacin Tigers 達欣虎
- Founded: 1995
- Folded: 2021
- Location: Taipei, Taiwan
- Team colors: Light blue, yellow & white
- Head coach: (Taiwan) Fan Geng-cheung
- Championships: 2 in the SBL (2008–09, 2016–17)

The Dacin Tigers (traditional Chinese: 達欣虎; simplified Chinese: 达欣虎; pinyin: Dáxīn Lánqiú Duì) was a semi-professional basketball club based in Taipei, Taiwan that played in the Super Basketball League (SBL). They won SBL championships in 2009 and 2017.

On May 17, 2019, Dacin Engineering issued a statement that it will no longer participate in the Super Basketball League (SBL), nor will it invest in the professionalization of Taiwanese basketball. They returned to the social first-class basketball league, and withdraw again in 2021.

== Notable players ==
- Set a club record or won an individual award as a professional player.
- Played at least one official international match for his senior national team at any time.

- (Belize) Noel Felix
- (Canada) Sim Bhullar
- (Lebanon) Norvel Pelle
- (Taiwan) Cheng Chih-lung
- (Taiwan) Tien Lei
- (United States) O. J. Mayo

== Notable coaches ==
- (Taiwan) Liu Chia-fa 2003–07
- (Taiwan) Qiu Da-zong 2007–12, 2015–17
- (Taiwan) Hsu Zhi-chao 2012–15
- (Taiwan) Fan Geng-xiang 2017–19

== SBL regular season records ==
- 2003–04 season: 3rd place
- 2004–05 season: 3rd place
- 2005–06 season: 3rd place
- 2006–07 season: 4th place
- 2007–08 season: 5th place
- 2008–09 season: 1st place
- 2009–10 season: 1st place
- 2010–11 season: 3rd place
- 2011–12 season: 3rd place
- 2012–13 season: 3rd place
- 2013–14 season: 4th place
- 2014–15 season: 7th place
- 2015–16 season: 3rd place
- 2016–17 season: 1st place
- 2017–18 season: 4th place
- 2018–19 season: 6th place

== Championships ==
2008–09

- Champions: Dacin Tigers
- Runners-up: Taiwan Beer

2016–17

- Champions: Dacin Tigers
- Runners-up: Yulon Luxgen Dinos
