= Taiwan Beer (basketball) =

Taiwan Beer 台灣啤酒籃球隊
- Leagues: Super Basketball League
- Founded: 1968; 58 years ago
- History: Taiwan Tobacco and Wine Monopoly Bureau Golden Dragons (1968–1999); Taiwan Beer (1999–present)
- Arena: Various
- Team colors: Green and white
- Head coach: Wang Jian-Wei
- Championships: 6 (SBL)
Home	Away

The Taiwan Beer Basketball Team (Chinese: 台灣啤酒籃球隊) is a professional basketball team in the Super Basketball League (SBL) and The Asian Tournament (TAT), sponsored by the Taiwan Tobacco and Liquor Corporation (TTL). Before the privatization of the sponsoring corporation in 1999, the team was named Taiwan Tobacco and Wine Monopoly Bureau Golden Dragons (公賣金龍) and was among the most successful franchises in Taiwan's amateur Division A conference (甲組聯賽). Since the inauguration of the SBL in 2003, the team has turned into a semi-professional club and won back-to-back championships between 2006 and 2008, bearing the new name of "Taiwan Beer".

== Current roster ==
Taiwan Beer roster
Players
Coaches

Pos.	No.	Nat.	Name	Ht.	Wt.	Age	From
G	0	(Taiwan)	Lin Li	1.81 m (5 ft 11 in)	78 kg (172 lb)	25 – 20 June 2001	NCCU
G	1	(Taiwan)	Wang Hsin-Wei	1.85 m (6 ft 1 in)	90 kg (198 lb)	29 – 8 May 1997	VNU
G	3	(Taiwan)	Lu Zong-Lin	1.75 m (5 ft 9 in)	70 kg (154 lb)	31 – 17 November 1994	NTUST
G	5	(Taiwan)	Chiang Chi-An	1.73 m (5 ft 8 in)	63 kg (139 lb)	25 – 9 September 2001	UT
F	6	(Taiwan)	Hsieh Cheng-An	1.90 m (6 ft 3 in)	90 kg (198 lb)	25 – 24 November 2000	NTSU
G	7	(Taiwan)	Lu Chieh-Min	1.84 m (6 ft 0 in)	85 kg (187 lb)	31 – 12 October 1995	FJU
G	8	(Taiwan)	Cheng Chun-Lung	1.80 m (5 ft 11 in)	86 kg (190 lb)	35 – 8 January 1991	USC
G	9	(Taiwan)	Wang Chun-Sheng	1.81 m (5 ft 11 in)	83 kg (183 lb)	23 – 8 January 2003	NFU
F	10	(Taiwan)	Tseng Pin-Fu	1.95 m (6 ft 5 in)	89 kg (196 lb)	30 – 1 March 1996	UCH
F	11	(Taiwan)	Lai Chun-Ting	1.86 m (6 ft 1 in)	80 kg (176 lb)	26 – 7 July 2000	Grand River
G	15	(Taiwan)	Tien Hao	1.74 m (5 ft 9 in)	70 kg (154 lb)	28 – 16 September 1998	NCCU
SG	24	(Taiwan)	Chang Keng-Yu	1.88 m (6 ft 2 in)	88 kg (194 lb)	30 – 16 October 1995	NTUS
F	25	(Taiwan)	Chen Yu-An	1.92 m (6 ft 4 in)	90 kg (198 lb)	26 – 26 May 2000	UT
F	42	(Taiwan)	Fan Shih-En	1.98 m (6 ft 6 in)	85 kg (187 lb)	32 – 1 June 1994	NTUST
F	65	(Saint Vincent and the Grenadines)	Brendon Smart (FS)	1.98 m (6 ft 6 in)	95 kg (209 lb)	31 – 5 October 1995	UCH
F	77	(Taiwan)	Kuo Chia-An	1.97 m (6 ft 6 in)	100 kg (220 lb)	22 – 25 October 2003	NTSU
F	89	(Taiwan)	Chou Po-Hsun	1.97 m (6 ft 6 in)	92 kg (203 lb)	35 – 6 March 1991	MDU
C	-	(Taiwan)	Chen Chao-Hao	1.99 m (6 ft 6 in)	95 kg (209 lb)	34 – 12 June 1992	NKNU
C	-	(Taiwan)	Wu Hung-Hsing	2.02 m (6 ft 8 in)	96 kg (212 lb)	36 – 21 October 1989	SRHS
PG	-	(Taiwan)	Lu Chi-Erh	1.87 m (6 ft 2 in)	80 kg (176 lb)	34 – 15 January 1992	NKNU

Head coach

- (Taiwan) Wang Jian-Wei

Assistant coach(es)

- (Taiwan) Shang Wei-Fang
- (Taiwan) Yang Chin-Min
- (Taiwan) Lin Chieh-He

Athletic trainer(s)

- (Taiwan) Lin Yi-Chia
- (Taiwan) Chou Yueh-Chang
- (Taiwan) Huang Po-Yen

Team manager

- (Taiwan) Wang Chien-Chih

Legend

- (C) Team captain
- (FS) Foreign student player
- Injured

- Roster
Updated: 2026-10-12

== Notable players ==
Note: Flags indicate national team eligibility at FIBA-sanctioned events. Players may hold other non-FIBA nationalities not displayed.

Criteria

To appear in this section a player must have either:

- Set a club record or won an individual award while at the club
- Played at least one official international match for their national team at any time
- Played at least one official NBA match at any time.

- Chang Jung-Hsuan
- Chen Shih-Nien
- Chiang Yu-An
- Chien You-Che
- Chieng Li-Huan
- Chou Chun-San
- Chou Po-Hsun
- Douglas Creighton
- Ho Shou-Cheng
- Hsu Hao-Cheng
- Huang Hung-Han
- Huang Jhen
- Huang Tsung-Han
- Lee Kai-Yan
- Lin Chih-Chieh
- Liu Cheng
- Lu Chi-Min
- Luo Hsing-Liang
- Patrick O'Bryant
- Shang Wei-Fan
- Walter Sharpe
- Su I-Chieh
- Troy Williams
- Wu Chien-Lung
- Wu Tai-Hao
- Wu Yung-Jen
- Yang Chin-Min
- Yang Yu-Ming
- Yen Hsing-Su
- Yu Huan-Ya

== Head coaches ==
#	Name	Term	GC	W	L	Win%	GC	W	L	Win%	Achievements
#	Name	Term	Regular season				Playoffs				Achievements
Taiwan Beer
1	Yan Chia-Hua	2003–2016	407	233	174	.572	96	57	39	.594	2013–2014 SBL Coach of the Year. 4 championships (2007, 2008, 2011, 2016).
2	Chou Chun-San	2016–2023	215	136	79	.633	34	17	17	.500	2019–20, 2020–2021 SBL Coach of the Year. 2 championships (2020, 2021).
3	Yang Chih-Hao	2024	30	20	10	.667	5	2	3	.400	2024 SBL Coach of the Year.
4	Liu Meng-Chu	2025–2026	58	28	30	.483	5	1	4	.200	
5	Wang Jian-Wei	2026–present	0	0	0	–	–	–	–	–	

== SBL regular season records ==
- 2003–2004 season: 6th place
- 2004–2005 season: 4th place
- 2005–2006 season: 2nd place
- 2006–2007 season: 3rd place
- 2007–2008 season: 2nd place
- 2008–2009 season: 3rd place
- 2009–2010 season: 4th place
- 2010–2011 season: 1st place
- 2011–2012 season: 2nd place
- 2012–2013 season: 7th place
- 2013–2014 season: 3rd place
- 2014–2015 season: 3rd place
- 2015–2016 season: 2nd place
- 2016–2017 season: 3rd place
- 2017–2018 season: 6th place
- 2018–2019 season: 2nd place
- 2019–2020 season: 1st place
- 2020–2021 season: 1st place
- 2021–2022 season: 2nd place
- 2022–2023 season: 3rd place
- 2023–2024 season: 1st place
- 2024–2025 season: 2nd place
- 2025–2026 season: 4th place

== Championships ==
2006–2007

- Champions: Taiwan Beer
- Runners-up: Dacin Tigers

2007–2008

- Champions: Taiwan Beer
- Runners-up: Yulon Dinos

2010–2011

- Champions: Taiwan Beer
- Runners-up: Dacin Tigers

2015–2016

- Champions: Taiwan Beer
- Runners-up: Pure-Youth Construction Basketball Team

2019–2020

- Champions: Taiwan Beer
- Runners-up: Yulon Luxgen Dinos

2020–2021

- Champions: Taiwan Beer & Yulon Dinos

== See also ==
- TaiwanBeer HeroBears
- Super Basketball League
