= Jeoutai Technology =

Taiwanese semi-professional basketball team

Jeoutai Technology 九太科技
- Sport: Basketball
- Founded: 1997
- Folded: 2022
- League: SBL
- Based in: Kaohsiung, Taiwan
- Head coach: (Taiwan) Xu Zhongyi

Jeoutai Technology (traditional Chinese: 九太科技籃球隊; simplified Chinese: 九太科技篮球队; pinyin: Jiǔtài Kējì Lánqiú Duì), formerly known as the ETTV Antelopes (traditional Chinese: 東森羚羊; simplified Chinese: 东森羚羊; pinyin: dōng sēn líng yáng) and Kinmen Kaoliang Liquor (traditional Chinese: 金門高粱酒廠籃球隊; simplified Chinese: 金门高粱酒厂篮球队; pinyin: Jīnmén Gāoliáng Jiǔchǎng Lánqiú Duì) was a semi-professional basketball team that plays in the Super Basketball League (SBL), the first-tier basketball league in Taiwan. In 2008, Kinmen Kaoliang Liquor took over the team from ETTV and adopted the new team name, it is now officially sponsored by Kinmen Kaoliang Liquor.

== SBL regular season records ==
- 2003–2004 season: 5th place
- 2004–2005 season: 5th place
- 2005–2006 season: 6th place
- 2006–2007 season: 5th place
- 2007–2008 season: 3rd place
- 2008–2009 season: 5th place
- 2009–2010 season: 6th place
- 2010–2011 season: 7th place
- 2011–2012 season: 5th place
- 2012–2013 season: 6th place
- 2013–2014 season: 6th place
- 2014–2015 season: 6th place
- 2015–2016 season: 7th place
- 2016–2017 season: 6th place
- 2017–2018 season: 3rd place
- 2018–2019 season: 5th place
- 2019–2020 season: 5th place
- 2020–2021 season: 4th place
- 2021–2022 season: 4th place

== List of head coaches ==
- (Taiwan) Chen Yong-le 2003–04
- (Taiwan) Liu Hua-lin 2004–05
- (Taiwan) Li Yun-hsiang 2005–06
- (Taiwan) Qiu Da-zong 2006–07
- (Taiwan) Wu Jian-guo 2007–08
- (Taiwan) Luo Tian-jin 2008–11, 2012–13
- (Taiwan) Hsu Zhi-chao 2011–12, 2015–16
- (Taiwan) Yang Zhi-hao 2013–14
- (Taiwan) Wu Jun-xiong 2014–15, 2017–19
- (Taiwan) Yang Che-Yi 2016–17
- (Taiwan) Liu Jia-fa 2019–2021
- (Taiwan) Xu Zhongyi 2022

== See also ==
- Kinmen
- List of basketball leagues
