= Taipei Fubon Braves all-time roster =

Taiwanese basketball team roster

The following is a list of players, both past and current, who appeared at least in one game for the Taipei Fubon Braves (2014–present), Taiwan Mobile (2007–2014), Videoland Hunters (2004–2007), or Mars (1993–1999, 2003–2004) franchise.

== Players ==
G	Guard	G/F	Guard-forward	F	Forward	F/C	Forward-center	C	Center

^{x}	Denotes player who is currently on the Taipei Fubon Braves roster

=== A ===
Player	Chinese Name	Pos.	From	Yrs	Seasons
Kelvin Allen	凱文	C	University of Memphis	1	1994–1995

=== B ===
Player	Chinese Name	Pos.	From	Yrs	Seasons	Ref.
Sedrick Barefield	巴爾菲特	G	University of Utah	1	2023–2024	
Earl Barron	巴隆	C	University of Memphis	2	2015–2017	
Tyler Bey	泰勒	F	University of Colorado Boulder	1	2023–2024	
Sim Bhullar	-	C	New Mexico State University	1	2019–2020	
Mario Boggans	馬力豹	C	Oklahoma State University	1	2009	
Taylor Braun	布朗	F	North Dakota State University	1	2023–2024	
T. J. Burke	包提傑	F/C	Vanguard University	2	2016–2018	
Paul Butorac	保羅	C	Eastern Washington University	1	2015–2016	

=== C ===
Player	Chinese Name	Pos.	From	Yrs	Seasons	Ref.
Dennis Carr	卡爾	C	College of Central Florida	1	2011–2012	
Chai Wei	柴瑋	F	Taiwan Shoufu University	1	2016–2017	
Chang Chen-Ya^{x}	張鎮衙	F	National Chengchi University	1	2024–present	
Chang Jung-Hsuan	張容軒	F	National Taiwan Normal University	4	2011–2015	
Chang Keng-Yu	張耕淯	F	National Taiwan University of Sport	2	2021–2023	
Chang Ping-Hsiang	常秉祥	F/C	National Pingtung Senior High School	1	1994–1995	
Chang Po-Wei	張伯維	F	National Taiwan University of Arts	5	2016–2021	
Chang Tsung-Hsien	張宗憲	G/F	Brigham Young University–Hawaii	7	2016–2019; 2020–2024	
Chang Yi-Ming	張益銘	G	Taipei Private Tsai Hsing Senior High School	3	2003–2004; 2010–2011	
Chang Yu-Lin	張羽霖	F	Taipei Physical Education College	5	2011–2016	
Chen Chien-Chia	陳建嘉	G	National Taiwan University of Sport	1	2015–2016	
Chen Ching-Hua	陳京華	F	National Pingtung University of Education	3	2014–2017	
Chen Ching-Huan	陳靖寰	F	Fu Jen Catholic University	2	2011–2013	
Chen Chun-Chieh	陳俊介	G	Taipei Physical Education College	1	1994–1995	
Chen Chung-Chiang	陳忠強	G/F	Fu Jen Catholic University	1	1994–1995	
Chen Fan Po-Yen	陳范柏彥	F	Chien Hsin University of Science and Technology	2	2022–2024	
Chen Hsiao-Jung	陳孝榮	F	De Lin Institute of Technology	7	2011–2018	
Chen Huei	陳暉	G	Chinese Culture University	8	2003–2011	
Chen Li-Wei	陳立偉	G	Taipei Physical Education College	2	2005–2007	
Chen Shih-Nien	陳世念	G	Taipei Physical Education College	2	2012–2014	
Chen Tse-Ming	陳澤銘	C	Fu Jen Catholic University	4	1996–2004	
Chen Tse-Yu	陳則語	G	National Taiwan University of Arts	1	2014–2015	
Chen Yu-Wei^{x}	陳又瑋	G	National Taiwan Normal University	1	2024–present	
Cheng En-Chieh	程恩傑	C	Chinese Culture University	1	2003–2004	
Cheng Jen-Wei	鄭人維	F	National Taiwan Normal University	3	2012–2015	
Cheng Tieh	鄭鐵	G	National Taiwan University of Arts	2	2014–2016	
Cheng Wei	鄭瑋	G	Shih Chien University	1	2014–2015	
Chien Chao-Yi	簡肇熠	G	Chinese Culture University	1	2017–2018	
Chien Wei-Ju	簡偉儒	G	National Taiwan Normal University	2	2020–2022	
Chou Hai-Jung	周海容	G/F	Taipei Physical Education College	5	1994–1999	
Chou Kuei-Yu^{x}	周桂羽	F	National Taiwan Normal University	5	2020–present	
Ben Chung	鍾秀鼐	F	William Jessup University	3	2009; 2014–2016	
Terry Chung	鍾秀鼎	G	Taipei Private Tsai Hsing Senior High School	1	2003–2004	

=== D ===
Player	Chinese Name	Pos.	From	Yrs	Seasons
Dave Davies	戴大偉	G/F	Seattle Pacific University	1	1994–1995
Samuel Deguara	德古拉	C	Malta	1	2021–2022
Marcus Dove	馬可士	C	Oklahoma State University	1	2011–2012

=== E ===
Player	Chinese Name	Pos.	From	Yrs	Seasons	Ref.
Ifeanyi Eboka	伊波卡	F	Shih Hsin University	1	2023–2024	
Maxie Esho	-	F	University of Massachusetts Amherst	1	2019–2020	

=== F ===
Player	Chinese Name	Pos.	From	Yrs	Seasons
Noel Felix	菲立斯	F	California State University, Fresno	1	2012–2013
Marcus Fizer	費瑟	F	Iowa State University	1	2011–2012
Abdul Fox	福克斯	G/F	University of Rhode Island	1	1996–1997
Alexus Foyle	佛伊爾	F	Brigham Young University–Hawaii	1	2010

=== G ===
Player	Chinese Name	Pos.	From	Yrs	Seasons	Ref.
Charles Garcia	賈西亞	F/C	Seattle University	3	2018–2021	
Cheyenne Gibson	紀乾寧	G	University of Memphis	1	1994–1995	
Antonio Grant	葛蘭特	F	University of South Carolina	1	2010	
Steven Guinchard	張文平	F	Emmanuel College	2	2022–2024	

=== H ===
Player	Chinese Name	Pos.	From	Yrs	Seasons	Ref.
Jordan Hamilton^{x}	漢米爾頓	F	University of Texas at Austin	1	2024–present	
Ho Shou-Cheng	何守正	F	National Taiwan Normal University	3	2012–2015	
Hsi Chih-Cheng	席誌成	G	Dahan Institute of Technology	1	2004–2005	
Hsiao Shun-Yi	蕭順議	F	National Taiwan University of Arts	2	2015–2016; 2018–2020	
Hsiao Yuan-Chang	蕭元昶	F/C	Fu Jen Catholic University	2	2010–2012	
Hsieh Zong-Rong	謝宗融	C	National Taiwan University of Science and Technology	2	2022–2024	
Hsiung Jen-Cheng	熊仁正	F	Fu Jen Catholic University	2	2004–2006	
Hsu Cheng-Wen	許誠文	C	National Taiwan Normal University	1	2013–2014	
Hsu Chih-Chiang	許致強	F	Tungnan Institute of Technology	1	2003–2004	
Hsu Kai-Chieh	許凱傑	C	Chinese Culture University	4	2005–2009	
Hsu Tse-Hsin	許澤鑫	G	Taipei Physical Education College	3	2007–2010	
Hsu Wei-Sheng	徐偉勝	F	Taipei Physical Education College	4	2007–2011	
Hu Yu-Wei	胡裕偉	F	Fu Jen Catholic University	4	2003–2007	
Huang Chun-Hsiung	黃春雄	F	Chinese Culture University	2	2004–2006	
Huang You-Sen	黃宥森	G	National Taiwan University of Sport	1	2017–2018	
Hung Chi-Chao	洪啟超	G/F	Taipei Physical Education College	4	2005–2009	
Hung Chih-Shan	洪志善	G	National Taipei University of Technology	3	2016–2019	
Hung Kai-Chieh^{x}	洪楷傑	G	National Chengchi University	3	2022–present	
Hung Ying-Che	洪英哲	C	National Taiwan University of Arts	2	2011–2013	

=== I ===
Player	Chinese Name	Pos.	From	Yrs	Seasons	Ref.
Prince Ibeh	伊貝	C	University of Texas at Austin	1	2023–2024	

=== J ===
Player	Chinese Name	Pos.	From	Yrs	Seasons	Ref.
Jian Ting-Jhao^{x}	簡廷兆	G	Chien Hsin University of Science and Technology	2	2022–present	
Chris Johnson	強森	F/C	Louisiana State University	2	2022–2024	
Frazier Johnson	強森	C	Temple University	1	1996–1997	
Perry Jones	瓊斯	F	Baylor University	2	2021–2023	

=== K ===
Player	Chinese Name	Pos.	From	Yrs	Seasons	Ref.
Kao Chien-Yi	高健益	G	I-Shou University	3	2015–2018	
Kenny Kao	高景炎	G	University of Maryland	1	1995–1996	
Kao Tien-Lin	高天麟	G	Fu Jen Catholic University	1	2004–2005	
Shaquille Keith	基斯	G	Kilgore College	1	2018–2019	
Nick King^{x}	金恩	F	Middle Tennessee State University	1	2024–present	
Kuo Shao-Chieh	郭少傑	G/F	Tungnan University	3	2018–2021	
Kofi Kyei	柯比	C	University of Oregon	1	1994–1995	

=== L ===
Player	Chinese Name	Pos.	From	Yrs	Seasons	Ref.
Lai Kuo-Hung	賴國弘	F/C	Chinese Culture University	6	2003–2009	
Lai Po-Lin	賴柏霖	G	MingDao University	1	2016–2017	
Lai Ting-En^{x}	賴廷恩	G	Fu Jen Catholic University	6	2018–present	
Lai Wei-Ting	賴威廷	G	Shih Hsin University	3	2005–2007; 2013–2014	
Lee Chi-Yi	李啟億	F/C	Taipei Physical Education College	4	2003–2007	
Lee Chih-Chiang	李志強	G	Hujiang High School	1	1994–1995	
Lee Hsiao-Tse	李孝澤	G	National Taiwan University of Arts	1	2003–2004	
Lee Wei-Min	李偉民	G/F	National Taiwan College of Physical Education	2	2006–2008	
Lee Ying-Feng	李盈鋒	F	Taiwan Shoufu University	2	2017–2019	
Li Ping-Hung	李秉鴻	G	National Taiwan Normal University	2	2018–2020	
Lin Chia-Huang	林佳皇	F	Fu Jen Catholic University	8	1994–2006	
Lin Chih-Chieh^{x}	林志傑	F	Fu Jen Catholic University	6	2019–present	
Lin Chih-Lung	林志隆	G	National University of Tainan	3	2011–2014	
Lin Chih-Wei^{x}	林郅為	C	Fu Jen Catholic University	3	2017–2019; 2024–present	
Lin Cheng-Ta	林正達	F/C	National Taiwan Normal University	5	1995–2004	
Lin Hsin-Hua	林信華	F/C	Chinese Culture University	5	2003–2008	
Joseph Lin	林書緯	G	Hamilton College	7	2015–2022	
Lin Meng-Hsueh	林孟學	F	National Taiwan Sport University	9	2015–2024	
Oscar Lin	林冠均	G	Chien Hsin University of Science and Technology	2	2019–2021	
Lin Tsung-Chin	林宗慶	F	Taipei Physical Education College	4	2004–2007; 2015–2016	
Lin Yi-Fu	林義富	F	Fu Jen Catholic University	1	2011–2012	
Lin Yao-Tsung	林耀宗	F	MingDao University	2	2012–2014	
Liu Sheng-Yao	柳昇耀	F	Taipei Physical Education College	10	2007–2017	
Liu Weir-Chern	劉韋辰	F	MingDao University	4	2011–2012; 2013–2014; 2017–2019	
Lu Zong-Lin	呂宗霖	G	National Taiwan University of Science and Technology	1	2022–2023	
Luo Hsing-Liang	羅興樑	G/F	Chinese Culture University	1	2009	

=== M ===
Player	Chinese Name	Pos.	From	Yrs	Seasons	Ref.
Matur Maker	梅克	F	Mississauga Secondary School	1	2023–2024	
O. J. Mayo	-	G	University of Southern California	1	2019–2020	
Mouhamed Mbaye^{x}	莫巴爺	F	National Chengchi University	1	2024–present	
Liam McMorrow	李恩	C	Tennessee Technological University	1	2016–2017	
Tony Mitchell	米歇爾	F	University of North Texas	1	2018–2019	

=== N ===
Player	Chinese Name	Pos.	From	Yrs	Seasons
Luke Nevill	奈維爾	C	University of Utah	1	2013–2014

=== O ===
Player	Chinese Name	Pos.	From	Yrs	Seasons
Patrick O'Bryant	歐布萊恩	C	Bradley University	1	2016–2017
Daniel Orton	歐頓	C	University of Kentucky	1	2018–2019
Ou Yang Chin-Heng	歐陽進恆	G/F	National Taiwan University of Arts	3	2009–2011

=== P ===
Player	Chinese Name	Pos.	From	Yrs	Seasons	Ref.
Pai Ming-Li	白明禮	F	Lee-Ming Institute of Technology	3	1994–1997	
Justin Patton	沛登	C	Creighton University	1	2023–2024	

=== R ===
Player	Chinese Name	Pos.	From	Yrs	Seasons
Andre Riddick	瑞狄克	C	University of Kentucky	1	1996–1997
Kennard Robinson	肯納	C	University of Massachusetts Amherst	1	1994–1995
Todd Rowe	泰勒	F/C	Malone University	4	1994–1998

=== S ===
Player	Chinese Name	Pos.	From	Yrs	Seasons	Ref.
Jonathan Sanders	桑德斯	G	Saint Mary's College of California	1	2006–2007	
Sang Mao-Sen	桑茂森	F	Taipei Physical Education College	6	1994–2004	
Wayne Selden Jr.	賽爾登	G	University of Kansas	1	2023–2024	
Sheng Hsin-Han	沈欣漢	F	Fu Jen Catholic University	1	2005–2006	
Garret Siler	賽勒	C	Augusta University	1	2017–2018	
Mike Singletary	辛特力	F	Texas Tech University	4	2020–2024	
Brendon Smart^{x}	石博恩	F	Chien Hsin University of Science and Technology	4	2020–present	
Su Hsiang-Wei	蘇詳偉	G	National College of Physical Education and Sports	1	2005–2006	
Su I-Chieh	蘇翊傑	G	National Taiwan Normal University	3	2010–2012; 2014–2015	
Sung Yu-Hsuan	宋宇軒	G	Chinese Culture University	2	2016–2018	

=== T ===
Player	Chinese Name	Pos.	From	Yrs	Seasons	Ref.
Teng An-Cheng	鄧安誠	F	National Taiwan Normal University	7	2006–2013	
Darian Townes	陶斯	C	University of Arkansas	1	2014–2015	
Tsai Cheng-Hsien	蔡政憲	C	MingDao University	2	2014–2016	
Tsai Wen-Cheng^{x}	蔡文誠	F	National Changhua University of Education	8	2016–present	
Tsai Yang-Ming	蔡揚名	F	Fu Jen Catholic University	1	2018–2019	
Tsai Zhen-Yueh^{x}	蔡鎮嶽	F	National Kaohsiung Normal University	1	2023–present	
Tseng Hsiang-Chun	曾祥鈞	C	Fu Jen Catholic University	4	2020–2024	
Tseng Tseng-Chiu	曾增球	F	Fu Jen Catholic University	1	1994–1995	
Tseng Wen-Ting	曾文鼎	C	Taipei Physical Education College	3	2019–2022	
Steve Turner	史帝文	C	Ball State University	1	1996–1997	

=== W ===
Player	Chinese Name	Pos.	From	Yrs	Seasons	Ref.
Brandon Walters^{x}	沃特斯	C	Middle Tennessee State University	1	2024–present	
Wang Hsin-Kai	王信凱	G	National Taiwan University of Arts	1	2013–2014	
Wang Libin	王立彬	C	China	5	1994–1999	
Wei Wei	魏維	G	National Taiwan Sport University	8	2010–2017	
Jeff Withey^{x}	威希	C	University of Kansas	1	2024–present	
Ryan Wright	萊特	C	University of Oklahoma	1	2011–2012	
Wu Cheng-Yu	吳政育	G	National Taiwan University of Arts	4	2004–2008	
Wu Hung-Hsing	吳宏興	C	Shin Rong Senior High School	1	2018–2019	
Wu Min-Hsien	吳敏賢	G	MingDao University	1	2011–2012	
Wu Tai-Hao	吳岱豪	F/C	Brigham Young University–Hawaii	3	2012–2015	
Wu Yung-Jen	吳永仁	G	National Taiwan Normal University	10	2006–2011; 2012–2017	
Wu Yung-Sheng^{x}	吳永盛	G	California State University, Sacramento	1	2023–present	

=== Y ===
Player	Chinese Name	Pos.	From	Yrs	Seasons
Yang Che-Yi	楊哲宜	F	Fu Jen Catholic University	4	2003–2007
Yang Hsing-Chih	楊興治	F	National Taiwan Normal University	4	2015–2019
Yen Chen-Hung	顏振弘	C	National Kaohsiung Normal University	4	2009–2012
Yen Hsing-Shu	顏行書	G	Fu Jen Catholic University	5	1995–2004
Yong Kam-Wa	翁金驊	F	Grantham College of Education	1	1996–1997

=== Z ===
Player	Chinese Name	Pos.	From	Yrs	Seasons	Ref.
Ihor Zaytsev	塞瑟夫	C	Ukraine	4	2020–2024	
Stephen Zimmerman	石門	C	University of Nevada, Las Vegas	1	2023–2024	
