= 2023–24 Taipei Fubon Braves season =

Taiwanese professional basketball season

Taipei Fubon Braves
2023–24 season
- President: Tsai Cherng-Ru
- General Manager: Tsai Cherng-Ru
- Head Coach: Hsu Chin-Che
- Arena: Taipei Heping Basketball Gymnasium
- PLG: 18–22 (.450)
- Playoffs: Did not qualify.
- EASL: Group stage
- Scoring leader: Chris Johnson (19.12)
- Rebounding leader: Chris Johnson (11.12)
- Assists leader: Lai Ting-En (3.23)
- Highest home attendance: 7,000 (2 games)
- Lowest home attendance: 4,920 (November 12, 2024)
- Average home attendance: 5,740
- Biggest win: Braves 98–69 Steelers (April 14, 2024)
- Biggest defeat: Braves 71–100 Pilots (January 7, 2024)
- All statistics correct as of May 20, 2024.

The 2023–24 Taipei Fubon Braves season was the franchise's 26th league season, the franchise's fourth season in the P. LEAGUE+ (PLG), its 5th in Taipei City. The Braves are coached by Hsu Chin-Che in his seventh year as head coach. The Braves also participated in 2023–24 East Asia Super League as the 2023 PLG champion.

== Draft ==
| Round | Pick | Player | Position | Status | School/club team |
|---|---|---|---|---|---|
| 1 | 6 | Tsai Chen-Yueh | F | Local | NKNU |

== Standings ==
| Pos | Team | W | L | PCT | GB | Qualification |
|---|---|---|---|---|---|---|
| 1 | Taoyuan Pauian Pilots | 26 | 14 | .650 | — | Playoffs |
| 2 | Formosa Dreamers | 24 | 16 | .600 | 2 | Playoffs |
| 3 | New Taipei Kings | 22 | 18 | .550 | 4 | Playoffs |
| 4 | Hsinchu Toplus Lioneers | 21 | 19 | .525 | 5 | Playoffs |
| 5 | Taipei Fubon Braves | 18 | 22 | .450 | 8 | |
| 6 | Kaohsiung 17LIVE Steelers | 9 | 31 | .225 | 17 | |

Updated to match(es) played on 19 May 2024. Source: P.League+

== Roster ==
Note: Flags indicate national team eligibility at FIBA-sanctioned events. Players may hold other non-FIBA nationalities not displayed.

2023–24 Taipei Fubon Braves roster
Players
Coaches

| Pos. | No. | Nat. | Name | Ht. | Wt. | Age | From |
|---|---|---|---|---|---|---|---|
| G | 0 | (Taiwan) | Lai Ting-En | 1.76 m (5 ft 9 in) | 70 kg (154 lb) | 30 – 22 July 1996 | Fu Jen |
| F | 1 | (Taiwan) | Chen Fan Po-Yen | 1.96 m (6 ft 5 in) | 103 kg (227 lb) | 26 – 24 January 2000 | Chien Hsin Tech |
| G | 3 | (Taiwan) | Chang Tsung-Hsien | 1.92 m (6 ft 4 in) | 88 kg (194 lb) | 37 – 27 December 1988 | BYU–Hawaii |
| C | 5 | (United States) | Chris Johnson (I) | 2.11 m (6 ft 11 in) | 105 kg (231 lb) | 41 – 17 July 1985 | LSU |
| G | 6 | (Taiwan) | Wu Yung-Sheng | 1.86 m (6 ft 1 in) | 82 kg (181 lb) | 29 – 19 October 1996 | Sacramento State |
| F | 8 | (Taiwan) | Chou Kuei-Yu | 1.93 m (6 ft 4 in) | 95 kg (209 lb) | 28 – 19 July 1998 | NTNU |
| F | 10 | (France) (Taiwan) | Steven Guinchard (HP) | 1.95 m (6 ft 5 in) | 85 kg (187 lb) | 33 – 4 July 1993 | Emmanuel College |
| G | 11 | (Taiwan) | Hung Kai-Chieh | 1.85 m (6 ft 1 in) | 85 kg (187 lb) | 27 – 7 October 1998 | NCCU |
| F | 12 | (Taiwan) | Lin Chih-Chieh | 1.92 m (6 ft 4 in) | 92 kg (203 lb) | 44 – 11 June 1982 | Chinese Culture |
| F | 13 | (Taiwan) | Lin Meng-Hsueh | 1.95 m (6 ft 5 in) | 88 kg (194 lb) | 33 – 14 October 1992 | NTSU |
| F | 14 | (Taiwan) | Tsai Wen-Cheng (C) | 1.90 m (6 ft 3 in) | 96 kg (212 lb) | 41 – 31 May 1985 | NCUE |
| C | 15 | (Taiwan) | Hsieh Zong-Rong | 1.99 m (6 ft 6 in) | 80 kg (176 lb) | 31 – 16 August 1995 | NTUST |
| C | 21 | (Taiwan) | Tseng Hsiang-Chun | 2.05 m (6 ft 9 in) | 95 kg (209 lb) | 28 – 8 August 1998 | Fu Jen |
| F | 23 | (Saint Vincent and the Grenadines) | Brendon Smart (FS) | 1.98 m (6 ft 6 in) | 95 kg (209 lb) | 30 – 5 October 1995 | Chien Hsin Tech |
| G | 24 | (Taiwan) | Jian Ting-Jhao | 1.83 m (6 ft 0 in) | 80.2 kg (177 lb) | 28 – 16 January 1998 | Chien Hsin Tech |
| F | 30 | (United States) | Tyler Bey (I) | 2.01 m (6 ft 7 in) | 98 kg (216 lb) | 28 – 10 February 1998 | Colorado |
| C | 32 | (Ukraine) | Ihor Zaytsev (I) | 2.11 m (6 ft 11 in) | 110 kg (243 lb) | 37 – 11 May 1989 | Ukraine |
| F | 33 | (Taiwan) | Tsai Zhen-Yueh | 1.97 m (6 ft 6 in) | 93 kg (205 lb) | 26 – 26 January 2000 | NKNU |
| C | 44 | (United Kingdom) (Rwanda) | Prince Ibeh (I) | 2.08 m (6 ft 10 in) | 110 kg (243 lb) | 32 – 3 June 1994 | Texas |

Head coach

- (Taiwan) Hsu Chin-Che

Assistant coach(es)

- (Taiwan) Wu Yung-Jen
- (Taiwan) Lin Wei-Hao
- (Taiwan) Chiang Chih-Chen
- (Taiwan) Wei Wei

Strength & conditioning coach(es)

- (Taiwan) Jheng Wei-Syuan

Athletic trainer(s)

- (Taiwan) Lin Wu-Chang
- (Taiwan) Peng Yu-Ming (assistant)

Legend

- (C) Team captain
- (I) Import player
- (FS) Foreign student player
- (HP) Heritage player
- (FA) Free agent
- (DP) Unsigned draft pick
- (AI) EASL Asian import
- (S) Suspended
- Injured

- Roster
Updated: April 2, 2024

== Game log ==
=== East Asia Super League ===
==== Group stage ====
October 18
19:00 UTC+8

Boxscore

| Taipei Fubon Braves (Chinese Taipei) | 82–85 (OT) | (Japan) Chiba Jets |
Scoring by quarter: 20–15, 22–14, 13–18, 19–27, Overtime: 8–11
| Pts: Mike Singletary 29; Rebs: Mike Singletary 18; Asts: Barefield, Singletary 4 each | | Pts: Yuki Togashi 38; Rebs: Justyn Mutts 12; Asts: Yuki Togashi 7 |

National Taiwan University Sports Center, Taipei City
Attendance: 3,889

October 25
19:00 UTC+9

Boxscore

| Anyang Jung Kwan Jang Red Boosters (South Korea) | 98–77 | (Chinese Taipei) Taipei Fubon Braves |
Scoring by quarter: 31–17, 29–23, 17–23, 21–14
| Pts: Bae Byung-jun 18; Rebs: Darryl Monroe 9 Asts: Darryl Monroe 10 | | Pts: Barefield, Johnson 18 each Rebs: Chris Johnson 9 Asts: Chris Johnson 6 |

Anyang Gymnasium, Anyang
Attendance: 1,022

November 15
19:00 UTC+8

Boxscore

| Taipei Fubon Braves (Chinese Taipei) | 106–97 | (Philippines) TNT Tropang Giga |
Scoring by quarter: 31–34, 23–18, 30–23, 22–22
| Pts: Chris Johnson 29; Rebs: Mike Singletary 10; Asts: Sedrick Barefield 7 | | Pts: Quincy Miller 34; Rebs: Quincy Miller 10; Asts: Rondae Hollis-Jefferson 10 |

Taipei Heping Basketball Gymnasium, Taipei City

December 20
19:00 UTC+8

Boxscore

| TNT Tropang Giga (Philippines) | 80–69 | (Chinese Taipei) Taipei Fubon Braves |
Scoring by quarter: 17–21, 31–21, 14–16, 18–11
| Pts: Rondae Hollis-Jefferson 35; Rebs: Rondae Hollis-Jefferson 11; Asts: Rondae Hollis-Jefferson 5 | | Pts: Chris Johnson 19; Rebs: Chris Johnson 20; Asts: Chou Kuei-Yu 6 |

City of Santa Rosa Multi-Purpose Complex, Santa Rosa

December 27
19:00 UTC+9

Boxscore

| Chiba Jets (Japan) | 76–60 | (Chinese Taipei) Taipei Fubon Braves |
Scoring by quarter: 17–14, 20–16, 21–13, 18–17
| Pts: John Mooney 21; Rebs: Cooks, Mooney 15 each Asts: Yuki Togashi 6 | | Pts: Sedrick Barefield 16; Rebs: Stephen Zimmerman 13; Asts: Barefield, Jian, Lai, Wu, Zimmerman 1 each |

Funabashi Arena, Funabashi
Attendance: 4,125

February 7
19:00 UTC+8

Boxscore

| Taipei Fubon Braves (Chinese Taipei) | 70–84 | (South Korea) Anyang Jung Kwan Jang Red Boosters |
Scoring by quarter: 19–28, 20–28, 16–18, 15–10
| Pts: Ihor Zaytsev 17; Rebs: Justin Patton 11; Asts: Ihor Zaytsev 8 | | Pts: Robert Carter 21; Rebs: Robert Carter 13; Asts: Jamil Wilson 7 |

Taipei Heping Basketball Gymnasium, Taipei City

=== B.League preseason ===
September 23
18:00 UTC+9

Recap

| Ryukyu Golden Kings | 79–79 | Taipei Fubon Braves |
Scoring by quarter: 15–22, 16–15, 23–20, 25–22
| Pts: Vic Law 25; Rebs: Vic Law 12; Asts: Ryuichi Kishimoto 5 | | Pts: Mike Singletary 20; Rebs: Stephen Zimmerman 11; Asts: Sedrick Barefield 3 |

Okinawa Arena, Okinawa

September 24
18:00 UTC+9

| Ryukyu Golden Kings | 81–73 | Taipei Fubon Braves |
Scoring by quarter: 20–18, 23–10, 17–22, 21–23
| Pts: Ryuichi Kishimoto 16; Rebs: Durham, Kirk 10 each Asts: Ryuichi Kishimoto 7 | | Pts: Ihor Zaytsev 16; Rebs: Singletary, Zimmerman 7 each Asts: Mike Singletary 5 |

Okinawa Arena, Okinawa

=== The Interleague Basketball Games ===
October 21
2:30pm

Recap

| Taipei Fubon Braves | 98–104 | Kaohsiung Aquas |
Scoring by quarter: 31–24, 28–27, 18–26, 21–27
| Pts: Singletary, Zimmerman 17 each Rebs: Stephen Zimmerman 11; Asts: Hung, Johnson, Lai, Singletary, Tseng 3 each | | Pts: Mindaugas Kupsas 20; Rebs: Mindaugas Kupsas 13; Asts: Jason Brickman 11 |

Intercontinental Basketball Stadium, Taichung City
Referees: Yu Jung, Chen Chao-Hung, Chen Chao-Ying

=== Preseason ===
2023 preseason game log
Total: 1–1 (Home: 0–0; Road: 1–1)
Preseason : 1–1 (Home: 0–0; Road: 1–1)

| Game | Date | Team | Score | High points | High rebounds | High assists | Location Attendance | Record |
|---|---|---|---|---|---|---|---|---|
| 1 | October 7 | @Steelers | L 84–103 | Sedrick Barefield (23) | Hsieh Zong-Rong (13) | Sedrick Barefield (4) | Keelung Municipal Stadium; 3,286 | 0–1 |
| 2 | October 9 | @Pilots | W 102–96 | Mike Singletary (18) | Mike Singletary (9) | Lin C., Tsai W. (5) | Keelung Municipal Stadium; 4,597 | 1–1 |

2023–24 schedule

=== Regular season ===
2023–24 game log
Total: 18–22 (home: 11–9; road: 7–13)
November : 2–2 (Home: 1–1; Road: 1–1)

| Game | Date | Team | Score | High points | High rebounds | High assists | Location Attendance | Record |
|---|---|---|---|---|---|---|---|---|
| 1 | November 11 | Kings | L 89–96 | Ihor Zaytsev (20) | Ihor Zaytsev (10) | Chang, Zaytsev (4) | Taipei Heping Basketball Gymnasium; 7,000 | 0–1 |
| 2 | November 12 | Steelers | W 115–94 | Ihor Zaytsev (17) | Singletary, Zimmerman (11) | Mike Singletary (7) | Taipei Heping Basketball Gymnasium; 4,920 | 1–1 |
| 3 | November 19 | @Dreamers | L 86–89 | Ihor Zaytsev (26) | Ihor Zaytsev (12) | Lin Chih-Chieh (5) | Changhua County Stadium; 3,639 | 1–2 |
| 4 | November 26 | @Lioneers | W 99–84 | Mike Singletary (25) | Ihor Zaytsev (10) | Mike Singletary (8) | Hsinchu County Stadium; 4,577 | 2–2 |

December : 3–3 (Home: 1–1; Road: 2–2)

| Game | Date | Team | Score | High points | High rebounds | High assists | Location Attendance | Record |
|---|---|---|---|---|---|---|---|---|
| 5 | December 2 | @Dreamers | L 76–90 | Chen Fan Po-Yen (18) | Chris Johnson (13) | Barefield, Johnson (4) | Intercontinental Basketball Stadium; 3,000 | 2–3 |
| 6 | December 9 | @Steelers | W 93–80 | Mike Singletary (34) | Mike Singletary (12) | Chou Kuei-Yu (7) | Fengshan Arena; 2,795 | 3–3 |
| 7 | December 16 | Steelers | W 111–104 | Chris Johnson (25) | Stephen Zimmerman (15) | Chris Johnson (7) | Taipei Heping Basketball Gymnasium; 5,215 | 4–3 |
| 8 | December 17 | Lioneers | L 102–103 | Mike Singletary (25) | Mike Singletary (10) | Mike Singletary (10) | Taipei Heping Basketball Gymnasium; 5,360 | 4–4 |
| 9 | December 23 | @Kings | L 106–111 | Mike Singletary (29) | Mike Singletary (14) | Mike Singletary (5) | Xinzhuang Gymnasium; 6,540 | 4–5 |
| 10 | December 31 | @Kings | W 104–96 | Mike Singletary (29) | Tseng Hsiang-Chun (12) | Ihor Zaytsev (6) | Xinzhuang Gymnasium; 6,540 | 5–5 |

January : 4–3 (Home: 3–0; Road: 1–3)

| Game | Date | Team | Score | High points | High rebounds | High assists | Location Attendance | Record |
|---|---|---|---|---|---|---|---|---|
| 11 | January 7 | @Pilots | L 71–100 | Ihor Zaytsev (18) | Stephen Zimmerman (11) | Ihor Zaytsev (4) | Taoyuan Arena; 2,046 | 5–6 |
| 12 | January 9 | @Pilots | L 87–96 | Mike Singletary (25) | Chris Johnson (10) | Hung, Lin C. (3) | Taoyuan Arena; 1,297 | 5–7 |
| 13 | January 14 | @Dreamers | W 94–84 | Chris Johnson (22) | Chris Johnson (16) | Mike Singletary (5) | Intercontinental Basketball Stadium; 3,000 | 6–7 |
| 14 | January 20 | @Lioneers | L 72–77 | Mike Singletary (28) | Mike Singletary (16) | Ihor Zaytsev (6) | Hsinchu County Stadium; 5,002 | 6–8 |
| 15 | January 27 | Dreamers | W 103–98 | Mike Singletary (26) | Mike Singletary (17) | Chou, Lai (5) | Taipei Heping Basketball Gymnasium; 5,815 | 7–8 |
| 16 | January 28 | Pilots | W 106–83 | Justin Patton (16) | Tsai Wen-Cheng (12) | Tsai Wen-Cheng (6) | Taipei Heping Basketball Gymnasium; 5,015 | 8–8 |
| 17 | January 31 | Dreamers | W 111–104(OT) | Chris Johnson (37) | Lin Chih-Chieh (12) | Lin C., Johnson (5) | Taipei Heping Basketball Gymnasium; 6,258 | 9–8 |

February : 2–3 (Home: 2–2; Road: 0–1)

| Game | Date | Team | Score | High points | High rebounds | High assists | Location Attendance | Record |
|---|---|---|---|---|---|---|---|---|
| 18 | February 3 | Steelers | L 89–90 | Chris Johnson (27) | Chris Johnson (23) | Ihor Zaytsev (6) | Taipei Heping Basketball Gymnasium; 5.236 | 9–9 |
| 19 | February 4 | Lioneers | W 109–103 | Chou Kuei-Yu (19) | Chris Johnson (16) | Jian Ting-Jhao (4) | Taipei Heping Basketball Gymnasium; 6,055 | 10–9 |
| 20 | February 17 | Dreamers | L 73–96 | Jian Ting-Jhao (17) | Chris Johnson (17) | Jian Ting-Jhao (5) | Taipei Heping Basketball Gymnasium; 5,188 | 10–10 |
| 21 | February 18 | Lioneers | W 102–97 | Ihor Zaytsev (17) | Chris Johnson (9) | Ihor Zaytsev (5) | Taipei Heping Basketball Gymnasium; 5,550 | 11–10 |
| PPD | February 24 | @Pilots | Postponed | | | | | |
| 22 | February 27 | @Steelers | L 91–99 | Wayne Selden Jr. (27) | Chris Johnson (18) | Johnson, Lai (5) | Fengshan Arena; 2,835 | 11–11 |

March : 0–4 (Home: 0–2; Road: 0–2)

| Game | Date | Team | Score | High points | High rebounds | High assists | Location Attendance | Record |
|---|---|---|---|---|---|---|---|---|
| 23 | March 3 | @Pilots | L 92–94 | Ihor Zaytsev (27) | Ihor Zaytsev (16) | Ihor Zaytsev (5) | Taoyuan Arena; 2,159 | 11–12 |
| 24 | March 16 | Pilots | L 92–113 | Wayne Selden Jr. (21) | Ihor Zaytsev (15) | Wayne Selden Jr. (7) | Taipei Heping Basketball Gymnasium; 5,590 | 11–13 |
| 25 | March 17 | Kings | L 104–129 | Ihor Zaytsev (29) | Chris Johnson (15) | Lin Chih-Chieh (5) | Taipei Heping Basketball Gymnasium; 7,000 | 11–14 |
| 26 | March 24 | @Pilots | L 76–98 | Lin Chih-Chieh (19) | Ihor Zaytsev (11) | Chang, Lai (3) | Taoyuan Arena; 2,885 | 11–15 |
| 27 | March 30 | @Kings | W 102–77 | Chris Johnson (27) | Chris Johnson (11) | Johnson, Lin C., Lai (4) | Xinzhuang Gymnasium; 4,840 | 12–15 |

April : 3–4 (Home: 1–2; Road: 2–2)

| Game | Date | Team | Score | High points | High rebounds | High assists | Location Attendance | Record |
|---|---|---|---|---|---|---|---|---|
| 28 | April 2 | Lioneers | L 101–120 | Chris Johnson (24) | Chris Johnson (11) | Lin Chih-Chieh (4) | Taipei Heping Basketball Gymnasium; 5,266 | 12–16 |
| 29 | April 6 | Kings | W 122–96 | Johnson, Zaytsev (24) | Chris Johnson (13) | Lai Ting-En (8) | Taipei Heping Basketball Gymnasium; 6,627 | 13–16 |
| 30 | April 7 | Pilots | L 97–101 | Chou Kuei-Yu (32) | Chris Johnson (14) | Lai Ting-En (9) | Taipei Heping Basketball Gymnasium; 5,175 | 13–17 |
| 31 | April 14 | @Steelers | W 98–69 | Chris Johnson (18) | Chris Johnson (10) | Chou Kuei-Yu (6) | Fengshan Arena; 2,034 | 14–17 |
| 32 | April 20 | @Steelers | L 98–107 | Tyler Bey (33) | Tyler Bey (22) | Chou, Johnson (6) | Fengshan Arena; 1,788 | 14–18 |
| 33 | April 27 | @Kings | W 102–74 | Chris Johnson (24) | Chris Johnson (24) | Lai Ting-En (11) | Xinzhuang Gymnasium; 5,122 | 15–18 |
| 34 | April 30 | @Lioneers | L 89–95 | Lin Chih-Chieh (22) | Lin Chih-Chieh (16) | Chris Johnson (6) | Hsinchu County Stadium; 4,432 | 15–19 |

May : 3–3 (Home: 3–1; Road: 0–2)

| Game | Date | Team | Score | High points | High rebounds | High assists | Location Attendance | Record |
|---|---|---|---|---|---|---|---|---|
| 35 | May 4 | Steelers | W 106–95 | Tyler Bey (32) | Ihor Zaytsev (11) | Jian Ting-Jhao (5) | Taipei Heping Basketball Gymnasium; 5,065 | 16–19 |
| 36 | May 5 | Dreamers | W 79–74 | Tyler Bey (22) | Bey, Johnson, Lai (9) | Lai Ting-En (11) | Taipei Heping Basketball Gymnasium; 5,824 | 17–19 |
| 37 | May 7 | Kings | L 95–101 | Chris Johnson (19) | Chris Johnson (14) | Hung Kai-Chieh (4) | Taipei Heping Basketball Gymnasium; 6,375 | 17–20 |
| 38 | May 11 | @Dreamers | L 81–85 | Chris Johnson (30) | Chris Johnson (21) | Chang, Johnson, Lin C. (3) | Intercontinental Basketball Stadium; 3,000 | 17–21 |
| 39 | May 17 | Pilots | W 92–89 (OT) | Jian Ting-Jhao (21) | Ihor Zaytsev (9) | Chou Kuei-Yu (7) | Taipei Heping Basketball Gymnasium; 6,275 | 18–21 |
| 40 | May 19 | @Lioneers | L 109–128 | Chris Johnson (22) | Hung, Hsieh (7) | Tyler Bey (5) | Hsinchu County Stadium; 5,188 | 18–22 |

2023–24 schedule

== Player statistics ==
Legend
| GP | Games played | MPG | Minutes per game | 2P% | 2-point field goal percentage |
| 3P% | 3-point field goal percentage | FT% | Free throw percentage | RPG | Rebounds per game |
| APG | Assists per game | SPG | Steals per game | BPG | Blocks per game |
| PPG | Points per game | | Led the league |

=== Regular season ===
| Player | GP | MPG | PPG | 2P% | 3P% | FT% | RPG | APG | SPG | BPG |
|---|---|---|---|---|---|---|---|---|---|---|
| Sedrick Barefield^{‡} | 1 | 32:59 | 6.00 | 33.33% | 0.00% | 0.00% | 2.00 | 4.00 | 1.00 | 0.00 |
| Tyler Bey^{≠} | 9 | 32:13 | 18.78 | 54.55% | 23.26% | 68.89% | 9.11 | 1.78 | 1.67 | 0.11 |
| Taylor Braun^{≠‡} | 1 | 22:39 | 9.00 | 0.00% | 100.00% | 0.00% | 7.00 | 2.00 | 0.00 | 0.00 |
| Chang Tsung-Hsien | 16 | 14:02 | 3.63 | 40.00% | 21.43% | 55.56% | 1.31 | 1.81 | 0.63 | 0.06 |
| Chen Fan Po-Yen | 24 | 09:49 | 4.13 | 34.04% | 34.48% | 70.00% | 1.29 | 0.33 | 0.17 | 0.00 |
| Chou Kuei-Yu | 40 | 25:26 | 7.58 | 40.49% | 31.58% | 69.23% | 2.38 | 2.70 | 1.08 | 0.08 |
| Ifeanyi Eboka^{‡} | 12 | 12:27 | 4.08 | 43.90% | 0.00% | 68.42% | 3.00 | 1.00 | 0.75 | 0.25 |
| Steven Guinchard | 20 | 09:13 | 2.65 | 44.44% | 25.53% | 33.33% | 0.70 | 0.80 | 0.20 | 0.05 |
| Hsieh Zong-Rong | 16 | 06:54 | 3.06 | 60.00% | 14.29% | 58.82% | 2.00 | 0.13 | 0.06 | 0.13 |
| Hung Kai-Chieh | 32 | 16:34 | 5.50 | 43.48% | 35.05% | 73.68% | 2.03 | 1.78 | 0.97 | 0.13 |
| Prince Ibeh^{≠} | 9 | 22:08 | 6.67 | 55.10% | 0.00% | 40.00% | 5.33 | 0.78 | 1.22 | 1.78 |
| Jian Ting-Jhao | 38 | 19:54 | 6.61 | 48.91% | 28.97% | 88.89% | 1.89 | 1.84 | 0.37 | 0.03 |
| Chris Johnson | 33 | 33:13 | 19.12 | 51.59% | 35.23% | 80.47% | 11.12 | 2.88 | 0.97 | 0.97 |
| Lai Ting-En | 35 | 19:29 | 5.51 | 43.37% | 32.43% | 65.00% | 2.17 | 3.23 | 1.54 | 0.00 |
| Lin Chih-Chieh | 36 | 22:20 | 9.94 | 53.79% | 29.28% | 71.25% | 4.67 | 2.69 | 1.03 | 0.03 |
| Lin Meng-Hsueh | 5 | 05:24 | 2.60 | 100.00% | 25.00% | 66.67% | 1.60 | 0.40 | 0.20 | 0.00 |
| Matur Maker^{≠‡} | 1 | 19:52 | 9.00 | 20.00% | 50.00% | 66.67% | 12.00 | 0.00 | 0.00 | 1.00 |
| Justin Patton^{≠‡} | 7 | 23:16 | 8.43 | 55.00% | 9.09% | 54.55% | 6.43 | 1.00 | 0.71 | 0.71 |
| Wayne Selden Jr.^{≠‡} | 4 | 31:16 | 15.25 | 42.31% | 31.82% | 85.71% | 3.00 | 3.25 | 1.00 | 0.25 |
| Mike Singletary^{‡} | 13 | 35:49 | 21.15 | 46.15% | 37.84% | 82.81% | 9.85 | 4.54 | 1.38 | 0.77 |
| Brendon Smart | 12 | 11:18 | 4.25 | 33.33% | 36.36% | 100.00% | 2.17 | 0.42 | 0.75 | 0.25 |
| Tsai Wen-Cheng | 32 | 12:38 | 3.97 | 47.12% | 26.32% | 56.00% | 3.34 | 1.56 | 0.31 | 0.03 |
| Tsai Zhen-Yueh | Did not play | | | | | | | | | |
| Tseng Hsiang-Chun | 27 | 15:19 | 5.15 | 41.18% | 33.33% | 59.52% | 4.07 | 0.78 | 0.30 | 0.30 |
| Wu Yung-Sheng | 25 | 10:06 | 2.92 | 35.90% | 30.95% | 54.55% | 0.92 | 0.92 | 0.32 | 0.00 |
| Ihor Zaytsev | 35 | 32:16 | 14.34 | 57.14% | 36.75% | 64.71% | 7.37 | 2.43 | 0.91 | 0.91 |
| Stephen Zimmerman^{‡} | 6 | 28:38 | 8.50 | 46.81% | 0.00% | 58.33% | 10.00 | 1.83 | 1.17 | 0.67 |

^{‡} Waived during the season
^{≠} Acquired during the season

== Transactions ==
=== Free Agency ===
==== Re-signed ====
| Date | Player | Contract terms | Ref. |
|---|---|---|---|
| August 22, 2023 | Mike Singletary | —N/a | |
| August 23, 2023 | Ihor Zaytsev | —N/a | |
| August 24, 2023 | Chris Johnson | —N/a | |

==== Additions ====
| Date | Player | Contract terms | Former Team | Ref. |
|---|---|---|---|---|
| July 8, 2023 | Sedrick Barefield | —N/a | (Guinea) SLAC | |
| August 1, 2023 | Wu Yung-Sheng | multi-year contract, worth unknown | Formosa Taishin Dreamers | |
| August 18, 2023 | Tsai Zhen-Yueh(Tsai Chen-Yueh) | 2+1-year contract, worth unknown | NKNU | |
| August 31, 2023 | Stephen Zimmerman | —N/a | (Japan) Rizing Zephyr Fukuoka | |
| November 7, 2023 | Ifeanyi Eboka | —N/a | Hsinchu JKO Lioneers | |
| December 15, 2023 | Taylor Braun | —N/a | Hsinchu Lioneers | |
| January 12, 2024 | Justin Patton | —N/a | (China) Shanxi Loongs | |
| February 16, 2024 | Wayne Selden Jr. | —N/a | Hong Kong Bulls | |
| February 27, 2024 | Matur Maker | —N/a | (New Zealand) Nelson Giants | |
| March 15, 2024 | Prince Ibeh | —N/a | (Uruguay) Peñarol | |
| March 22, 2024 | Tyler Bey | —N/a | (Philippines) Magnolia Hotshots | |

==== Subtractions ====
| Date | Player | Reason | New Team | Ref. |
|---|---|---|---|---|
| June 30, 2023 | Chang Keng-Yu | contract expired | Taipei Taishin | |
| October 2, 2023 | Lu Zong-Lin | mutual agreement to part ways | Taiwan Beer | |
| January 4, 2024 | Sedrick Barefield | mutual agreement to part ways | (Philippines) Blackwater Bossing | |
| January 4, 2024 | Taylor Braun | injury | —N/a | |
| January 24, 2024 | Stephen Zimmerman | contract terminated | (Malaysia) NS Matrix Deers | |
| January 31, 2024 | Ifeanyi Eboka | mutual agreement to part ways | Yulon Luxgen Dinos | |
| March 15, 2024 | Matur Maker | waived | (Australia) Rockhampton Rockets | |
| March 15, 2024 | Justin Patton | waived | (Dominican Republic) Indios de San Francisco de Macorís | |
| March 22, 2024 | Wayne Selden Jr. | waived | (France) Chorale Roanne | |
| April 2, 2024 | Mike Singletary | injury | —N/a | |

== Awards ==
=== End-of-season awards ===
| Recipient | Award | Ref. |
|---|---|---|
| Lin Chih-Chieh | Mr. Popular | |
| Lin Chih-Chieh | All-PLG 2nd Team | |
| Fubon Angels | PLG Cheerleader Squad of the Year | |
| Lee Ho-Zeong | PLG Cheerleader Rookie of the Year | |
| Chou Kuei-Yu | All-PLG Team | |

=== Players of the Week ===
| Week | Recipient | Date awarded | Ref. |
|---|---|---|---|
| Week 12 | Lin Chih-Chieh | January 27 - January 31 | |

=== Players of the Month ===
| Recipient | Month awarded | Ref. |
|---|---|---|
| Lin Chih-Chieh | January | |
