= 2024–25 Taipei Fubon Braves season =

Taiwanese professional basketball season

Taipei Fubon Braves
2024–25 season
- President: Tsai Cherng-Ru
- General Manager: Tsai Cherng-Ru
- Head Coach: Hsu Chin-Che
- Arena: Taipei Heping Basketball Gymnasium
- All statistics correct as of July 8, 2024.

The 2024–25 Taipei Fubon Braves season is the franchise's 27th league season, 5th season in the P. LEAGUE+ (PLG), and 6th season in Taipei City. The Braves are coached by Hsu Chin-Che in his eighth year as head coach.

== Draft ==
| Round | Pick | Player | Position | Status | School/club team |
|---|---|---|---|---|---|
| 1 | 1 | Mouhamed Mbaye | F | Foreign student | NCCU |
| 3 | 9 | Chiang Chun | F | Local | FJU |

On July 12, 2024, the Braves acquired 2024 first-round 1st draft pick from Kaohsiung 17LIVE Steelers in exchange for Chen Fan Po-Yen, 2024 first-round draft pick and 2024 second-round draft pick. On August 2, the third-rounder Chiang Chun had signed with Taipei Taishin Mars of the Taiwan Professional Basketball League.

== Roster ==
Note: Flags indicate national team eligibility at FIBA-sanctioned events. Players may hold other non-FIBA nationalities not displayed.

2024–25 Taipei Fubon Braves roster
Players
Coaches

| Pos. | No. | Nat. | Name | Ht. | Wt. | Age | From |
|---|---|---|---|---|---|---|---|
| G | 0 | (Taiwan) | Lai Ting-En | 1.76 m (5 ft 9 in) | 70 kg (154 lb) | 29 – 22 July 1996 | Fu Jen |
| C | 1 | (United States) | Brandon Walters (I) | 2.08 m (6 ft 10 in) | 113 kg (249 lb) | 30 – 19 January 1995 | Middle Tennessee |
| G | 4 | (Taiwan) | Chen Yu-Wei | 1.83 m (6 ft 0 in) | 85 kg (187 lb) | 25 – 29 December 1999 | NTNU |
| F | 5 | (United States) | Jordan Hamilton (I) | 2.01 m (6 ft 7 in) | 100 kg (220 lb) | 34 – 6 October 1990 | Texas |
| G | 6 | (Taiwan) | Wu Yung-Sheng | 1.86 m (6 ft 1 in) | 82 kg (181 lb) | 28 – 19 October 1996 | Sacramento State |
| F | 7 | (United States) | Nick King (I) | 2.03 m (6 ft 8 in) | 102 kg (225 lb) | 30 – 5 August 1995 | Middle Tennessee |
| F | 8 | (Taiwan) | Chou Kuei-Yu | 1.93 m (6 ft 4 in) | 95 kg (209 lb) | 27 – 19 July 1998 | NTNU |
| G | 11 | (Taiwan) | Hung Kai-Chieh | 1.85 m (6 ft 1 in) | 85 kg (187 lb) | 26 – 7 October 1998 | NCCU |
| F | 12 | (Taiwan) | Lin Chih-Chieh | 1.92 m (6 ft 4 in) | 92 kg (203 lb) | 43 – 11 June 1982 | Chinese Culture |
| F | 14 | (Taiwan) | Tsai Wen-Cheng (C) | 1.90 m (6 ft 3 in) | 96 kg (212 lb) | 40 – 31 May 1985 | NCUE |
| C | 18 | (Taiwan) | Lin Chih-Wei | 2.00 m (6 ft 7 in) | 95 kg (209 lb) | 33 – 10 July 1992 | Chinese Culture |
| F | 23 | (Saint Vincent and the Grenadines) | Brendon Smart (FS) | 1.98 m (6 ft 6 in) | 95 kg (209 lb) | 29 – 5 October 1995 | Chien Hsin Tech |
| G | 24 | (Taiwan) | Jian Ting-Jhao | 1.83 m (6 ft 0 in) | 80.2 kg (177 lb) | 27 – 16 January 1998 | Chien Hsin Tech |
| F | 27 | (Taiwan) | Chang Chen-Ya | 1.96 m (6 ft 5 in) | 86 kg (190 lb) | 25 – 13 October 1999 | NCCU |
| F | 33 | (Taiwan) | Tsai Zhen-Yueh | 1.97 m (6 ft 6 in) | 93 kg (205 lb) | 25 – 26 January 2000 | NKNU |
| C | 55 | (United States) | Jeff Withey (I) | 2.13 m (7 ft 0 in) | 104 kg (229 lb) | 35 – 7 March 1990 | Kansas |
| F | 00 | (Senegal) | Mouhamed Mbaye (FS) | 2.05 m (6 ft 9 in) | 105 kg (231 lb) | 24 – 1 January 2001 | NCCU |

Head coach

- (Taiwan) Hsu Chin-Che

Assistant coach(es)

- (Taiwan) Wu Yung-Jen
- (Taiwan) Liang Chao-Hsuan
- (Taiwan) Lin Wei-Hao
- (Taiwan) Wei Wei

Strength & conditioning coach(es)

- (Taiwan) Jheng Wei-Syuan

Athletic trainer(s)

- (Taiwan) Lin Wu-Chang
- (Taiwan) Peng Yu-Ming (assistant)

Legend

- (C) Team captain
- (I) Import player
- (FS) Foreign student player
- (HP) Heritage player
- (FA) Free agent
- (DP) Unsigned draft pick
- (AI) EASL Asian import
- (S) Suspended
- Injured

- Roster
Updated: September 1, 2024

== Game log ==
=== Preseason ===
2024 preseason game log
Total: 0–0 (Home: 0–0; Road: 0–0)
Preseason : 0–0 (Home: 0–0; Road: 0–0)

| Game | Date | Team | Score | High points | High rebounds | High assists | Location Attendance | Record |
|---|---|---|---|---|---|---|---|---|
| 1 | October 12 | Steelers | | | | | NCKU Chung Cheng Gym | |
| 2 | October 13 | @GhostHawks | | | | | NCKU Chung Cheng Gym | |

2024–25 schedule

== Transactions ==
=== Trades ===
July 12, 2024
To Taipei Fubon Braves

- 2024 first-round 1st pick
To Kaohsiung 17LIVE Steelers

- Chen Fan Po-Yen
- 2024 first-round pick
- 2024 second-round pick

=== Free Agency ===
==== Re-signed ====
| Date | Player | Contract terms | Ref. |
|---|---|---|---|
| June 25, 2024 | Lin Chih-Chieh | 1-year contract, worth unknown | |
| July 16, 2024 | Hung Kai-Chieh | multi-year contract, worth unknown | |
| July 17, 2024 | Chou Kuei-Yu | multi-year contract, worth unknown | |

==== Additions ====
| Date | Player | Contract terms | Former Team | Ref. |
|---|---|---|---|---|
| July 18, 2024 | Lin Chih-Wei | multi-year contract, worth unknown | Kaohsiung 17LIVE Steelers | |
| July 23, 2024 | Nick King | — | Tainan TSG GhostHawks | |
| August 1, 2024 | Chen Yu-Wei | — | Kaohsiung 17LIVE Steelers | |
| August 7, 2024 | Mouhamed Mbaye | — | NCCU Griffins | |
| August 15, 2024 | Brandon Walters | — | (Turkey) Yalovaspor | |
| August 16, 2024 | Jordan Hamilton | — | (Japan) Aomori Wat's | |
| August 26, 2024 | Jeff Withey | — | (South Korea) Wonju DB Promy | |
| August 31, 2024 | Chang Chen-Ya | multi-year contract, worth unknown | Taoyuan Pauian Pilots | |

==== Subtractions ====
| Date | Player | Reason | New Team | Ref. |
|---|---|---|---|---|
| June 17, 2024 | Prince Ibeh | contract expired | (Mexico) El Calor de Cancún | |
| July 1, 2024 | Chang Tsung-Hsien | contract expired | Formosa Dreamers | |
| July 1, 2024 | Lin Meng-Hsueh | contract expired | — | |
| July 12, 2024 | Hsieh Zong-Rong | contract expired | Tainan TSG GhostHawks | |
| July 15, 2024 | Tseng Hsiang-Chun | contract expired | (Japan) Toyotsu Fighting Eagles Nagoya | |
| July 22, 2024 | Chris Johnson | contract expired | New Taipei Kings | |
| July 31, 2024 | Steven Guinchard | contract expired | — | |
| August 5, 2024 | Tyler Bey | contract expired | (Israel) Hapoel Haifa | |
| August 19, 2024 | Ihor Zaytsev | contract expired | Taipei Taishin Mars | |
