= 2019–20 Taipei Fubon Braves season =

Taiwanese professional basketball season

Taipei Fubon Braves
2019-20 season
- President: Tsai Ming-Chung
- General Manager: Tsai Cherng-Ru
- Head Coach: Hsu Chin-Che
- Arena: Taipei Heping Basketball Gymnasium
- ABL: 9-8(.529)
- Biggest win: Braves 100-85 Black Bears (January 10, 2020); Braves 104-89 Wolf Warriors (January 12, 2020)
- Biggest defeat: Braves 60-92 Dragons (February 12, 2020)

The 2019–20 Taipei Fubon Braves season was the franchise's 22nd league season, the first season of the franchise in the ASEAN Basketball League (ABL), its 1st in the Taipei City and playing home games at Taipei Heping Basketball Gymnasium. They are coached by Hsu Chin-Che in his third year as head coach.

== Standings ==
Team	GP	W	L	PCT
(Thailand) Mono Vampire	16	12	4	.750
(Philippines) San Miguel Alab Pilipinas	16	10	6	.625
(Malaysia) Kuala Lumpur Dragons	17	10	7	.588
(Chinese Taipei) Formosa Dreamers	14	8	6	.571
(Chinese Taipei) Taipei Fubon Braves	17	9	8	.529
Macau Black Bears	14	7	7	.500
Singapore Slingers	17	7	10	.412
Macau Wolf Warriors	13	5	8	.385
Hong Kong Eastern	10	3	7	.300
(Vietnam) Saigon Heat	14	3	11	.214

== Roster ==
Note: Flags indicate national team eligibility at FIBA-sanctioned events. Players may hold other non-FIBA nationalities not displayed.

2019–20 Taipei Fubon Braves roster
Players
Coaches

Pos.	No.	Nat.	Name	Ht.	Wt.	Age	From
G	0	(Chinese Taipei)	Lai Ting-En	1.76 m (5 ft 9 in)	70 kg (154 lb)	28 – 22 July 1996	Fu Jen
G	1	(United States) (Chinese Taipei)	Joseph Lin	1.82 m (6 ft 0 in)	69 kg (152 lb)	32 – 21 June 1992	Hamilton
G	6	(Chinese Taipei) (Australia)	Oscar Lin	1.83 m (6 ft 0 in)	90 kg (198 lb)	29 – 21 August 1995	Chien Hsin Tech
F	7	(Chinese Taipei)	Chang Po-Wei	1.90 m (6 ft 3 in)	88 kg (194 lb)	34 – 22 July 1990	NTUA
F	9	(Chinese Taipei)	Kuo Shao-Chieh	1.90 m (6 ft 3 in)	80 kg (176 lb)	34 – 9 April 1990	TNU
F	11	(Chinese Taipei)	Hsiao Shun-Yi	1.94 m (6 ft 4 in)	86 kg (190 lb)	32 – 23 October 1992	NTUA
F	12	(Chinese Taipei)	Lin Chih-Chieh	1.92 m (6 ft 4 in)	92 kg (203 lb)	42 – 11 June 1982	Chinese Culture
F	13	(Chinese Taipei)	Lin Meng-Hsueh	1.95 m (6 ft 5 in)	88 kg (194 lb)	32 – 14 October 1992	NTSU
F	14	(Chinese Taipei)	Tsai Wen-Cheng	1.90 m (6 ft 3 in)	96 kg (212 lb)	39 – 31 May 1985	NCUE
C	15	(Chinese Taipei)	Lin Chih-Wei	2.00 m (6 ft 7 in)	100 kg (220 lb)	32 – 10 July 1992	Chinese Culture
C	16	(Chinese Taipei)	Wu Hung-Hsing	2.02 m (6 ft 8 in)	83 kg (183 lb)	36 – 21 October 1988	SRSH
G	24	(Chinese Taipei)	Hung Chih-Shan	1.76 m (5 ft 9 in)	80 kg (176 lb)	39 – 5 July 1985	NTUT
F	28	(Chinese Taipei)	Yang Hsing-Chih	1.97 m (6 ft 6 in)	100 kg (220 lb)	31 – 9 November 1993	NTNU
F	30	(Chinese Taipei)	Liu Weir-Chern	1.90 m (6 ft 3 in)	85 kg (187 lb)	36 – 27 November 1988	MingDao
G	32	(United States)	O. J. Mayo (I)	1.96 m (6 ft 5 in)	95 kg (209 lb)	37 – 5 November 1987	USC
F	36	(Belize) (United States)	Charles García (I)	2.04 m (6 ft 8 in)	108 kg (238 lb)	36 – 13 October 1988	Seattle
C	76	(Chinese Taipei)	Tseng Wen-Ting	2.04 m (6 ft 8 in)	97 kg (214 lb)	40 – 6 July 1984	TPEC
F	91	(Chinese Taipei)	Tsai Yang-Ming	1.96 m (6 ft 5 in)	88 kg (194 lb)	30 – 8 January 1995	Fu Jen
G	00	(Chinese Taipei)	Li Ping-Hung	1.83 m (6 ft 0 in)	80 kg (176 lb)	35 – 3 November 1989	NTNU
C	-	(Malta) (Italy)	Samuel Deguara (I)	2.30 m (7 ft 7 in)	131 kg (289 lb)	33 – 21 June 1991	Malta

Head coach

- (Chinese Taipei) Hsu Chin-Che

Assistant coach(es)

- (Chinese Taipei) Wu Yung-Jen
- (Chinese Taipei) Lin Wei-Hao
- (Chinese Taipei) Chiang Chih-Chen
- (Chinese Taipei) Wei Wei

Strength & conditioning coach(es)

- (Chinese Taipei) Jheng Wei-Syuan

Athletic trainer(s)

- (Chinese Taipei) Lin Wu-Chang

Legend

- (C) Team captain
- (I) Import player
- Injured

== Game log ==
=== FIBA Asia Champions Cup ===
==== East Asia Qualifiers ====
August 13

Boxscore

Fubon Braves (Chinese Taipei)	100–56	(India) Punjab Police
Scoring by quarter: 27–16, 28–7, 25–11, 20–22
Pts: Liu Weir-Chern 18; Rebs: Charles García 11; Asts: Lai Ting-En 6		Pts: Rajvir Singh 23; Rebs: Nitish Kumar Sharma 13; Asts: Rajvir Singh 3

Bangkok Thai-Japan Youth Arena I, Bangkok
Referees: Harja Jaladri, Leong Chuen Wing, Nattapong Jontapa

August 14

Boxscore

Fubon Braves (Chinese Taipei)	100–46	(Singapore) SAFSA
Scoring by quarter: 26–7, 23–11, 27–18, 24–10
Pts: Chang Po-Wei 20; Rebs: Wu Hung-Hsing 8 Asts: Lai, Liu 5 each		Pts: Leon Kwek 20; Rebs: Naqib Borhan 7 Asts: Leon Kwek 3

Bangkok Thai-Japan Youth Arena I, Bangkok
Referees: Ricor Buaron, Preeda Muongmee, Prem Kumar Kanneboina

August 15

Boxscore

HiTech Bangkok City (Thailand)	76–77	(Chinese Taipei) Fubon Braves
Scoring by quarter: 15–12, 29–21, 15–15, 17–29
Pts: Xavier Alexander 29; Rebs: John Fields 15; Asts: Alexander, Muangboon 6 each		Pts: Charles García 20; Rebs: Charles García 12; Asts: JeQuan Lewis 5

Bangkok Thai-Japan Youth Arena I, Bangkok
Referees: Harja Jaladri, Leong Chuen Wing, Imran Ali Baig

==== Group Phase ====
September 24

Boxscore

HiTech Bangkok City (Thailand)	69–88	(Chinese Taipei) Fubon Braves
Scoring by quarter: 14–19, 26–18, 12–30, 17–21
Pts: Nino Johnson 18; Rebs: Nino Johnson 14; Asts: Nattakarn Muangboon 3		Pts: Sim Bhullar 23; Rebs: Bhullar, García 14 each Asts: Tsai Wen-Cheng 6

Stadium 29, Nonthaburi

September 25

Boxscore

Fubon Braves (Chinese Taipei)	66–68	(Iran) Naft Abadan
Scoring by quarter: 23–29, 11–11, 12–21, 20–7
Pts: Kuo Shao-Chieh 19; Rebs: Sim Bhullar 18; Asts: Tsai Wen-Cheng 5		Pts: Hamed Haddadi 18; Rebs: Hamed Haddadi 18; Asts: Samad Nikkhah Bahrami 6

Stadium 29, Nonthaburi

September 26

Boxscore

Fubon Braves (Chinese Taipei)	81–85	(Bahrain) Muharraq
Scoring by quarter: 20–19, 14–20, 23–13, 24–33
Pts: Bhullar, García 22 each Rebs: Sim Bhullar 15; Asts: Tsai Wen-Cheng 5		Pts: Kevin Murphy 33; Rebs: Kevin Murphy 11; Asts: Mohamed Buallay 7

Stadium 29, Nonthaburi

=== Regular season ===
2019–20 regular season game log Total: 9-8 (Home: 6-2, Road: 3-6)
Game	Date	Team	Score	High points	High rebounds	High assists	Location attendance	Record
1	November 16	Macau Black Bears	W 95-91				Taipei Heping Basketball Gymnasium	1-0
2	November 17	Kuala Lumpur Dragons	L 90-91	O. J. Mayo (23)	Charles García (9)	Lin Chih-Chieh (4)	Taipei Heping Basketball Gymnasium	1-1
3	November 29	Macau Black Bears	W 106-93				Taipei Heping Basketball Gymnasium	2-1
4	November 30	Hong Kong Eastern	W 102-89				Taipei Heping Basketball Gymnasium	3-1
5	December 7	@Formosa Dreamers	W 90-81				Changhua County Stadium	4-1
6	December 12	@Macau Wolf Warriors	L 83-88				Zhongshan Shaxi Gymnasium	4-2
7	December 21	@Formosa Dreamers	L 80-88				Changhua County Stadium	4-3
8	January 3	Formosa Dreamers	W 83-76				Taipei Heping Basketball Gymnasium	5-3
9	January 4	Singapore Slingers	W 83-77				Taipei Heping Basketball Gymnasium	6-3
10	January 7	@San Miguel Alab Pilipinas	L 96-101	O. J. Mayo (35)	Maxie Esho (6); O. J. Mayo (6); Charles García (6)	O. J. Mayo (9)	Filoil Flying V Centre	6-4
11	January 10	@Macau Black Bears	W 100-85				The Venetian Macao	7-4
12	January 12	@Macau Wolf Warriors	W 104-89	O. J. Mayo (22)	Maxie Esho (10)	O. J. Mayo (10)	Zhongshan Shaxi Gymnasium	8-4
13	January 17	Mono Vampire	W 98-97				Taipei Heping Basketball Gymnasium	9-4
14	January 18	Hong Kong Eastern	L 78-105	O. J. Mayo (23); Charles García (23)	Charles García (5)	Joseph Lin (4)	Taipei Heping Basketball Gymnasium	9-5
15	February 9	@Singapore Slingers	L 99-106(OT)	Maxie Esho (25); Charles García (25)	Charles García (10)	Maxie Esho (5)	OCBC Arena	9-6
16	February 12	@Kuala Lumpur Dragons	L 60-92	Maxie Esho (17)	Maxie Esho (9)	Tsai Wen-Cheng (2); O. J. Mayo (2)	MABA Stadium	9-7
17	February 15	@Mono Vampire	L 86-90 (OT)	Charles García (22)	Charles García (9)	O. J. Mayo (9)	Stadium 29	9-8

== Player statistics ==
Legend
GP	Games played	MPG	Minutes per game	FG%	Field goal percentage
3P%	3-point field goal percentage	FT%	Free throw percentage	RPG	Rebounds per game
APG	Assists per game	SPG	Steals per game	BPG	Blocks per game
PPG	Points per game		Led the league

=== Regular season ===
Player	GP	MPG	PPG	FG%	3P%	FT%	RPG	APG	SPG	BPG
Lai Ting-En	10	7.1	2.1	52%	75%	0%	0.6	1.4	0.7	0.0
Joseph Lin	13	24.7	8.4	49%	29%	50%	2.8	3.2	1.5	0.0
Oscar Lin	7	8.7	2.4	63%	33%	100%	1.0	0.5	0.5	0.2
Chang Po-Wei	13	7.8	2.3	27%	16%	57%	0.6	0.6	0.0	0.0
Sim Bhullar										
Kuo Shao-Chieh	16	6.7	3.0	42%	31%	100%	0.6	0.4	0.4	0.0
Hsiao Shun-Yi	2	2.6	0.0	0%	0%	0%	0.0	0.0	0.0	0.0
Lin Chih-Chieh	6	23.0	10.8	47%	39%	66%	3.5	4.0	0.6	0.0
Lin Meng-Hsueh	13	10.5	2.0	41%	11%	62%	2.0	0.6	0.0	0.0
Tsai Wen-Cheng	14	24.6	9.0	46%	45%	66%	4.1	2.0	0.9	0.0
Lin Chih-Wei	3	1.5	0.0	0%	0%	0%	0.0	0.0	0.0	0.0
Wu Hung-Hsing	6	4.7	0.8	40%	0%	50%	1.0	0.1	0.0	0.0
Maxie Esho	10	34.1	18.1	45%	34%	75%	6.4	1.5	1.1	1.1
Hung Chih-Shan	17	11.8	2.5	45%	39%	0%	1.0	1.4	0.1	0.0
Yang Hsing-Chih										
Liu Weir-Chern	4	3.5	0.0	0%	0%	0%	0.5	0.0	0.2	0.0
O. J. Mayo	17	33.9	22.0	49%	44%	69%	4.7	4.4	1.7	0.2
Charles García	17	31.0	19.8	54%	21%	79%	9.1	2.4	1.0	1.0
Tseng Wen-Ting	17	16.6	3.1	38%	26%	0%	2.6	2.1	0.5	0.5
Tsai Yang-Ming										
Li Ping-Hung										

== Transactions ==
=== Free Agency ===
==== Re-signed ====
Date	Player	Contract terms	Ref.
August 29, 2019	Hung Chih-Shan	—	
October 17, 2019	Charles García	—	

==== Additions ====
Date	Player	Contract terms	Former teams	Ref.
August 11, 2019	Lin Bing-Sheng	—	PCCU	
August 11, 2019	JeQuan Lewis	—	Kymis	
August 15, 2019	Lin Chih-Chieh	—	Zhejiang Guangsha Lions	
August 28, 2019	Oscar Lin	—	UCH	
September 22, 2019	Sim Bhullar	—	Dacin Tigers	
October 18, 2019	O. J. Mayo	—	Hunan Jinjian Miye	
October 19, 2019	Tseng Wen-Ting	—	Sichuan Jinqiang Blue Whales	
December 24, 2019	Maxie Esho	—	CLS Knights Indonesia	
March 2, 2020	Samuel Deguara	—	San Miguel Alab Pilipinas	

==== Subtractions ====
Date	Player	Reason	New team	Ref.
April 23, 2019	Tony Mitchell	contract expired	NLEX Road Warriors	
August 28, 2019	JeQuan Lewis	—	P.A.O.K.	
September 5, 2019	Chang Tsung-Hsien	contract expired	Formosa Dreamers	
September 23, 2019	Lin Bing-Sheng	—	Shaanxi Xinda Wolves	
September 29, 2019	Lee Ying-Feng	contract expired	Jeoutai Technology	
January 2, 2020	Sim Bhullar	injury replaced by Maxie Esho	Yulon Luxgen Dinos	
March 2, 2020	Maxie Esho	injury replaced by Samuel Deguara	Hebraica Macabi	

== Awards ==
=== Players of the Month ===
Recipient	Month awarded	Ref.
O. J. Mayo	January	

=== Players of the Week ===
Week	Recipient	Ref.
Week 3	O. J. Mayo	
Week 7	O. J. Mayo	
