= Justin Patton =

American basketball player (born 1997)

Free agent
- Position: Center

Personal information
- Born: June 14, 1997 (age 29) Omaha, Nebraska, U.S.
- Listed height: 6 ft 11 in (2.11 m)
- Listed weight: 241 lb (109 kg)

Career information
- High school: Omaha North (Omaha, Nebraska)
- College: Creighton (2016–2017)
- NBA draft: 2017: 1st round, 16th overall pick
- Drafted by: Chicago Bulls
- Playing career: 2017–present

Career history
- 2017–2018: Minnesota Timberwolves
- 2017–2018: →Iowa Wolves
- 2018–2019: Philadelphia 76ers
- 2018–2019: →Delaware Blue Coats
- 2019–2020: Oklahoma City Thunder
- 2019–2020: →Oklahoma City Blue
- 2020: Wisconsin Herd
- 2021: Westchester Knicks
- 2021: Houston Rockets
- 2021–2022: Hapoel Eilat
- 2022–2023: Cholet Basket
- 2023: Shanxi Loongs
- 2024: Taipei Fubon Braves
- 2024: Indios de San Francisco
- 2024: Peristeri
- 2024–2025: Liaoning Flying Leopards
- 2025: Cangrejeros de Santurce
- 2025–2026: Al-Ahli Jeddah
- 2026: San Miguel Beermen

Career highlights
- Second-team All-Big East (2017); Big East Rookie of the Year (2017)
- Stats at NBA.com
- Stats at Basketball Reference

Justin Nicholas Patton (born June 14, 1997) is an American professional basketball player who last played for the San Miguel Beermen of the Philippine Basketball Association (PBA). He played college basketball for the Creighton Bluejays. Patton was selected with the 16th overall pick in the 2017 NBA draft by the Chicago Bulls, but was traded to the Minnesota Timberwolves. He has also played for the Philadelphia 76ers and Oklahoma City Thunder. In 2021–22, he led the Israeli Basketball Premier League in blocks per game.

== Early life and education ==
Patton was born to Tora Patton. He has three siblings, Terrel Steen, Kendall Patton, and Raven Bryson. He was a social work major at Creighton, and is the cousin of Creighton's former basketball player Donnie Johnson.

== High school career ==
Patton attended Omaha North High School in Omaha, Nebraska. He played with the Omaha Sports Academy Crusaders on the AAU circuit. He was rated by Scout.com as a five-star recruit and was recruited by Creighton University basketball.

College recruiting
Name	Hometown	School	Height	Weight	Commit date
Justin Patton; C	Omaha, Nebraska	Omaha North	6 ft 10 in (2.08 m)	215 lb (98 kg)	Jun 17, 2014
Justin Patton; C	Recruit ratings: Scout: Rivals: 247Sports: ESPN: (80)				
Overall recruit ranking: Scout: 24 Rivals: 45
Note: In many cases, Scout, Rivals, 247Sports, On3, and ESPN may conflict in their listings of height and weight.; In these cases, the average was taken. ESPN grades are on a 100-point scale.; Sources: "2015 Creighton Basketball Commitment List". Rivals.; "2015 Team Ranking". Rivals.

== College career ==
Patton redshirted his first year at Creighton in 2015. Greg McDermott, his coach, had considered a redshirt for many different reasons. Patton was young for a freshman and still needed to develop his game. Patton also would have to play limited minutes behind Creighton's other big, 7-foot-center Geoff Groselle. McDermott believed that Patton needed to learn how to compete at this level, and learn the importance of a healthy diet and sleep. In his first college game in 2016, he scored 12 points and had eight rebounds. He scored a season high 25 points against St. John's on January 4. 2017. He had 13 straight games in double-figures before breaking it in a loss against Xavier on February 4, 2017. During his freshman season he was named Big East Freshman of the Year, and Second Team All-Big East. On April 5, 2017, Patton relinquished his college eligibility by declaring for the NBA draft and signing with an agent.

== Professional career ==
=== Minnesota Timberwolves (2017–2018) ===
Patton was selected by the Chicago Bulls with the 16th pick in the 2017 NBA draft. On draft night his rights were traded to the Minnesota Timberwolves along with Jimmy Butler in exchange for Zach LaVine, Kris Dunn, and the draft rights to Lauri Markkanen, the seventh pick. On July 4, 2017, Patton signed with the Timberwolves. Patton was to participate in the 2017 NBA Summer League, however, he suffered an injury during the workout and underwent an immediate surgery to repair his broken left foot, and was sidelined indefinitely. Patton made his NBA debut on April 1, 2018, against the Utah Jazz, scoring two points on two shots and made one steal in his only game with the Timberwolves. Patton remained with the team for the rest of their season. On April 18, 2018, Patton underwent surgery on his left foot to encourage further healing of the injury he suffered the previous summer. The team announced he would be sidelined indefinitely. Patton spent the majority of his rookie season with the Iowa Wolves, and started in 38 games, while averaging 12.7 points and 5.4 rebounds in 23.2 minutes per game. On September 18, 2018, Patton underwent surgery for a broken right foot.

=== Philadelphia 76ers (2018–2019) ===
On November 12, 2018, Patton was traded, along with Jimmy Butler, to the Philadelphia 76ers in exchange for Robert Covington, Dario Šarić, Jerryd Bayless, and a 2022 second-round draft pick. On April 3, 2019, Patton was waived by the 76ers after appearing in 3 games.

=== Oklahoma City Thunder (2019–2020) ===
On August 13, 2019, Patton signed with the Thunder. On January 14, 2020, while on assignment for the Oklahoma City Blue, Patton scored a G League-high 45 points to go with 13 rebounds, nine assists, and six blocks in a 149–140 win over the South Bay Lakers.

On January 24, 2020, Patton was traded to the Dallas Mavericks in exchange for Isaiah Roby and cash considerations. He was waived the next day when the team obtained Willie Cauley-Stein.

=== Wisconsin Herd (2020) ===
On February 20, 2020, the Wisconsin Herd announced that they had acquired Patton off waivers. Patton played seven games for the Herd before the season was ended early due to the COVID-19 pandemic. He averaged 12 points, 6.6 rebounds and 3.4 blocks per game with the team.

On June 26, 2020, the Detroit Pistons announced they had signed Patton.

Without appearing in an official game with the Pistons, on November 19, 2020, Patton was traded to the Los Angeles Clippers in a three-team trade. He was waived without appearing in a game for the team.

On December 3, 2020, Patton was signed to a training camp deal by the Milwaukee Bucks. He was waived on December 17.

=== Westchester Knicks (2021) ===
On January 11, 2021, Patton was selected ninth overall by the Westchester Knicks in the first 2021 NBA G League draft.

=== Houston Rockets (2021) ===
On February 19, 2021, the Houston Rockets signed Patton to a two-way contract with the Rio Grande Valley Vipers. However, he was waived on April 3.

=== Hapoel Eilat (2021–2022) ===
On August 26, 2021, Patton signed with Hapoel Eilat of the Israeli Basketball Premier League. In 2021–22, he led the league in blocks average, averaging 1.6 per game.

=== Cholet Basket (2022–2023) ===
On August 3, 2022, Patton signed with Cholet Basket of the French LNB Pro A.

=== Shanxi Loongs (2023) ===
On September 1, 2023, Patton signed with Shanxi Loongs of the Chinese Basketball Association.

=== Taipei Fubon Braves (2024) ===
On January 14, 2024, Patton signed with the Taipei Fubon Braves of the P. League+. On March 15, he was released by the team.

=== Indios de San Francisco de Macorís (2024) ===
On June 13, 2024, Patton signed with the Indios de San Francisco de Macorís of the Liga Nacional de Baloncesto.

=== Peristeri (2024) ===
On August 7, 2024, Patton signed with the Peristeri of the Greek Basketball League.

=== Liaoning Flying Leopards (2024–2025) ===
On December 31, 2024, Patton signed with the Liaoning Flying Leopards of the Chinese Basketball Association.

=== San Miguel Beermen (2026) ===
On March 27, 2026, Patton signed with the San Miguel Beermen of the Philippine Basketball Association (PBA) to replace Marcus Lee as its import for the 2026 PBA Commissioner's Cup. However he reportedly missed three practice session, claimed injury and refused to be picked up by San Miguel's team driver for an April 12, 2026 game. The team management alleged "unprofessional behavior" and brought in Bennie Boatwright as Patton's replacement.

== Career statistics ==
Legend
GP	Games played	GS	Games started	MPG	Minutes per game
FG%	Field goal percentage	3P%	3-point field goal percentage	FT%	Free throw percentage
RPG	Rebounds per game	APG	Assists per game	SPG	Steals per game
BPG	Blocks per game	PPG	Points per game	**Bold**	Career high

=== NBA ===
==== Regular season ====
Year	Team	GP	GS	MPG	FG%	3P%	FT%	RPG	APG	SPG	BPG	PPG
2017–18	Minnesota	1	0	4.0	**.500**	—	—	.0	.0	**1.0**	.0	2.0
2018–19	Philadelphia	3	0	7.0	.286	.000	.500	2.0	1.0	.7	.0	1.7
2019–20	Oklahoma City	5	0	4.8	.400	.250	—	1.0	.4	.0	.0	1.8
2020–21	Houston	**13**	**6**	**19.0**	.414	**.265**	**.750**	**3.8**	**1.1**	.9	**1.1**	**5.4**
Career		22	6	13.8	.404	.250	.667	2.7	.9	.7	.6	3.9

=== NBA G League ===
==== Regular season ====
Year	Team	GP	GS	MPG	FG%	3P%	FT%	RPG	APG	SPG	BPG	PPG
2017–18	Iowa	**38**	**28**	**23.1**	.476	**.300**	**.764**	5.4	**1.6**	**1.0**	1.3	**12.7**
2018–19	Delaware	11	2	18.5	**.500**	.167	.625	**5.6**	**1.6**	.9	**2.0**	8.7
Career		49	30	22.1	.480	.286	.735	5.4	1.6	1.0	1.5	11.8

=== College ===
Year	Team	GP	GS	MPG	FG%	3P%	FT%	RPG	APG	SPG	BPG	PPG
2016–17	Creighton	35	34	25.3	.676	.533	.517	6.2	1.2	.9	1.4	12.9

== Player profile ==
At 7'0, 250 pounds, with a 7'2 ½ wingspan, Patton was initially recruited to Creighton as a defensive center. He is a strong rim-runner, and his passing ability has been compared to that of Vlade Divac. He is able to effectively play above the rim, as a strong finisher. He has sometimes struggled with positioning for rebounds. He is sometimes late to challenge shots at the basket, and sometimes needlessly swipes at the ball, which leads to foul trouble.
