= Tseng Hsiang-chun =

Taiwanese professional basketball player

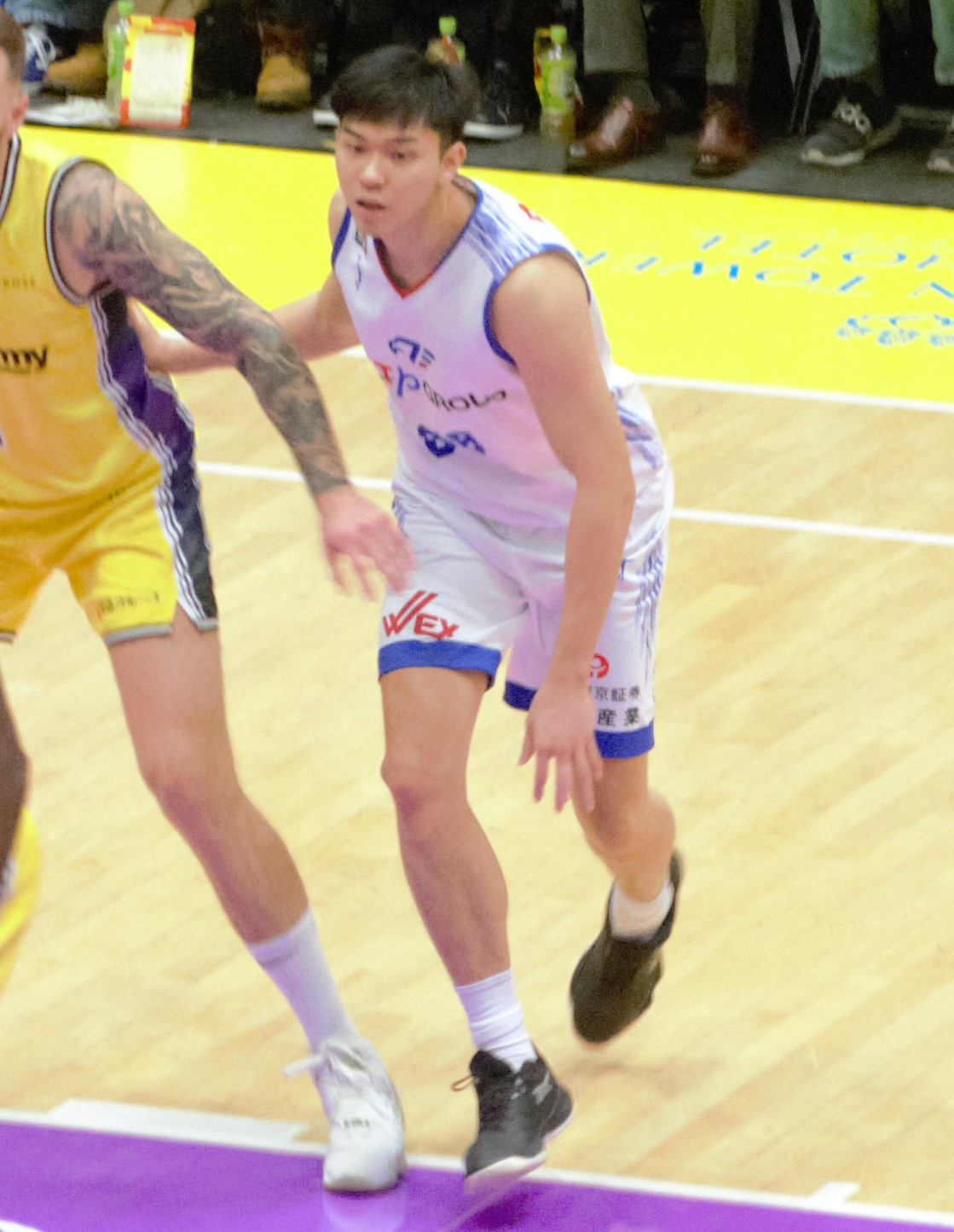

No. 88 – Taipei Fubon Braves
- Position: Center
- League: P. League+

Personal information
- Born: August 8, 1998 (age 28) Taipei City, Taiwan
- Listed height: 6 ft 9 in (2.06 m)
- Listed weight: 209 lb (95 kg)

Career information
- High school: Ku Pao
- College: Fu Jen
- Playing career: 2020–present

Career history
- 2020–2024: Taipei Fubon Braves
- 2024–2025: Fighting Eagles Nagoya
- 2025–present: Taipei Fubon Braves

Career highlights
- 3×P.League+ Champion (2021, 2022, 2023)

Tseng Hsiang-chun (Chinese: 曾祥鈞, born August 8, 1998) is a Taiwanese professional basketball player of Taipei Fubon Braves.

== Professional career ==
On May 26, 2020, Tseng was signed with the Taipei Fubon Braves after graduating from Fu Jen Catholic University. Tseng's debut on October 17, 2020, when Taipei Fubon Braves against Hsinchu JKO Lioneers, he set the double-double record for the first time (11 points and 18 rebounds).

In July 2024, Tseng joined B.League club Fighting Eagles Nagoya with 1 year contract.

In May 2025, Tseng was released by Fighting Eagles Nagoya after the contract was expired.

In August 2025, Tseng returned to Taipei Fubon Braves.

== Career statistics ==
=== P. LEAGUE+ ===
==== Regular season ====
Year	Team	Game played	Game started	Minutes per game	FG%	3P%	FT%	RPG	APG	SPG	BPG	PPG
2020-21	Taipei Fubon Braves											

== Awards and honors ==
=== College ===
- Taiwan University Basketball Association Blocks leader (2018, 2019)
- Taiwan University Basketball Association Rebounds leader (2019)
- Taiwan University Basketball Association Scoring leader (2020)
