= Tsai Wen-cheng =

Taiwanese basketball player (born 1985)

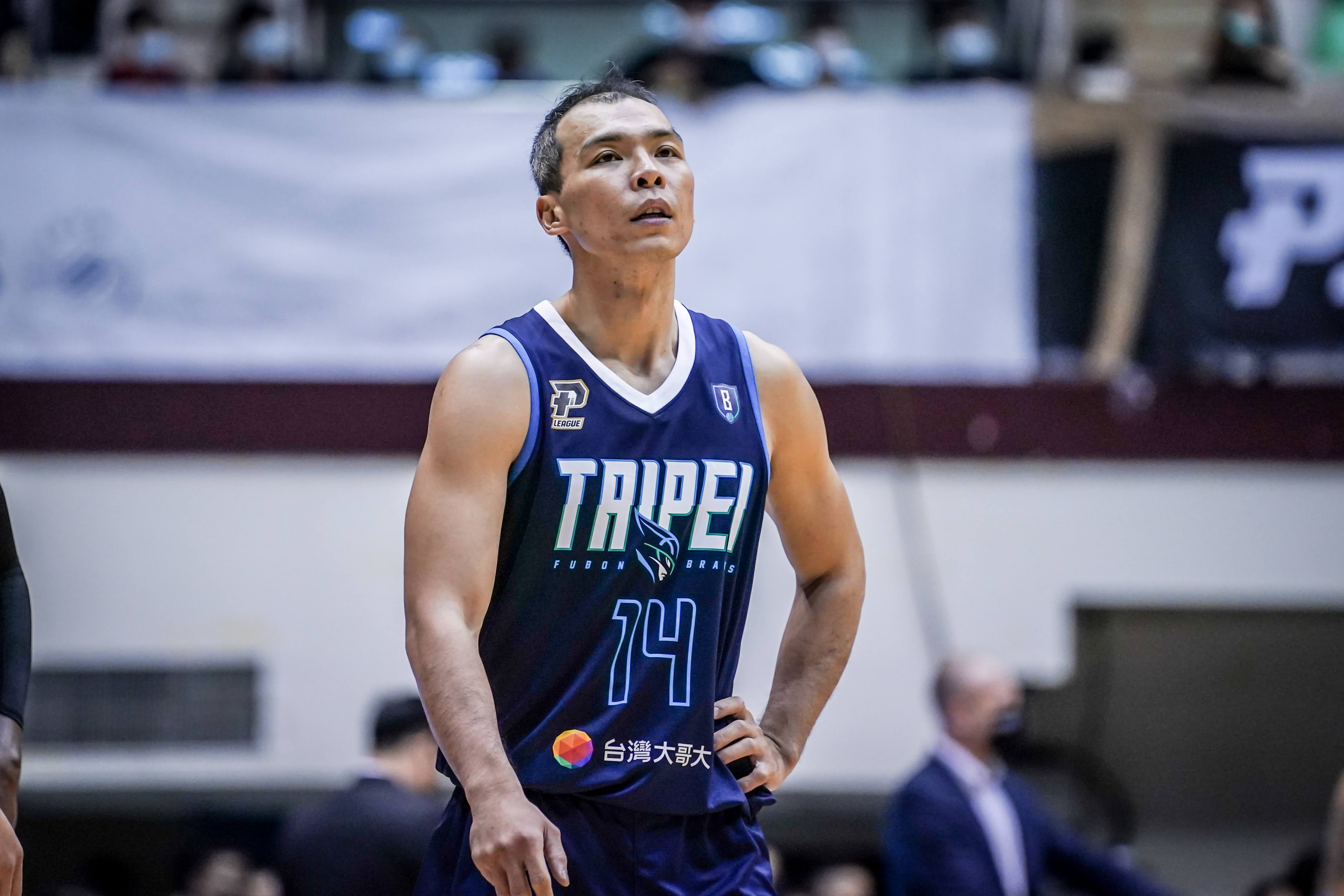

Taipei Fubon Braves
- Position: Small forward
- League: P. League+

Personal information
- Born: 31 May 1985 (age 41) Keelung, Taiwan
- Listed height: 6 ft 3 in (1.91 m)
- Listed weight: 212 lb (96 kg)

Career information
- High school: National Keelung Commercial & Industrial Vocational Senior High School
- College: National Changhua University of Education
- Playing career: 2006–2026

Career history

Playing
- 2006–2016: Taoyuan Pauian Archiland
- 2016–2026: Taipei Fubon Braves

Coaching
- 2026–present: Taipei Fubon Braves (assistant)

Career highlights
- 3× P. League+ champion (2021–2023); 5× SBL champion (2012–2015, 2019); 2× SBL Championship MVP (2013–2014); SBL MVP (2013); 4× SBL First Team (2013, 2014, 2017, 2019); 2× SBL All-Star (2017, 2019)

Tsai Wen-cheng (Chinese: 蔡文誠; born 31 May 1985) is a Taiwanese basketball coach for the Taipei Fubon Braves of the P. League+ and former professional basketball player. During his time in the SBL, he is a two-time All-Star and named to the league's First Team four times and won the MVP in 2013. Additionally, he has won the SBL championship five times and P. League+ championship three times.

== Early and college career ==
Tsai, who is a native of Keelung, attended the National Keelung Commercial & Industrial Vocational Senior High School, where he played for their basketball team, a second-tier team in the HBL. He then attended the National Changhua University of Education (NCUE), where he played for that basketball team. During his senior year summer vacation, he was invited by Yue Ying-li to Taiwan Bank for testing and training, but was rejected by the coach after only two days of training. Before the end of his senior year, Tsai led the NCUE to defeat National Taipei University of Technology in the UNC Cup. This led Hung Chih-shan, the main point guard of National Taipei University of Technology, to recommend Tsai Wen-cheng to Hsu Chin-che.

== Professional career ==
=== Taoyuan Pauian Archiland ===
After graduating from the NCUE, Tsai signed with the Azio TV Eagles in 2006 and stepped onto the Super Basketball League stage. During his time with what would become the Taoyuan Pauian Archiland, he won the SBL title four times.

=== Taipei Fubon Braves ===
On 30 June 2016, Tsai joined the Fubon Braves. On 16 June 2020, he completed a contract swap with Braves, re-signing a 2+1 year contract with the +1 being a "team option".

On 14 August 2026, Tsai decided to retire from professional basketball and joined the coaching team of Taipei Fubon Braves.
