= Taipei Fubon Braves =

Taiwanese basketball team

- 2024–25 Taipei Fubon Braves season
- Leagues: P. League+
- Founded: 1982
- History: List: Chien-hung Men's Basketball Team (建弘男子籃球隊) (1982–1986); Tsu-chiang Basketball Team (自強籃球隊) (1986–1987); Tera Electronics Basketball Team (新銳/泰瑞電子籃球隊) (1987–1994); Tera Mars (泰瑞戰神) (1994–1997); Kaohsiung Mars (高雄戰神) (1997–1999); Mars Professional Basketball Team (戰神職業籃球隊) (1997–2000); BCC Mars (中廣戰神) (2000–2004); Videoland Hunters (緯來獵人) (2004–2007); Taiwan Mobile Leopards (台灣大雲豹) (2007–2011); Taiwan Mobile Basketball Team (台灣大籃球隊) (2012–2013); Fubon Braves (富邦勇士籃球隊) (2014–2019); Taipei Fubon Braves (臺北富邦勇士籃球隊) (2019–)
- Arena: Taipei Heping Basketball Gymnasium
- Capacity: 7,000
- Location: Taipei, Taiwan
- Team colors: Navy blue, aqua, white
- President: Tsai Cherng-Ru
- General manager: Tsai Cherng-Ru
- Head coach: Hsu Chin-Che
- Team captain: Tsai Wen-Cheng
- Ownership: Fubon Group
- Championships: 4 SBL: 1 (2019); PLG: 3 (2021, 2022, 2023)
- Website: https://www.fubonbraves.com/

The Taipei Fubon Braves (Chinese: 臺北富邦勇士) are a professional basketball team that is owned by Fubon Sports & Entertainment, LLC., one of the subsidiaries under Fubon Financial Holding Co., Ltd. and currently plays in the Taiwanese P. League+. From 2014 to 2019, they played in the semi-pro Super Basketball League (SBL). They have also been part of the professional ASEAN Basketball League (ABL) since the 2019–20 ABL season. In the summer of 2020, when P. League+ was founded, they joined the league as one of the four founding teams and secured a three-peat from the 2020-21 season to the 2022-23 season.

== History ==
1982: Established Chien-Hong Men's Basketball Team.

1983: Won the B Division Championship of the Taiwan Provincial Chairman Cup.

1983 December: Registered as an A Division team by the Chinese Taipei Basketball Association.

1987: Owned subsequently by Tera Electronics and won the team’s first Championship in A Division.

1994: The Chinese Basketball Alliance (CBA) was founded, the team was re-branded as Tera Mars (泰瑞戰神) to start their first season in the CBA .

1996 and 1997: Retained team ownership but dropped "Tera" from the name and renamed simply to "Mars" to compete in the third season of the CBA.

1997: Sold to Guoyang Group in, attempted to re-brand as "Kaohsiung Mars" in late February.

mid-1998: Faced naming disputes and financial challenges, settling on "Mars" again

2000: Sponsored by Broadcasting Corporation of China, thus renamed as " BCC Mars".

2003: Joined semi-pro league Super Basketball League (SBL).

2004: Taken over by Videoland Television Network in June. Thus, re-branded as "Videoland Hunters".

2007: Sold to Taiwan Mobile, a major mobile communication provider in Taiwan, and named as "Taiwan Mobile Leopards".

2011: Rebranded as "Taiwan Mobile Basketball Team"

2014: Ownership shipped to Fubon Financial Holding Venture Capital Co., Ltd, and renamed as “Fubon Braves”.

2019: Left SBL to join the ASEAN Basketball League (ABL), a professional league, and started the professional basketball era of Fubon Braves.

2019: Signed a partnership contract with Taipei City Government, became "Taipei Fubon Braves” and started hosting games at Taipei Heping Basketball Gymnasium as their home court in Taipei City.

2020-present: Joined P. League+, the first ever professional basketball league in Taiwan in the past 20 years as one of the four co-founding teams. Achieved significant success by completing a three-peat (21-23).

== Facilities ==
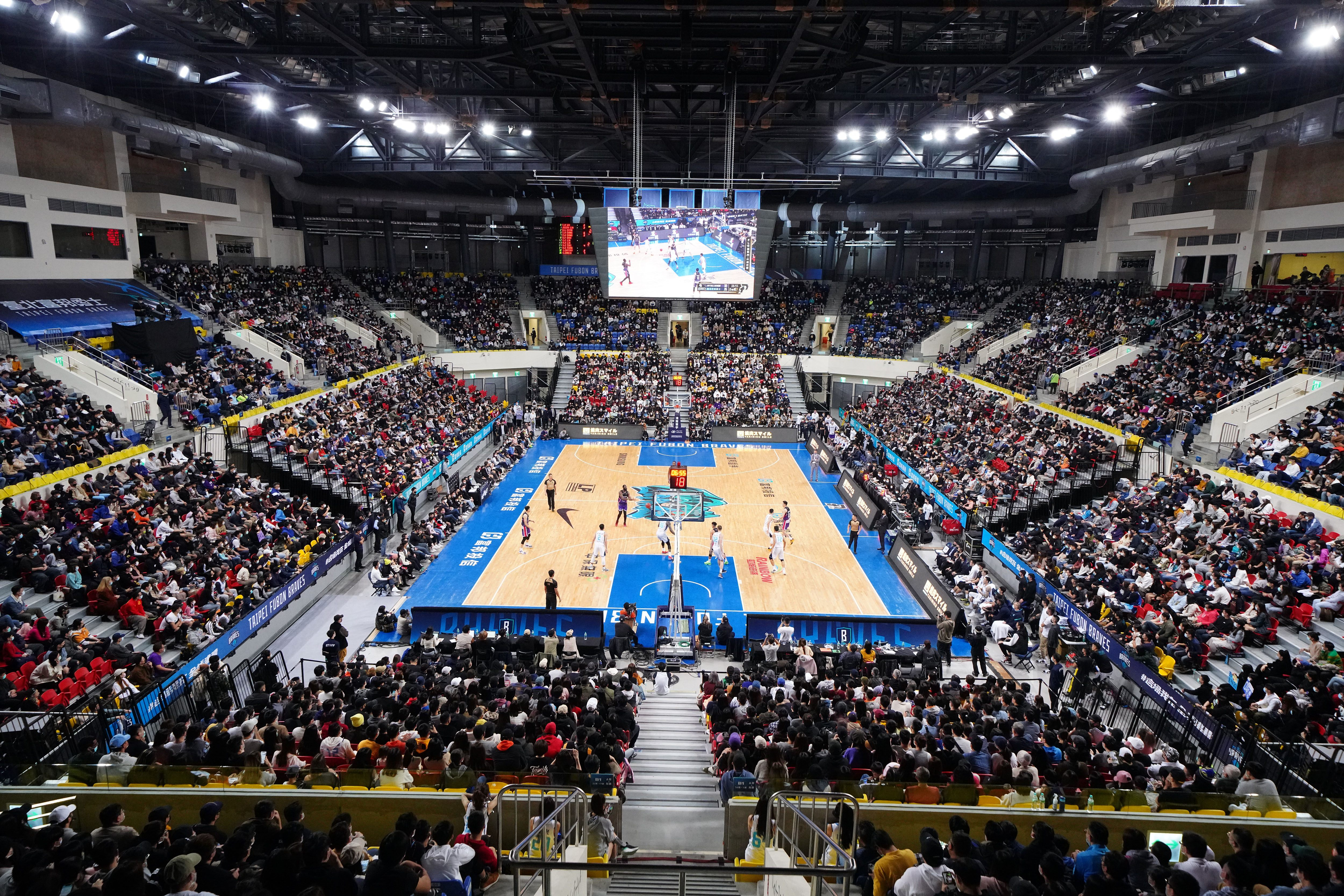
Home game of the Braves in 2021

=== Home arenas ===
Arena	Location	Duration
Taipei Heping Basketball Gymnasium	Taipei City	2019–present

=== Training facilities ===
The Braves' training facility is located at the National Taiwan University of Arts Gymnasium, which is opened on 9 December 2020.

The Braves previously practiced at the Banqiao Civil Sports Center and Shulin Civil Sports Center.

== Roster ==
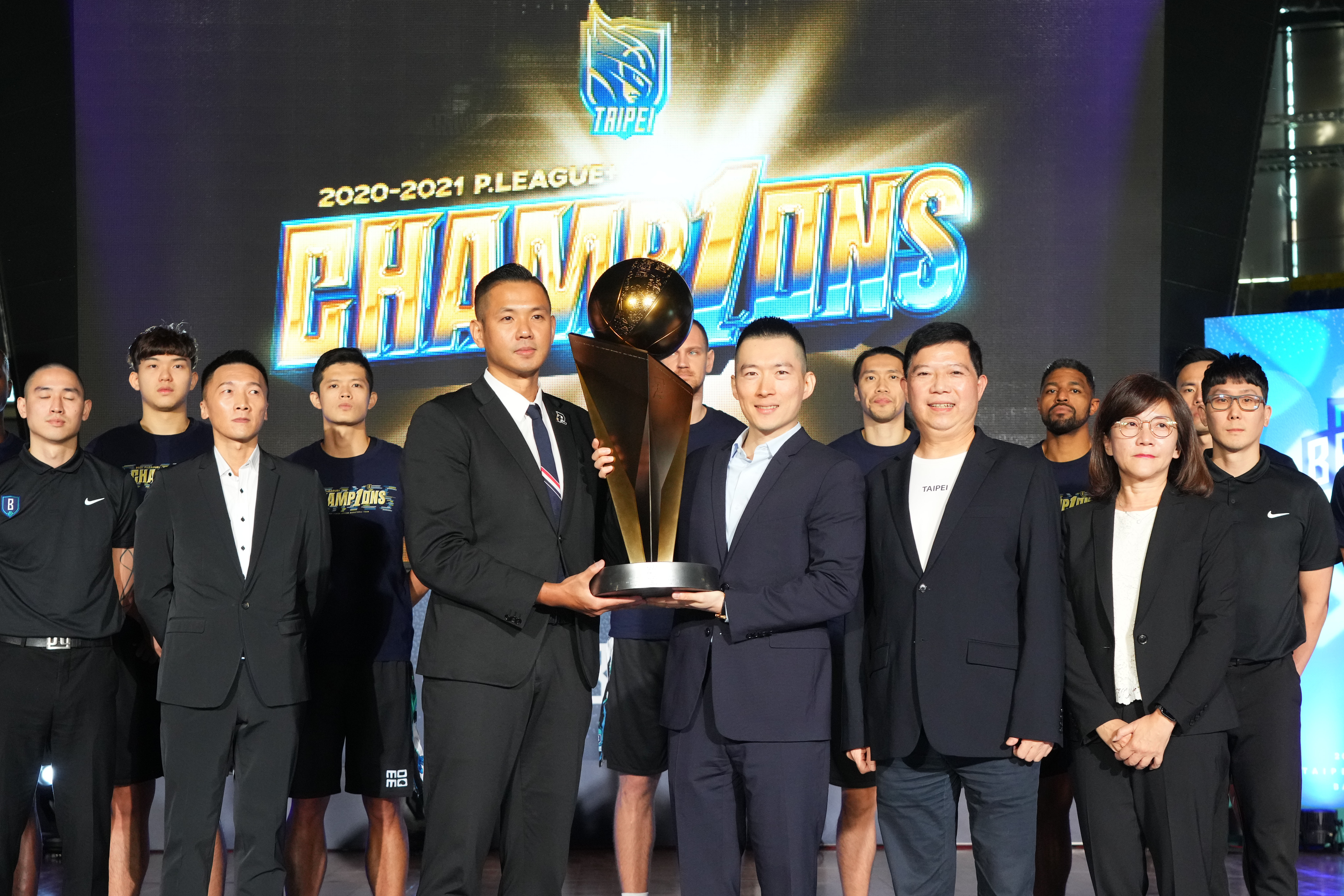
The Braves won the 2020–21 P.League+ championship

=== Current roster ===
Taipei Fubon Braves roster
Players
Coaches

Pos.	No.	Nat.	Name	Ht.	Wt.	Age	From
G	0	(Taiwan)	Lai Ting-En	1.76 m (5 ft 9 in)	70 kg (154 lb)	30 – 22 July 1996	Fu Jen
G	4	(Taiwan)	Chen Yu-Wei	1.83 m (6 ft 0 in)	85 kg (187 lb)	26 – 29 December 1999	NTNU
F	8	(Taiwan)	Chou Kuei-Yu	1.93 m (6 ft 4 in)	95 kg (209 lb)	28 – 19 July 1998	NTNU
G	11	(Taiwan)	Hung Kai-Chieh	1.85 m (6 ft 1 in)	85 kg (187 lb)	28 – 7 October 1998	NCCU
F	12	(Taiwan)	Lin Chih-Chieh	1.92 m (6 ft 4 in)	92 kg (203 lb)	44 – 11 June 1982	Chinese Culture
F	14	(Taiwan)	Tsai Wen-Cheng (C)	1.90 m (6 ft 3 in)	96 kg (212 lb)	41 – 31 May 1985	NCUE
C	18	(Taiwan)	Lin Chih-Wei	2.00 m (6 ft 7 in)	95 kg (209 lb)	34 – 10 July 1992	Chinese Culture
F	27	(Taiwan)	Chang Chen-Ya	1.96 m (6 ft 5 in)	86 kg (190 lb)	27 – 13 October 1999	NCCU
F	00	(Senegal)	Mouhamed Mbaye (FS)	2.05 m (6 ft 9 in)	105 kg (231 lb)	25 – 1 January 2001	NCCU

Head coach

- (Taiwan) Hsu Chin-Che

Assistant coach(es)

- (Taiwan) Wu Yung-Jen
- (Taiwan) Liang Chao-Hsuan
- (Taiwan) Lin Wei-Hao

Strength & conditioning coach(es)

- (Taiwan) Jheng Wei-Syuan

Athletic trainer(s)

- (Taiwan) Lin Wu-Chang
- (Taiwan) Peng Yu-Ming (assistant)

Legend

- (C) Team captain
- (I) Import player
- (FS) Foreign student player
- (HP) Heritage player
- (FA) Free agent
- (DP) Unsigned draft pick
- (AI) EASL Asian import
- (S) Suspended
- Injured

- Roster
Updated: September 1, 2024

== Notable members ==
- Tyler Bey (born 1998), 6'7" - small forward, basketball player in the Israeli Basketball Premier League, former NBA player
- Jet Chang, former NCAA Division II Final Four Most Outstanding Player and played for Minnesota Timberwolves in 2012 NBA Summer League
- Blackie Chen (陳建州) - 6’3", Current Vice-team leader of operations of the team, former forward/centre and National Team Member with Yen Hsing-su
- Li Chih-chiang (李志強) – 5'11", point guard, coach; player in Taiwan in the 1980s.
- Cheng Chih-lung (鄭志龍) – 6'3", coach; former FIBA Asian All-Star, former CBA (Taiwan) finals MVP.
- Chung Chih-mong (鍾枝萌) – 6'5", centre, coach; Chinese Taipei squad head coach at 1998 Asian Games.
- Chen Jih-hsing (陳日興) – 5'11", point guard; player in Taiwan in the 1980s.
- Chou Hai-jung (周海容) – 6'3", shooting guard, coach; player in Taiwan in the 1980s.
- Yen Hsing-su (顏行書) – 6'0", point guard; CBA (Taiwan) assist champion. Head Coach from 2015.
- Chen Hui (陳暉) – 6'0", point guard; SBL assist champion, All-SBL Team.
- Wang Libin (王立彬) – 6'8", centre; CBA (Taiwan) player, one of the only two Asian players to achieve triple-double in the game.
- Joseph Lin, Jeremy Lin's younger brother
- O. J. Mayo, former NBA player
- Earl Barron, NBA Finals Champion of 2006
- Todd Rowe – 6'7", small forward; CBA (Taiwan) regular season MVP, 4-time scoring champions, shot-block champion.
- Song Tao (宋濤) – 6'10", centre; former CBA (Taiwan) player, tallest player in Taiwan's Division A conference when he played for the Mars.
- Tseng Tseng-chiu (曾增球) – 6'3", small forward; player in Taiwan in the 1980s.

== Season-by-season record ==
Chinese Basketball Alliance
Season	Coach	Regular season				Postseason			
Season	Coach	Won	Lost	Win %	Finish	Won	Lost	Win %	Result
1994–95	Alex Tan	13	23	.361	3rd	Not held			
1995–96	Lee Chih-Chiang	24	26	.480	4th	0	3	.000	Lost First Round to Yulon Dinos, 0–3
1996–97	Lee Chih-Chiang	31	29	.517	3rd	0	3	.000	Lost First Round to Hung Kuo Elephants, 0–3
1997–98	Chung Chih-Meng	30	20	.600	2nd	3	4	.429	Lost Finals to Hung Kuo Elephants, 3–4
1998–99	Chung Chih-Meng	15	7	.682	1st	Season unfinished due to the CBA lockout			
Totals		113	105	.518	-	3	10	.231	3 Playoff Appearances

Super Basketball League
Season	Coach	Regular season				Postseason			
Season	Coach	Won	Lost	Win %	Finish	Won	Lost	Win %	Result
2003–04	Chung Chih-Meng	12	12	.500	4th	1	2	.333	Lost Semifinals to Yulon Dinos, 1–2
2004–05	Chung Chih-Meng	18	12	.600	2nd	1	2	.333	Lost Semifinals to Dacin Tigers, 1–2
2005–06	Chou Hai-Jung	13	17	.433	5th	Did not qualify			
2006–07	Liu Chih-Wei	21	9	.700	2nd	4	4	.500	Lost Semifinals to Taiwan Beer, 1–3; Won Third Place vs Yulon Dinos, 3–1
2007–08	Cheng Chih-Lung	9	21	.300	6th	Did not qualify			
2009	Cheng Chih-Lung	9	21	.300	6th	Did not qualify			
2010	Cheng Chih-Lung	15	15	.500	5th	Did not qualify			
2010–11	Cheng Chih-Lung	11	19	.367	6th	Did not qualify			
2011–12	Chia Fan	13	17	.433	6th	Did not qualify			
2012–13	Chia Fan	18	12	.600	3rd	3	4	.429	Lost Semifinals to Taipei Dacin Tigers, 3–4
2013–14	Cheng Chih-Lung	21	9	.700	2nd	5	7	.417	Won Semifinals vs Taiwan Beer, 4–3; Lost Finals to Taichung Pauian Archiland, 1–4
2014–15	Otis Hughley Jr.	19	11	.633	2nd	1	4	.200	Lost Semifinals to Taiwan Beer, 1–4
2015–16	Yen Hsing-Shu	13	17	.433	5th	5	5	.500	Won First Round vs Yulon Luxgen Dinos, 3-1; Lost Semifinals to Pauian Archiland, 2–4
2016–17	Yen Hsing-Shu	17	13	.567	4th	1	3	.250	Lost First Round to Taoyuan Pauian Archiland, 1–3
2017–18	Hsu Chin-Che	15	15	.500	5th	9	6	.600	Won First Round vs Taipei Dacin Tigers, 3–2; Won Semifinals vs Yulon Luxgen Dinos, 4–0; Lost Finals to Taoyuan Pauian Archiland, 2–4
2018–19	Hsu Chin-Che	24	12	.667	1st	8	2	.800	Won Semifinals vs Yulon Luxgen Dinos, 4–2; Won Finals vs Taiwan Beer, 4–0
Totals		248	232	.517	-	38	39	.494	10 Playoff Appearances

ASEAN Basketball League
Season	Coach	Regular season				Postseason			
Season	Coach	Won	Lost	Win %	Finish	Won	Lost	Win %	Result
2019–20	Hsu Chin-Che	9	8	.529	5th	Season suspended due to COVID-19 pandemic			
Totals		9	8	.529	-	0	0	–	0 Playoff Appearances

P. LEAGUE+
Season	Coach	Regular season				Postseason			
Season	Coach	Won	Lost	Win %	Finish	Won	Lost	Win %	Result
2020–21	Hsu Chin-Che	19	5	.792	1st	3	1	.750	Won Finals vs Formosa Taishin Dreamers, 3–1
2021–22	Hsu Chin-Che	18	12	.600	3rd	7	2	.778	Won Playoffs vs Formosa Taishin Dreamers, 3–1; Won Finals vs Hsinchu JKO Lioneers, 4–1
2022–23	Hsu Chin-Che	25	15	.625	2nd	7	2	.778	Won Playoffs vs Taoyuan Pauian Pilots, 3–0; Won Finals vs New Taipei Kings, 4–2
2023–24	Hsu Chin-Che	18	22	.450	5th	Did not qualify			
2024–25	Hsu Chin-Che	15	9	.625	2nd	6	5	.778	Won Playoffs vs TSG GhostHawks, 3–1; Lost Finals vs Taoyuan Pauian Pilots, 3–4
Totals		95	63	.601	-	23	9	.719	4 Playoff Appearances

== See also ==
- ASEAN Basketball League
- Chinese Basketball Alliance
- Super Basketball League
