= Chou Kuei-yu =

Taiwanese professional basketball player

No. 8 – Taipei Fubon Braves
- Position: SF
- League: P. LEAGUE+ ASEAN Basketball League

Personal information
- Born: 19 July 1998 (age 28) Taipei City, Taiwan
- Listed height: 6 ft 4 in (1.93 m)
- Listed weight: 209 lb (95 kg)

Career information
- High school: Taipei Municipal Nanhu Senior High School
- College: National Taiwan Normal University
- Playing career: 2020–present

Career history
- 2020–present: Taipei Fubon Braves

Chou Kuei-yu (Chinese: 周桂羽; born July 19, 1998, in Taipei City, Taiwan) is a Taiwanese professional basketball player for the Taipei Fubon Braves of the P. LEAGUE+ and ASEAN Basketball League.

== Professional career ==
=== Taipei Fubon Braves ===
==== First season ====
On May 26, 2020, Chou was signed with the Taipei Fubon Braves after graduating from National Taiwan Normal University. Chou's debut on January 17, 2020, when Taipei Fubon Braves against Hsinchu JKO Lioneers.

== National team career ==
Chou's first experience with the Chinese Taipei men's national basketball team came at the 2018 William Jones Cup, where he helped team defeat Lithuania for the first time.

== Career statistics ==
=== P. LEAGUE+ ===
==== Regular season ====
Year	Team	Game played	Game started	Minutes per game	FG%	3P%	FT%	RPG	APG	SPG	BPG	PPG
2020-21	Taipei Fubon Braves	6	—N/a	6:38	42.86%	0%	100%	0.83	0.67	0	0.17	1.67

=== College ===
Year	School	Game played	Game started	Minutes per game	FG%	3P%	FT%	RPG	APG	SPG	BPG	PPG
2016-17	NTNU	18	—N/a	—N/a	40.2%	21.1%	64.6%					
2017-18	NTNU	22	—N/a	—N/a	42.9%	25.7%	69.7%					
2018-19	NTNU	24	—N/a	—N/a	51%	38.1%	61.1%					
2019-20	NTNU	13	—N/a	—N/a	54.1%	42.4%	78.6%					
