= Tyler Bey =

American basketball player (born 1998)

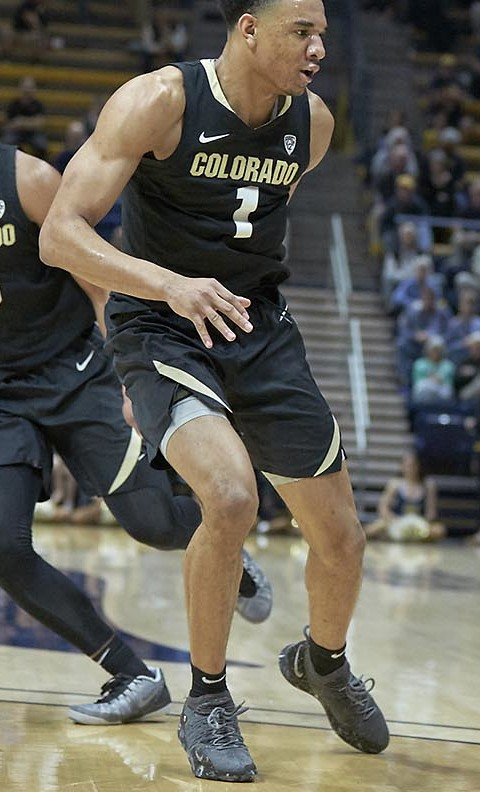
- Bey with Colorado in 2020

No. 1 – Kigali Tigers
- Position: Small forward
- League: BAL; RBL

Personal information
- Born: February 10, 1998 (age 28) Las Vegas, Nevada, U.S.
- Listed height: 6 ft 7 in (2.01 m)
- Listed weight: 215 lb (98 kg)

Career information
- High school: Las Vegas (Sunrise Manor, Nevada); Middlebrooks Academy (Los Angeles, California)
- College: Colorado (2017–2020)
- NBA draft: 2020: 2nd round, 36th overall pick
- Drafted by: Philadelphia 76ers
- Playing career: 2020–present

Career history
- 2020–2021: Dallas Mavericks
- 2021: →Long Island Nets
- 2021: →Salt Lake City Stars
- 2021–2022: Rio Grande Valley Vipers
- 2022–2023: Ironi Ness Ziona
- 2023–2024: Magnolia Hotshots
- 2024: Taipei Fubon Braves
- 2024–2025: Hapoel Haifa
- 2025–2026: Homentemen Beirut
- 2026: Trotamundos de Carabobo
- 2026–present: Kigali Tigers

Career highlights
- NBA G League champion (2022); Israeli League Top Scorer (2023); First-team All-Pac-12 (2019); Second-team All-Pac-12 (2020); Pac-12 Defensive Player of the Year (2020); Pac-12 Most Improved Player (2019)
- Stats at NBA.com
- Stats at Basketball Reference

Tyler Tarik Bey (born February 10, 1998) is an American professional basketball for the Kigali Tigers of the Basketball Africa League (BAL) and the Rwanda Basketball League (RBL). He played college basketball for the Colorado Buffaloes.

== Early life ==
Bey was born and brought up in Las Vegas and started playing competitive basketball in eighth grade. He played for Las Vegas High School in Sunrise Manor, Nevada, where he averaged 17 points, 7.3 rebounds and 1.2 assists per game as a junior. Bey transferred to Middlebrooks Academy, a prep school in Los Angeles, where he attracted more interest from NCAA Division I programs and received scholarship offers from UNLV, San Diego State, Arizona State and Utah. On September 10, 2016, he committed to play college basketball for Colorado. Bey was considered a four-star recruit by 247Sports and Rivals and a three-star recruit by ESPN.

== College career ==
As a freshman, Bey averaged 6.1 points and 5.1 rebounds per game, starting 21 of 32 games. After the season he worked to add a mid-range jumper to his game. After being benched in a game against Oregon State on January 31, 2019, Bey had 11 double-doubles over the final 16 games. He had a career-high 27 points to go with 10 rebounds in a 73–51 win over Oregon on February 3. On February 13, Bey had 22 points and a career-high 17 rebounds as Colorado defeated Arizona State 77–73. In the final week of the regular season, Bey was named Pac 12 player of the week. Bey led the team with 13.6 points and 9.9 rebounds per game as a sophomore. He was named to the First Team All-Pac-12 and became the second Colorado player in four years to win the league's Most Improved Player award.

Bey scored 16 points and had a career-high six steals in a 69–53 win against UC Irvine on November 18. He was named MVP of the Main Event Tournament after averaging 14.5 points per game and leading the Buffaloes to a win over Clemson in the championship. At the conclusion of the regular season, Bey was named Pac-12 Defensive Player of the Year and was selected to the Second Team All-Pac-12. Bey averaged 13.8 points and 9.0 rebounds per game as a junior. After the season, Bey declared for the 2020 NBA draft.

== Professional career ==
=== Dallas Mavericks (2020–2021) ===
Bey was selected 36th overall in the 2020 NBA draft by the Philadelphia 76ers. Shortly after he was traded to the Dallas Mavericks alongside Josh Richardson in exchange for Seth Curry. He was signed on November 30, 2020. His deal was converted to a two-way contract for the season, meaning he would split time with the Mavericks’ NBA G League affiliate, the Texas Legends. On February 2, 2021, it was announced Bey would have his first assignment at the NBA G League, going to the Long Island Nets as the Legends opted out of the G League restart.

=== Rio Grande Valley Vipers (2021–2022) ===
On August 25, 2021, Bey signed with the Houston Rockets but was waived on September 17. Nine days later, he signed a two-way contract with Houston. Under the terms of the deal, he split time between the Rockets and their NBA G League affiliate, the Rio Grande Valley Vipers. He was waived near the end of training camp.

Bey joined the Philadelphia 76ers for the 2022 NBA Summer League.

=== Ironi Ness Ziona (2022–2023) ===
On July 31, 2022, Bey signed with Ironi Ness Ziona of the Israeli Basketball Premier League.

=== Magnolia Hotshots (2023–2024) ===
On August 10, 2023, Bey signed with the Magnolia Hotshots of the Philippine Basketball Association (PBA) as the team's import for the 2023–24 PBA Commissioner's Cup. In 22 games, he averaged 25.8 points (3rd in the league), 13.0 rebounds (4th), 2.3 steals (2nd), and 1.2 blocks (6th) per game.

=== Hapoel Haifa (2024–2025) ===
In August 2024, Bey signed with Hapoel Haifa of the Israeli Basketball Premier League.

=== Homenetmen Beirut (2025–2026) ===
In 2025, Bey signed with Homenetmen Beirut of the Lebanese Basketball League.

== Career statistics ==
Legend
GP	Games played	GS	Games started	MPG	Minutes per game
FG%	Field goal percentage	3P%	3-point field goal percentage	FT%	Free throw percentage
RPG	Rebounds per game	APG	Assists per game	SPG	Steals per game
BPG	Blocks per game	PPG	Points per game	**Bold**	Career high

=== NBA ===
==== Regular season ====
Year	Team	GP	GS	MPG	FG%	3P%	FT%	RPG	APG	SPG	BPG	PPG
2020–21	Dallas	18	0	3.9	.318	.250	.600	1.1	.2	.0	.1	1.0
Career		18	0	3.9	.318	.250	.600	1.1	.2	.0	.1	1.0

=== College ===
Year	Team	GP	GS	MPG	FG%	3P%	FT%	RPG	APG	SPG	BPG	PPG
2017–18	Colorado	32	21	19.7	.503	.000	.685	5.1	.5	.6	.7	6.1
2018–19	Colorado	**36**	**36**	26.3	**.541**	.227	**.782**	**9.9**	.6	.8	**1.2**	13.6
2019–20	Colorado	31	30	**29.0**	.530	**.419**	.743	9.0	**1.5**	**1.5**	**1.2**	**13.8**
Career		99	87	25.0	.530	.305	.747	8.1	.9	1.0	1.0	11.2
