= Lin Chih-chieh =

Taiwanese basketball player (born 1982)

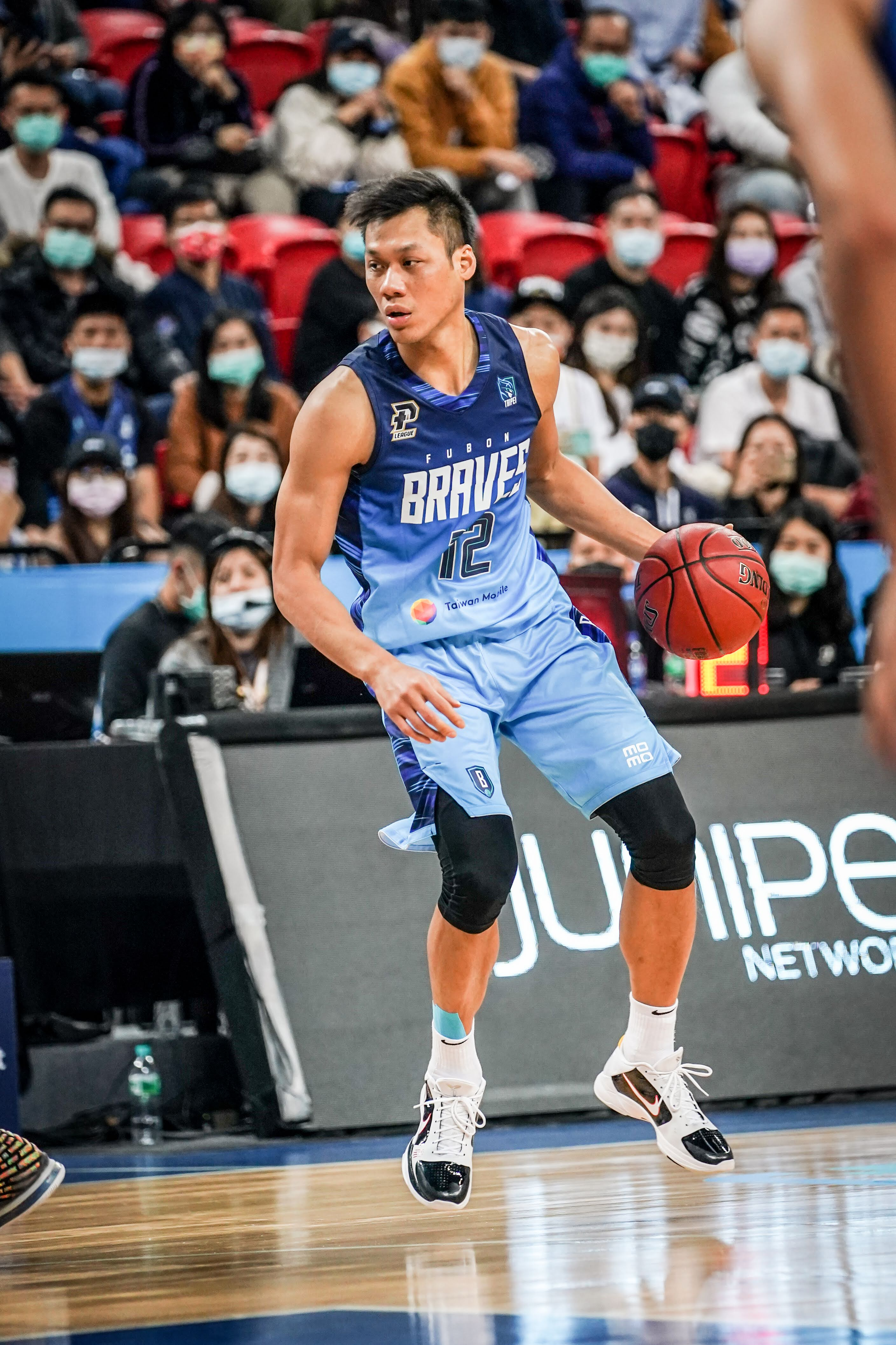

No. 12 – Taipei Fubon Braves
- Position: Shooting guard
- League: P. LEAGUE+

Personal information
- Born: 11 June 1982 (age 44) Hualien County, Taiwan
- Listed height: 6 ft 3 1/2 in (1.92 m)
- Listed weight: 200 lb (91 kg)

Career information
- High school: National Keelung Senior Marine Vocational School (Keelung, Taiwan)
- College: Chinese Culture University
- Playing career: 2000–present

Career history
- 2001–2009: Taiwan Beer
- 2009–2019: Zhejiang Guangsha
- 2010: South China
- 2019–present: Taipei Fubon Braves

Career highlights
- 3× P. League+ champion (2021–2023); 4× P. League+ Mr. Popular (2021–2024); 2× P. League+ Second Team (2022, 2024); 2× CBA Skills Challenge champion (2010, 2011); 6× CBA All-Star (2010, 2011, 2013–2017)
Medals
Men's basketball
Representing Chinese Taipei
FIBA Asia Challenge
Bronze medal – third place	2004 Taipei
East Asian Games
Silver medal – second place	2009 Hong Kong
Gold medal – first place	2013 Tianjin
ABC Under-18 Championship
Bronze medal – third place	2000 Kuala Lumpur

Lin Chih-chieh (Chinese: 林志傑; pinyin: Lín Zhìjié; Wade–Giles: Lin Chih-chieh; born 11 June 1982 in Hualien County, Taiwan) is a Taiwanese professional basketball player of Amis descent. During his career with the Taiwan Beer club of the Super Basketball League (SBL), Lin has won one Regular Season most valuable player (MVP) award, two back-to-back Championship Series MVP awards, and two scoring champion titles. Dubbed "The Beast" (野獸) by local media, Lin is renowned for his ability to boost his team's morale by making sensational plays and is among the most beloved basketball players in Taiwan.

Despite being undersized playing the forward position in international tournaments, Lin often starts for the Chinese Taipei national basketball team in place of injury-prone Chen Hsin-an and, at times, is an important scorer.

In September 2009, Lin signed a two-year contract with the Zhejiang Lions in the Chinese Basketball Association (CBA) for a monthly salary of $15,000. In Zhejiang, Lin started at shooting guard during the 2009-2010 season. After helping Zhejiang advance to the second round of the CBA playoffs where the team was eliminated, Lin was allowed to return and play for Taiwan Beer, helping them in the SBL postseason where they were ultimately defeated by the defending champion Dacin Tigers.

== The nick name "BEAST" ==
During his season in SBL, because of his outstanding jumping ability and his explosiveness, he often creates incredible plays that excites the audience. Therefore the SBL sport commentators usually described him as a monster after he made such incredible plays. His own unique street playing style also earned the credit of his nickname. The nickname "BEAST" also represents that nobody could stop him from scoring.

== Personal life ==
Lin Chih-Chieh started playing basketball since he was little. During his years in middle school, he was only 159 centimeter tall and so got rejected to the basketball team. In his grade 9 year, he grew up to 180 centimeter and finally got into the team.

Lin Chih-Chieh used to play pick ups basketball at the park that near his house, and so he got his street playing style that differs from him to other players.

After graduated from his middle school, he got to play in the top division basketball team in National Keelung Maritime Vocational High School. The team broke up during his second year, and plus he didn't play much during his rookie season, therefore he did not earn much experience in his high school career.

Unlike other future star high school players, he did not have good basketball background based on his high school career. In 2000, He went to tryout for the U-18 national team anyway and successfully got into the team.

After graduated in high school, he got in to Chinese Culture University. And during his second year, he joined the Taiwan Beer club of the Super Basketball League (SBL).

== Professional career ==
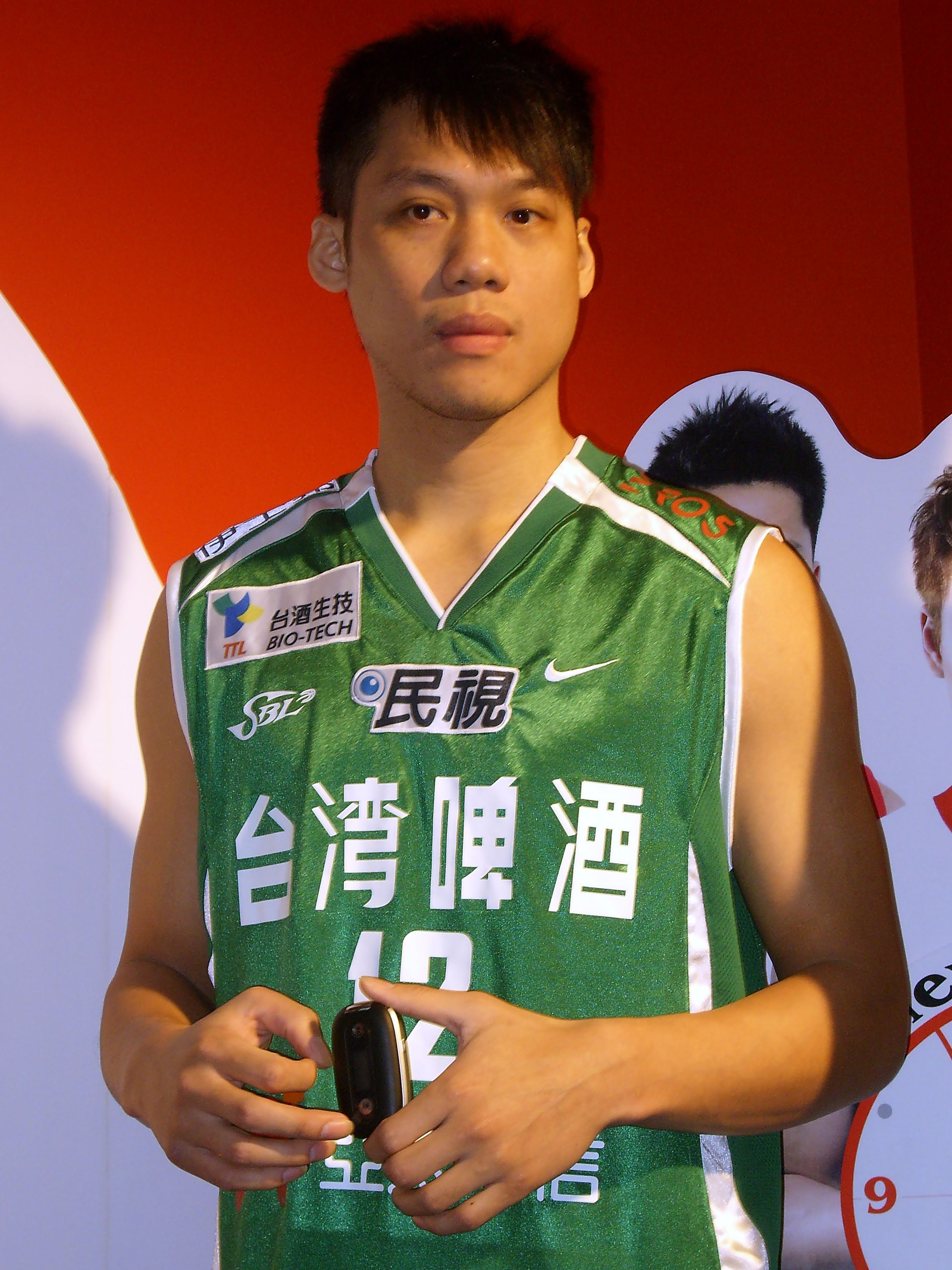
Lin Chih-Chieh with the SBL Taiwan Beer team Jersey on

=== SBL ===
==== First season ====
during Lin Chih-Chieh's 2003-2004 season in SBL, He set the record of 9 three pointers in a game. In November 30, 2003, during the game vs. Bank of Taiwan (basketball), 5 minutes and 42 seconds left in the second quarter, as soon as Lin Chih-Chieh finished with the one handed dunk in the fast break, the basket broke down to the ground due to his power on the dunk, which wrote down the history of being the first person who broke down the basket by the powerful dunk.

His team finished in 6th place.

Lin Chih-Chieh won scoring title.

==== Second season ====
2004－2005

His team finished in 6th place.

Lin Chih-Chieh won scoring title.

==== Third season ====
2005－2006

During the game in April 16, Lin Chih-Chieh sprained his left ankle and didn't play the game vs Dacin Tigers in 22nd. Without him, the team lost by 23 points. After, Lin Chih-Chieh led the team with 2 wins and got in to the championship to play against Yulon Dinos.

Taiwan Beer finished off in 2nd place.

Lin Chih-Chieh won All-SBL team.

==== Fourth Season ====
2006－2007

Taiwan Beer won the championship.

Lin Chih-Chieh won All-SBL team, season MVP, and also final MVP.

==== Fifth season ====
2007-2008

Taiwan Beer won the championship.

Lin Chih-Chieh won the SBL Finals MVP.

==== Sixth season ====
2008-2009

Taiwan Beer finished in 2nd place.

=== CBA ===
During September 2009, Lin Chih-Chieh has declared his transfer and join Zhejiang Lions in Chinese Basketball Association. Lin Chih-Chieh played for Zhejiang Lions for 10 years. On April 2 of 2019, Zhejiang Lions lost the series 1-3 to Xinjiang Flying Tigers, and this game marked as the last game for Lin Chih-Chieh playing for Zhejiang Lions.

=== ABL / P. LEAGUE+ ===
On August 15, 2019, Lin Chih-chieh declared that he would join Taipei Fubon Braves. He announced in October 2025 that the 2025-26 season would be his last as a player.

=== SBL Statistics ===
year	team	game	start	minute	FG	3-point	free-throw	rebound	assist	block	steal	turnover	foul	point
03－04	Taiwan Beer	24	24	36.9mins	38.4%	33.1%	69.7%	6.5	3.1	0.3	1.4	3.6	2.1	24.5
04－05	Taiwan Beer	30	30	35.3mins	42.1%	35.6%	63.4%	7.5	2.3	0.8	1.7	3.3	2.4	22.8
05－06	Taiwan Beer	30	30	33.8mins	44.7%	34.1%	79.1%	6.2	3.2	0.4	1.5	3.1	2.2	24.7
06－07	Taiwan Beer	30	30	34.1mins	47.6%	38.3%	66.0%	7.6	3.7	0.4	0.7	3.4	2.5	21.6
07－08	Taiwan Beer	30	27	31.16mins	42.1%	33.9%	62.9%	6.6	3.5	0.2	1.2	3.9	2.2	15.0
SBL Career	Taiwan Beer	137	134	34.3mins	43.0%	34.9%	69.1%	7.0	3.2	0.4	1.3	3.5	2.3	21.9

== Sources ==
- 台灣啤酒籃球隊官方網站
- 台灣啤酒籃球隊影音記錄
- 蕃薯藤-SBL超級籃球聯賽
