= National Changhua University of Education =

University in Changhua, Taiwan

- 國立彰化師範大學
- Motto: 新本精行
- Type: National Public
- Established: 1971
- Affiliations: National University System of Taiwan
- President: Chen, Ming-Fei
- Academic staff: 564 (392 full-time)
- Students: 8,235 (2017)
- Undergraduates: 4,895 (2017)
- Postgraduates: 3,340 (2017)
- Location: Changhua City, Changhua County, Taiwan; 24.0826°N 120.5584°E
- Campus: Urban, rural
- Website: Official website

National Changhua University of Education
- Traditional Chinese: 國立彰化師範大學
- Simplified Chinese: 国立彰化师范大学
Transcriptions
Standard Mandarin
- Hanyu Pinyin: Guólì Zhānghuà Shīfàn Dàxué

The National Changhua University of Education (NCUE; Chinese: 國立彰化師範大學) is a normal university in Changhua City, Changhua County, Taiwan.

The university offers a variety of undergraduate and graduate programs in education, liberal arts, science, engineering, and management.

It also has a Center for Teacher Education and Professional Development, which is responsible for training and certifying future teachers.

== History ==
NCUE was initially established in 1745 as Baisha Academy.

In August 1971, it was renamed to Taiwan Provincial College of Education. In 1980, it was renamed to National Taiwan College of Education. In August 1989, it was renamed again to become National Changhua University of Education.

== Academic Rankings ==
National Changhua University of Education rankings

Global – Overall
- CWUR World: 1892 (2022)
- THE World: 1501+ (2023)

Regional – Overall
- QS Asia: 621-640 (2025)
- THE Asia: 501–600 (2023)

National – Overall
- CWUR National: 34 (2022)
- THE National: 30–43 (2023)

== Campus ==
NCUE has two campuses, Jin-De and Bao-Shan, both located in Changhua.

== Organization ==
NCUE comprises seven colleges: Arts, Education, Engineering, Management, Science, Sports, and Technology and Vocational Education.

== Transportation ==
The university is accessible east of Changhua Station of Taiwan Railway.

== Gallery ==
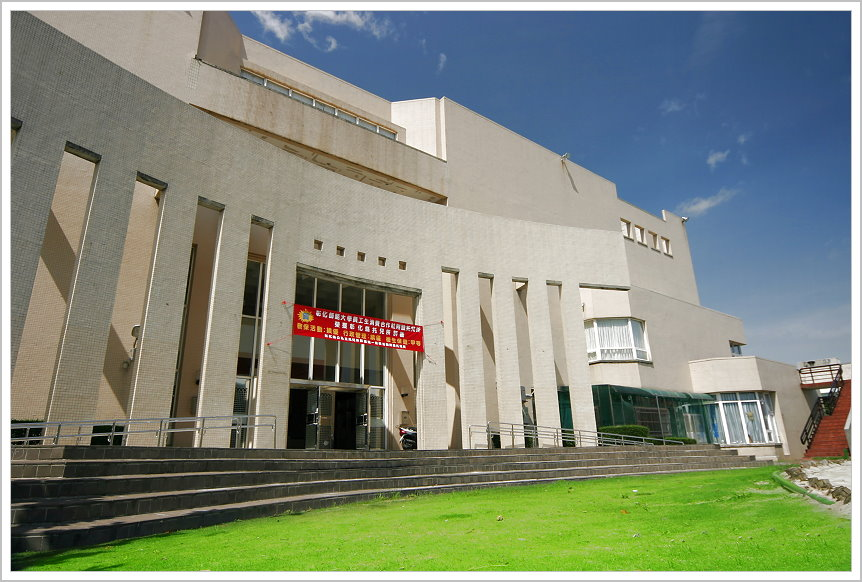
Jin-De Campus Comprehensive center

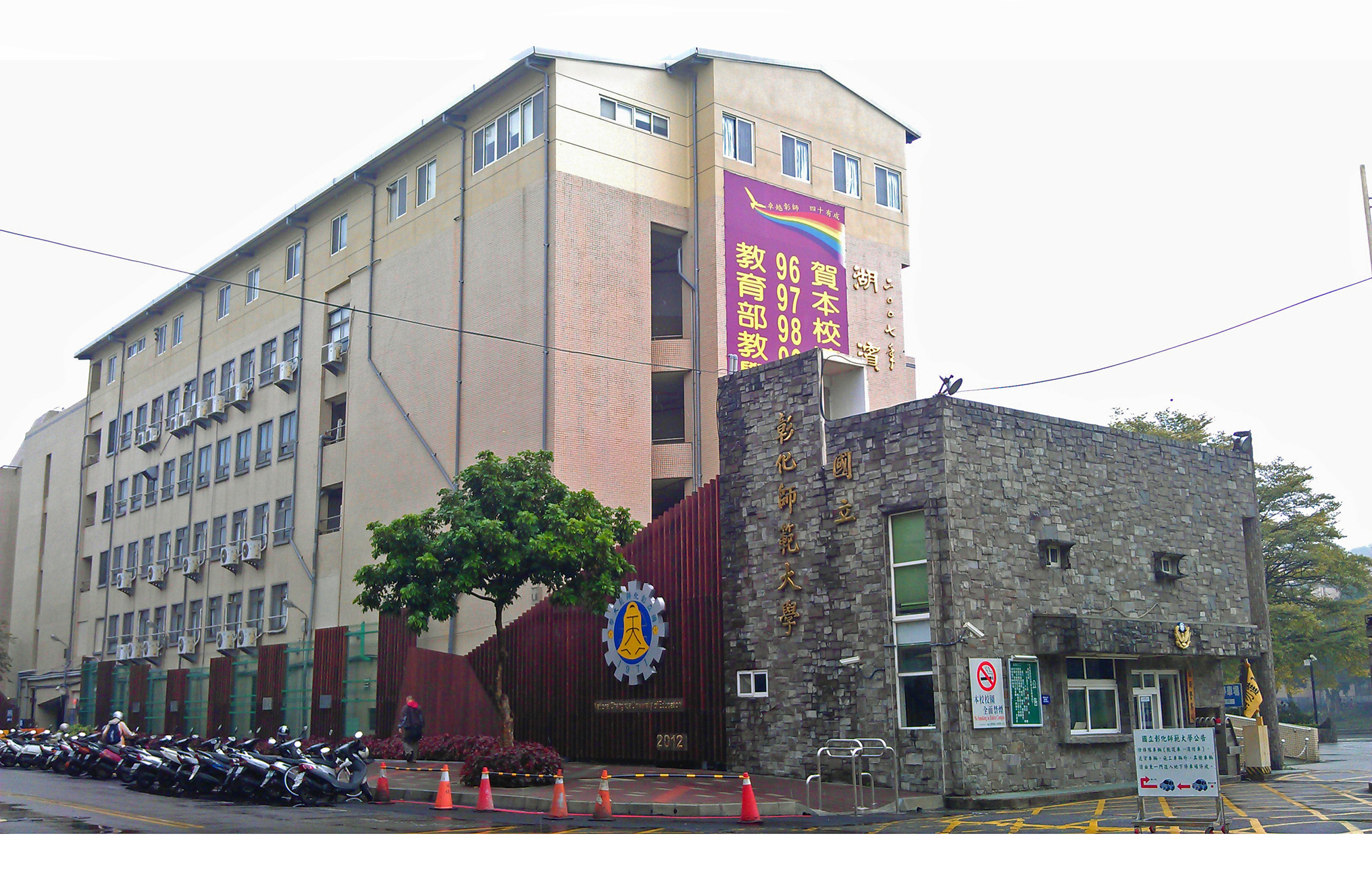
Jin-De Campus gate

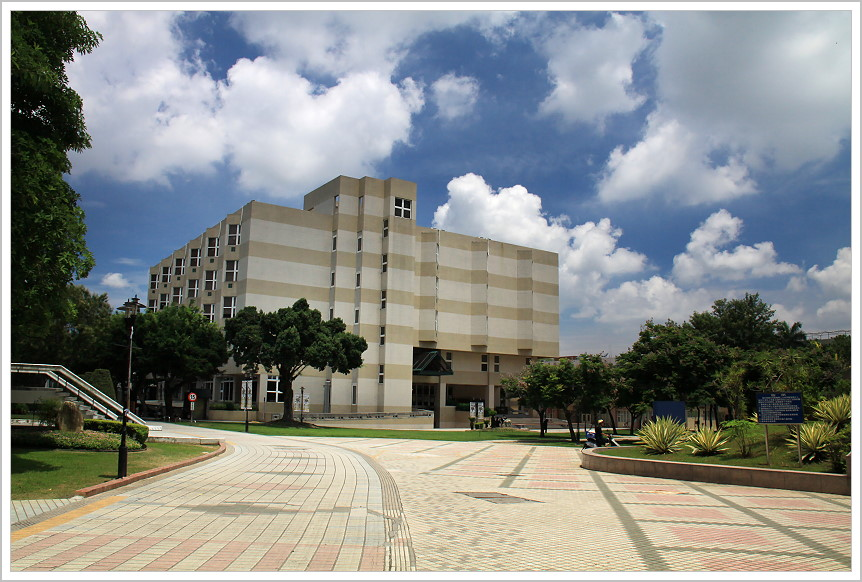
NCUE Library

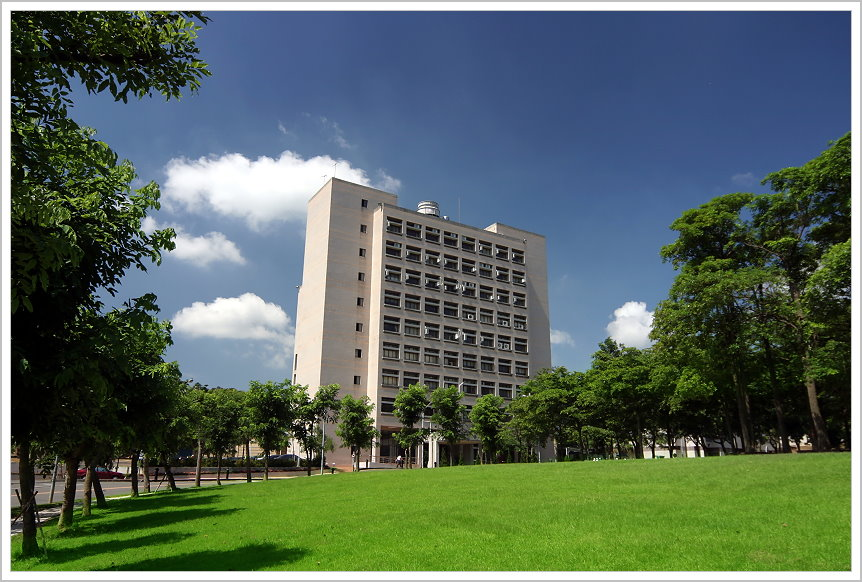
Bao-Shan campus Jingshi Building

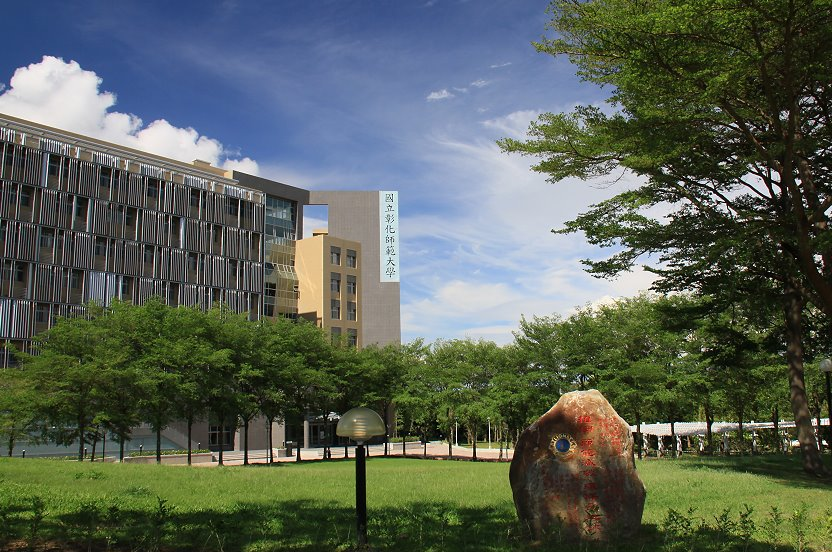
Bao-Shan campus College of Engineering Building

== See also ==
- List of universities in Taiwan
- Education in Taiwan
