= 2026–27 PLG season =

- League: P. League+
- Sport: Basketball
- Games: 24
- Teams: 4
- TV partner(s): FTV One, MOMOTV

Draft
- Top draft pick: Wang Ting-Chun
- Picked by: Yankey Engineering

Regular season

Playoffs

Finals

P. League+ seasons
- ← 2025–26 2027–28 →

The 2026–27 PLG season was the 7th season of the P. League+ (PLG).

== Teams overview ==
Club	Location	Head coach	Home stadium
Taipei Fubon Braves	Taipei	(Chinese Taipei) Wu Yong-ren	Taipei Heping Basketball Gymnasium
Taoyuan Pauian Pilots	Taoyuan	(Spain) Iurgi Caminos	Taoyuan Arena (until Dec 25); Banqiao Arena (from Jan 26 to Mar 26)
TSG GhostHawks	Tainan	(Austria) Raoul Korner	National Cheng Kung University
Yankey Ark	Hsinchu	(Chinese Taipei) Lee Yi-hua	Hsinchu Municipal Gymnasium

== Draft results ==
G	Guard	F	Forward	C	Center

Draft round	Pick	Player	Position	Team	School / club team
1	1	Wang Ting-Chun	G	Yankey Ark	Shin Hsin University
1	2	Li Sheng-Hsin	F	TSG GhostHawks	Fu Jen Catholic University
1	3	(Iran) Mohsen Asgari Nia	C	Taipei Fubon Braves	Fu Jen Catholic University
1	4	Wu Zhi-Kai	G	Taoyuan Pauian Pilots	National Chengchi University

== Transactions ==
Key contract extensions are as follows:

Date	Player	Team	Remarks	Reference
3 July 2026	Lin Chih-Wei	Yankey Ark	1 year extension	
14 July 2026	Ethan Chung	TSG GhostHawks	1 year extension	
20 July 2026	Kao Wei-lun	Yankey Ark	1 year extension	
20 July 2026	Lu Kuan-ting	Yankey Ark	1 year extension	
29 July 2026	Hung Kai-Chieh	Taipei Fubon Braves	Multi years extension	
30 July 2026	(United States) De'Mon Brooks	TSG GhostHawks	1 year extension	
31 July 2026	(United States) Jamarcus Mearidy	Yankey Ark	1 year extension	
31 July 2026	(The Gambia) Joof Alasan	Yankey Ark	1 year extension	
1 August 2026	(Senegal) Mouhamed Mbaye	Taipei Fubon Braves	1 year extension	
20 August 2026	(Senegal) Amdy Dieng	Taoyuan Pauian Pilots	Multi years extension	
20 September 2026	(United States) Michael Holyfield	Taipei Fubon Braves	1 year extension	

Key trade transactions are as follows:

Trades

Key free agents movements are as follows:

Date	Player	Old team	New team	Reference
18 June 2026	(Lithuania) Benas Griciunas	TSG GhostHawks		
18 June 2026	(United States) Ray McCallum	TSG GhostHawks		
18 June 2026	(Canada) Fardaws Aimaq	TSG GhostHawks	(Japan) Kobe Storks	
19 June 2026	Lin Chih-chieh	Taipei Fubon Braves	Retired	
28 June 2026	Lee Yun-chieh	TSG GhostHawks	Bank of Taiwan (SBL)	
1 July 2026	Chen Li-Sheng	Taoyuan Pauian Pilots	Hsinchu Toplus Lioneers	
2 July 2026	Wang Lu-hsiang	TSG GhostHawks	Hsinchu Toplus Lioneers (TPBL)	
3 July 2026	(Nigeria) Humphery Gabriel	TSG GhostHawks	Taiwan Beer (SBL)	
8 July 2026	(United States) Archie Goodwin	Taipei Fubon Braves	(South Korea) Changwon LG Sakers	
8 July 2026	Chien Chia-wei	Bank of Taiwan (SBL)	Yankey Ark	
9 July 2026	Liu Jen-hao	Yankey Ark		
20 July 2026	(United States) Mike Singletary	Taipei Fubon Braves	Retired	
22 July 2026	Su Pei-kai	New Taipei Kings (TPBL)	TSG GhostHawks	
22 July 2026	(United States) (Taiwan) Will Artino	Taoyuan Pauian Pilots	(Japan) Rizing Zephyr Fukuoka	
24 July 2026	(United States) Cameron McGriff	Yankey Ark	MoraBanc Andorra	
28 July 2026	Lee Chi-wei	Hsinchu Toplus Lioneers (TPBL)	Taipei Fubon Braves	
28 July 2026	Chuang Chao-Sheng	Yankey Ark		
28 July 2026	Kuo Shao-chieh	TSG GhostHawks		
31 July 2026	Qiao Chu-yu	Taoyuan Pauian Pilots	Retired	
4 August 2026	Wu Yongsheng	Taipei Fubon Braves	Taipei Taishin Mars (TPBL)	
6 August 2026	Chen Yu-Jui	Yankey Ark	Taoyuan Pauian Pilots	
11 August 2026	(United States) Jordan Caroline	(Lithuania) BC Rytas	TSG GhostHawks	
11 August 2026	(Liberia) (United States) Lasan Kromah	Taoyuan Taiwan Beer Leopards (TPBL)	Taipei Fubon Braves	
12 August 2026	Chen Kuan-chung	(China) Jilin Northeast Tigers	Taipei Fubon Braves	
14 August 2026	Chang Po-wei	Yankey Ark		
14 August 2026	Caleb Chang	Yankey Ark	Taiwan Beer (SBL)	
14 August 2026	Tsai Wen-cheng	Taipei Fubon Braves	Retired	
18 August 2026	(Czech Republic) Ondřej Balvín	Hong Kong Bulls	TSG GhostHawks	
18 August 2026	(United States) Jamorko Pickett	(Japan) Fighting Eagles Nagoya	Taipei Fubon Braves	
19 August 2026	(Montenegro) Marko Todorović	New Taipei CTBC DEA (TPBL)	Taipei Fubon Braves	
24 August 2026	Lin Bing-Sheng	(China) Zhejiang Guangsha	Yankey Ark	
25 August 2026	(Iran) (England) Aaron Geramipoor	(Malaysia) Johor Southern Tigers	TSG GhostHawks	
26 August 2026	Lee Chia-jul	Hsinchu Toplus Lioneers (TPBL)	Yankey Ark	
1 September 2026	(United States) Dewan Hernandez	(South Korea) Busan KCC Egis	Taoyuan Pauian Pilots	
2 September 2026	(United States) Morris Udeze	(Spain) BC Andorra	Yankey Ark	
3 September 2026	Oscar Kao Kuo-hao	Hsinchu Toplus Lioneers (TPBL)	TSG GhostHawks	
8 September 2026	(Lithuania) Mindaugas Kupšas	Yankey Ark	(Hong Kong) Eagles Basketball	
9 September 2026	(United States) Victor Hart	(Japan) Shinagawa City	Yankey Ark	
11 September 2026	(United States) Javan Johnson	(Canada) Scarborough Shooting Stars	Taoyuan Pauian Pilots	
16 September 2026	(Ukraine) Artem Kovalov	Yankey Ark	(Azerbaijan) Ordu IK	
17 September 2026	(United States) Treveon Graham	Taoyuan Pauian Pilots	(Mongolia) Sono Brothers	
20 September 2026	(Serbia) (Canada) Stefan Janković	Taipei Fubon Braves	Kuwait SC	
22 September 2026	(United States) Trevor Thompson	(China) Hangzhou Jingwei	Yankey Ark	
30 September 2026	(United States) (Taiwan) Myles Che	(United States) UC Irvine	Taipei Fubon Braves	
8 October 2026	(United Kingdom) (Brunei) Marcus Quirk	Yankey Ark		
30 October 2026	(Serbia) (Canada) Stefan Janković	(Iran) Shahrdari Gorgan	Yankey Ark	
20 November 2026	(United States) Javan Johnson	Taoyuan Pauian Pilots		
20 November 2026	Liu Cheng-Yen	Changhua Pauian BLL (SBL)	Taoyuan Pauian Pilots	

== Imports, foreign students, and heritage players ==
Club	Imports	Foreign students (Note: Team can either register a total of three heritage players and foreign students combined, but not more than one heritage player.)	Heritage players (Note: Heritage player refers to a player who is of Taiwanese descent but does not meet the FIBA eligibility rules to be local.)	Released players
Taipei Fubon Braves	(United States) Michael Holyfield (Liberia) (United States) Lasan Kromah (United States) Jamorko Pickett (Montenegro) Marko Todorović	(Senegal) Mouhamed Mbaye (United States) Jonathan Nchekwube (Iran) Mohsen Asgari Nia	(United States) Myles Che (United States) Spencer Lin	
Taoyuan Pauian Pilots	(United States) Alec Brown (United States) Dewan Hernandez (United States) Setric Millner Jr. (United States) Chris Smith	(Senegal) Amdy Dieng		(United States) Javan Johnson
TSG GhostHawks	(United States) De'Mon Brooks (United States) Jordan Caroline (Czech Republic) Ondřej Balvín (Iran) (England) Aaron Geramipoor	(Mongolia) Bayasgalan Delgerchuluun (Nigeria) Oli Daniel	(United States) Ethan Chung	
Yankey Ark	(United States) Morris Udeze (United States) Trevor Thompson (United States) Victor Hart (Serbia) (Canada) Stefan Janković	(The Gambia) Joof Alasan (United States) Jamarcus Mearidy		

== Preseason ==
The Preseason will take place on October 12 and 13, 2024.

== Regular season ==
Pos	Team	W	L	PCT	GB	Qualification
1	Taipei Fubon Braves	3	0	1.000	—	Final
2	Tainan TSG GhostHawks	3	2	.600	1	Advance to Playoff
3	Yankey Ark	0	1	.000	2	Advance to Playoff
4	Taoyuan Pauian Pilots	0	3	.000	3	

Updated to match(es) played on 21 Nov 26. Source: P.League+

=== Results summary ===
Home \ Away	YKE	TSG	TFB	TPP
Yankey		-	-	-
Yankey		-	-	-
Yankey		-	-	-
Yankey		-	-	-
GhostHawks	104–99		85–104	115–94
GhostHawks	-		-	97–94
GhostHawks	-		-	-
GhostHawks	-		-	-
Braves	-	109–78		113–81
Braves	-	-		-
Braves	-	-		-
Braves	-	-		-
Pilots	-	79–105	-	
Pilots	-	-	-	
Pilots	-	-	-	
Pilots	-	-	-	

Updated to match(es) played on 22 Nov 26. Source: / P.League+
Legend: Blue = home team win; Red = away team win.
For upcoming matches, an "a" indicates there is an article about the rivalry between the two participants.
Matches with lighter background shading were decided after overtime.

== Playoffs ==
Playoffs	Finals
	1
2	2
3

Bold Series winner
Italic Team with home-court advantage

== Media ==
The games will be aired on television via FTV One and MOMOTV, and will be broadcast online on YouTube official channel and 4GTV.
