= 2025–26 PLG season =

- League: P. League+
- Sport: Basketball
- Games: 24
- Teams: 4
- TV partner(s): FTV One, MOMOTV

Draft
- Top draft pick: Warren Yeh
- Picked by: Yankey Engineering

Regular season

Playoffs

Finals

P. League+ seasons
- ← 2024–25 2026–27 →

The 2025–26 PLG season was the 6th season of the P. League+ (PLG).

== Notable occurrences ==
- Taoyuan Pauian Pilots, Taipei Fubon Braves qualify for the 2025-2026 EASL as they are the top 2 team in the previous season.
- On 16 July 2025, P. League+ and TPBL announced the cooperation for 7+3 teams playing in 2025–26 season.
- On 25 July 2025, the cooperation between P. League+ and TPBL is cancelled, and the TPBL only discussed with P. League+ for league merging.
- On 31 July 2025, the TPBL stopped the discussion with P. League+ for league merging, and started to prepare for the 2025–26 season.
- On 21 August 2025, PLG announced that a new franchisee, Yankey Engineering will be joining the league, replacing Kaohsiung Steelers who will exit of the league as the team is dissolved.

== Teams Overview ==
Club	Location	Head coach	Home stadium
Taipei Fubon Braves	Taipei	(Chinese Taipei) Wu Yong-ren	Taipei Heping Basketball Gymnasium
Taoyuan Pauian Pilots	Taoyuan	(Spain) Iurgi Caminos	Taoyuan Arena (till Dec-25); Banqiao Arena (from Jan-26 to Mar-26)
TSG GhostHawks	Tainan	(Austria) Raoul Korner	National Cheng Kung University
Yankey Ark	Hsinchu	(Chinese Taipei) Lee Yi-hua	Hsinchu Municipal Gymnasium

== Draft results ==
G	Guard	F	Forward	C	Center

Draft Round	Pick	Player	Position	Team	School / Club team
1	1	Warren Yeh	G	Yankey Ark	Alabama A&M University
1	2	Lin Yu-Chien	G/F	TSG GhostHawks	Blue Mountain Christian University
1	3	(United States) Jonathan Nchekwube	F/C	Taipei Fubon Braves	National Formosa University
2	4	Caleb Chiang	G	Yankey Ark	Bellevue University

== Transactions ==
Key contract extension as follow:

Date	Player	Team	Remarks	Reference
5 March 2025	Lin Cheng	Taoyuan Pauian Pilots	5 years extension	
23 March 2025	Lin Chih-Chieh	Taipei Fubon Braves	1 year extension	
1 April 2025	Pai Yao-Cheng	Taoyuan Pauian Pilots	4 years extension	
23 May 2025	(United States) De'Mon Brooks	TSG GhostHawks	1 year extension	
1 July 2025	(United States) Alec Brown	Taoyuan Pauian Pilots	2 years extension	
23 July 2025	Hsieh Zong-Rong	TSG GhostHawks	5 years extension	
29 August 2025	Lin Tzu-Wei	Taoyuan Pauian Pilots	2+1 years extension	
29 August 2025	(United States) Treveon Graham	Taoyuan Pauian Pilots	1 year extension	

Key trade transactions as follow:

Trades
11 July 2025	To TSG GhostHawks: Wang Lu-Hsiang	To Taipei Taishin Mars (TPBL): Cash Consideration
15 July 2025	To TSG GhostHawks: Chuang Chao-Sheng	To Kaohsiung Steelers: Cash Consideration
22 September 2025	To Yankey Ark: Lu Kuan-Ting Chuang Chao-Sheng	To TSG GhostHawks: Cash Consideration
22 September 2025	To Yankey Ark: Lin Chih-Wei Chang Chen-Ya	To Taipei Fubon Braves: Cash Consideration
22 September 2025	To Yankey Ark: Chen Yu-Jui	To Taoyuan Pauian Pilots: Cash Consideration

Key Free Agents Movements as follow:

Date	Player	Old Team	New Team	Reference
23 May 2025	Han Chieh-Yu	TSG GhostHawks	Bank of Taiwan (SBL)	
23 May 2025	Liu Chun-Ting	TSG GhostHawks	Yulon (SBL)	
23 May 2025	Wu Tai-Hao	TSG GhostHawks	Yulon (SBL)	
23 May 2025	Chang Po-Sheng	TSG GhostHawks		
23 May 2025	(Lithuania) Žiga Dimec	TSG GhostHawks	(Slovenia) Borac Čačak	
23 May 2025	(United States) Branden Frazier	TSG GhostHawks	(Liberia) Al Ahly Ly	
23 May 2025	(United States) Nick Perkins	TSG GhostHawks	(Puerto Rico) Indios	
27 May 2025	(United States) Jeff Withey	Taipei Fubon Braves	(Indonesia) Pelita Jaya Jakarta	
9 June 2025	(United States) Brandon Walters	Taipei Fubon Braves	(Turkey) TED Ankara	
9 June 2025	(United States) Jabari Birds	Taipei Fubon Braves		
9 June 2025	(United States) Nick King	Taipei Fubon Braves		
13 June 2025	(United States) (Hungary) Jarrod Jones	Taoyuan Pauian Pilots		
30 June 2025	Jian Ting-Jhao	Taipei Fubon Braves	New Taipei CTBC DEA (TPBL)	
18 July 2025	Chen Fan Po-Yen	Kaohsiung Steelers	TSG GhostHawks	
22 July 2025	(United States) Tobin Carberry	(Greece) Peristeri	TSG GhostHawks	
30 July 2025	Tsai Chen-yueh	Taipei Fubon Braves		
15 August 2025	(United States) Julian Boyd	Taoyuan Pauian Pilots		
20 August 2025	Tseng Hsiang-chun	(Japan) Fighting Eagles Nagoya	Taipei Fubon Braves	
21 August 2025	Liu Yen-Ting	Kaohsiung Steelers	Taipei Taishin Mars (TPBL)	
21 August 2025	(Canada) Jordy Tshimanga	Kaohsiung Steelers	Taipei Taishin Mars (TPBL)	
21 August 2025	(United States) Isaiah Briscoe	Kaohsiung Steelers	(Indonesia) Borneo Hornbills	
21 August 2025	(United States) Isaiah Todd	Kaohsiung Steelers	(Cyprus) Digenis Morpho	
21 August 2025	(Nigeria) Oli Daniel	Kaohsiung Steelers		
21 August 2025	(United Kingdom) (Brunei) Marcus Quirk	Kaohsiung Steelers	Yankey Ark	
21 August 2025	Kao Wei-Lun	Kaohsiung Steelers	Yankey Ark	
21 August 2025	Liu Cheng-Yen	Kaohsiung Steelers	Changhua Pauian BLL (SBL)	
21 August 2025	Chen Yu-An	Kaohsiung Steelers	Taiwan Beer (SBL)	
21 August 2025	Chu Yuk-Kiun	Kaohsiung Steelers		
21 August 2025	Li Wei-Ting	Kaohsiung Steelers		
21 August 2025	Lin Hsin-Hsiang	Kaohsiung Steelers		
21 August 2025	Wang Kai-Yu	Kaohsiung Steelers		
22 August 2025	(United States) Archie Goodwin	(China) Jiangsu Dragons	Taipei Fubon Braves	
26 August 2025	(Taiwan) (United States) Spencer Lin	(United States) Massachusetts Institute of Technology	Taipei Fubon Braves	
29 August 2025	(Taiwan) (Canada) Jonah Morrison	New Taipei CTBC DEA (TPBL)	Taoyuan Pauian Pilots	
31 August 2025	(Saint Vincent and the Grenadines) Brendon Smart	Taipei Fubon Braves	Taiwan Beer (SBL)	
3 September 2025	(The Gambia) Joof Alasan	Taiwan Beer (SBL)	Yankey Ark	
13 September 2025	Chen Chiang-shuan	(China) Nanjing Monkey Kings	Taoyuan Pauian Pilots	
17 September 2025	(United States) Femi Olujobi	(Japan) Fighting Eagles Nagoya	Taipei Fubon Braves	
19 September 2025	(Taiwan) (United States) Will Artino	(Indonesia) Kesatria Bengawan Solo	Taoyuan Pauian Pilots	
23 September 2025	(Lithuania) Mindaugas Kupšas	(Venezuela) Trotamundos de Carabobo	Yankey Ark	
25 September 2025	(United States) Troy Gillenwater	(China) Guangdong Southern Tigers	Taipei Fubon Braves	
1 October 2025	(United States) Setric Millner Jr.	(Finland) Kauhajoki Basket	Taoyuan Pauian Pilots	
2 October 2025	(Iran) (England) Aaron Geramipoor	(Mexico) Soles de Mexicali	Taipei Fubon Braves	
2 October 2025	(United States) JaKobe Coles	(United States) Grand Canyon University	Yankey Ark	
8 October 2025	(United States) Kenneth Faried	(Puerto Rico) Cangrejeros de Santurce	TSG GhostHawks	
24 October 2025	(United States) Bennie Boatwright	(China) Shanxi Loongs	Taipei Fubon Braves	
28 October 2025	(United States) Quincy Davis	Free Agent	Yankey Ark	
31 October 2025	(United States) Femi Olujobi	Taipei Fubon Braves	(Japan) Shimane Susanoo Magic	
4 November 2025	(United States) Loren Jackson	(Poland) Czarni Słupsk	Yankey Ark	
8 November 2025	(United States) Kenneth Faried	TSG GhostHawks	(Greece) Panathinaikos	
October 2025	(United States) Jade Tse	(United States) Queens College	Yankey Ark	

== Imports, foreign students, and heritage players ==
Club	Imports	Foreign students (Note: Team can either register a total of 3 heritage player and foreign students combined but not more than 1 heritage player.)	Heritage players (Note: Heritage player refers to player of Taiwanese descent but does not met the FIBA eligibility rules to be local.)	Released players
Taipei Fubon Braves	(United States) Archie Goodwin (United States) Mike Singletary (Serbia) (Canada) Stefan Janković (United States) Michael Holyfield	(Senegal) Mouhamed Mbaye (United States) Jonathan Nchekwube	(United States) Spencer Lin	(United States) Femi Olujobi (United States) Bennie Boatwright (United States) Troy Gillenwater (Iran) (England) Aaron Geramipoor (South Sudan) Deng Acuoth
Taoyuan Pauian Pilots	(United States) Alec Brown (United States) Treveon Graham (United States) (Taiwan) Will Artino (Note: Artino is considered as a foreigner in PLG but will be considered as local player in EASL.) (United States) Setric Millner Jr.	(Senegal) Amdy Dieng		
TSG GhostHawks	(United States) De'Mon Brooks (Lithuania) Benas Griciunas (United States) Ray McCallum (Canada) Fardaws Aimaq	(Nigeria) Humphery Gabriel (Mongolia) Bayasgalan Delgerchuluun (Nigeria) Oli Daniel	(United States) Ethan Chung	(United States) Kenneth Faried (United States) Tobin Carberry
Yankey Ark	(Lithuania) Mindaugas Kupšas (Ukraine) Artem Kovalov (United States) Cameron McGriff	(United Kingdom) (Brunei) Marcus Quirk (The Gambia) Joof Alasan (United States) Jamarcus Mearidy		(United States) Loren Jackson (United States) George King (United States) JaKobe Coles (Malta) Samuel Deguara (United States) Jade Tse

== Preseason ==
The Preseason will take place on October 12 and 13, 2024.

== Regular season ==
Pos	Team	W	L	PCT	GB	Qualification
1	Taoyuan Pauian Pilots	21	3	.875	—	Final
2	Taipei Fubon Braves	12	12	.500	9	Advance to Playoff
3	Tainan TSG GhostHawks	11	13	.458	10	Advance to Playoff
4	Yankey Ark	4	20	.167	17	

Updated to match(es) played on 17 May 26. Source: P.League+

=== Results summary ===
Home \ Away	YKE	TSG	TFB	TPP
Yankey		89–114	112–91	91–127
Yankey		98–104	108–117	84–106
Yankey		87–129	84–120	92–97
Yankey		88–102	96–117	100–94
GhostHawks	102–90		90–85	87–107
GhostHawks	125–103		97–91	98–100
GhostHawks	86–67		89–116	110–84
GhostHawks	92–107		94–100	94–104
Braves	133–106	76–112		97–118
Braves	126–105	124–86		94–95
Braves	94–102	80–62		91–109
Braves	91–89	114–89		114–95
Pilots	131–95	101–89	112–96	
Pilots	101–90	99–91	105–99	
Pilots	98–93	105–95	99–89	
Pilots	124–103	93–89	99–87	

Updated to match(es) played on 17 May 26. Source: / P.League+
Legend: Blue = home team win; Red = away team win.
For upcoming matches, an "a" indicates there is an article about the rivalry between the two participants.
Matches with lighter background shading were decided after overtime.

== Playoffs ==
Playoffs			Finals
			1	Pilots	4
2	Braves	3	2	Braves	3
3	GhostHawks	1

Bold Series winner
Italic Team with home-court advantage

PLAYOFF

21 May 2026 Game 1	Tainan TSG GhostHawks	92– 119 (Series: Braves leads series, 1–0)	Taipei Fubon Braves	Taipei Heping Basketball Gymnasium, Taipei City
19:00 (UTC+8)	Scoring by quarter: 26–23, 18–35, 28–37, 20–24
	Pts: Fardaws Aimaq 22; Rebs: Fardaws Aimaq 9 Asts: Ku Mao Wei-Chia 5	boxscore	Pts: Archie Goodwin 45; Rebs: Michael Holyfield 13; Asts: Chen Yu-Wei 9	Attendance: 4,362; Referees: Pang Yun-Han, Mei Ming-Sheng, Chang Wei-jun

23 May 2026 Game 2	Tainan TSG GhostHawks	98–97 (Series: Series tied, 1–1)	Taipei Fubon Braves	Taipei Heping Basketball Gymnasium, Taipei City
17:00 (UTC+8)	Scoring by quarter: 26–17, 22–27, 26–29, 24–24
	Pts: Fardaws Aimaq 24; Rebs: Fardaws Aimaq 15; Asts: Ku Mao Wei-Chia 8	boxscore	Pts: Archie Goodwin 23; Rebs: Mouhamed Mbaye 9 Asts: Chen Yu-Wei 7	Attendance: 4,885; Referees: Chang Lu-Yueh, Yu Hao-Ping, Chang Jun-Yao

26 May 2026 Game 3	Taipei Fubon Braves	91–83 (Series: Braves leads series, 2–1)	Tainan TSG GhostHawks	National Cheng Kung University, Tainan
19:00 (UTC+8)	Scoring by quarter: 25–19, 28–25, 11–24, 27–15
	Pts: Archie Goodwin 23; Rebs: Michael Holyfield 10; Asts: Chen Yu-Wei 10	boxscore	Pts: De'Mon Brooks 26; Rebs: De'Mon Brooks 7 Asts: Ku Mao Wei-Chia 5	Attendance: 2,386; Referees: Yu Rong, Hung Yung-Yu, Chang Zhi-zhan

28 May 2026 Game 4	Taipei Fubon Braves	109–79 (Series: Braves wins series, 3–1)	Tainan TSG GhostHawks	National Cheng Kung University, Tainan
19:00 (UTC+8)	Scoring by quarter: 24–24, 32–21, 34–14, 19–20
	Pts: De'Mon Brooks 19; Rebs: Humphery Gabriel 11; Asts: Ku Mao Wei-Chia 7	boxscore	Pts: Archie Goodwin 30; Rebs: Stefan Janković 11; Asts: Chen Yu-Wei 6	Attendance: 2,880; Referees: Chang Lu-Yueh, Mei Ming-Sheng, Chang Wei-jun

FINAL

5 June 2026 Game 1	Taipei Fubon Braves	97–95(OT) (Series: Braves leads series, 1–0)	Taoyuan Pauian Pilots	Taoyuan Arena, Taoyuan City
19:00 (UTC+8)	Scoring by quarter: 12–15, 28–25, 21–20, 22–23, Overtime: 14–12
	Pts: Archie Goodwin 30; Rebs: Tseng Hsiang-chun 11; Asts: Archie Goodwin 6	boxscore	Pts: Lu Chun-Hsiang 26; Rebs: Alec Brown 14; Asts: Alec Brown 4	Attendance: 4,353; Referees: Chang Lu-Yueh, Chang Zhi-Zhan, Yu Rong

7 June 2026 Game 2	Taipei Fubon Braves	94–98 (Series: Series tied, 1–1)	Taoyuan Pauian Pilots	Taoyuan Arena, Taoyuan City
17:00 (UTC+8)	Scoring by quarter: 30–34, 28–19, 15–22, 21–23
	Pts: Stefan Janković 19; Rebs: Michael Holyfield 18; Asts: Archie Goodwin, Lin Chih-chieh 5	boxscore	Pts: Alec Brown 29; Rebs: Alec Brown 12; Asts: Pai Yao-Cheng 9	Attendance: 5,395; Referees: Lai Jian-Zhong, Mei Ming-Sheng, Yu Hao-Ping

10 June 2026 Game 3	Taoyuan Pauian Pilots	76–85 (Series: Braves leads series, 2–1)	Taipei Fubon Braves	Taipei Heping Basketball Gymnasium, Taipei City
19:00 (UTC+8)	Scoring by quarter: 27–22, 19–28, 22–21, 8–14
	Pts: Treveon Graham 14; Rebs: Alec Brown 9 Asts: Kuan Ta-You 6	boxscore	Pts: Archie Goodwin 25; Rebs: Michael Holyfield 16; Asts: Chen Yu-Wei 5	Attendance: 5,665; Referees: Chang Lu-Yueh, Hung Yung-Yu, Chang Jun-Yao

12 June 2026 Game 4	Taoyuan Pauian Pilots	84 –77 (Series: Series tied, 2–2)	Taipei Fubon Braves	Taipei Heping Basketball Gymnasium, Taipei City
19:00 (UTC+8)	Scoring by quarter: 27–20, 20–11, 20–19, 17–27
	Pts: Lu Chun-Hsiang 15; Rebs: Alec Brown 13; Asts: Lu Chun-Hsiang, Alec Brown 3	boxscore	Pts: Archie Goodwin 29; Rebs: Michael Holyfield 15; Asts: Chen Yu-Wei 4	Attendance: 6,892; Referees: Yu Rong, Mei Ming-Sheng, Chang Wei-jun

14 June 2026 Game 5	Taipei Fubon Braves	87–78 (Series: Braves leads series, 3–2)	Taoyuan Pauian Pilots	Taoyuan Arena, Taoyuan City
17:00 (UTC+8)	Scoring by quarter: 20–12, 28–17, 18–21, 21–28
	Pts: Mouhamed Mbaye 24; Rebs: Michael Holyfield 9 Asts: Chen Yu-Wei 4, Stefan Janković 4	boxscore	Pts: Alec Brown 19; Rebs: Will Artino 11; Asts: Lu Chun-Hsiang 7	Referees: Chang Lu-Yueh, Yu Hao-Ping, Hung Yung-Yu

16 June 2026 Game 6	Taoyuan Pauian Pilots	72 –69 (Series: Series tied, 3–3)	Taipei Fubon Braves	Taipei Heping Basketball Gymnasium, Taipei City
19:00 (UTC+8)	Scoring by quarter: 19–25, 20–15, 15–19, 17–10
	Pts: Alec Brown 25; Rebs: Amdy Dieng 10; Asts: Pai Yao-Cheng 5	boxscore	Pts: Chen Yu-Wei 14; Rebs: Michael Holyfield 17; Asts: Chen Yu-Wei 4	Referees: Yu Rong, Chang Wei-jun, Chang Jun-Yao

18 June 2026 Game 7	Taipei Fubon Braves	81–107 (Series: Pilots wins series, 4–3)	Taoyuan Pauian Pilots	Taoyuan Arena, Taoyuan City
19:00 (UTC+8)	Scoring by quarter: 18–26, 21–28, 28–25, 14–28
	Pts: Archie Goodwin 44; Rebs: Michael Holyfield 16; Asts: Archie Goodwin, Chen Yu-Wei 4	boxscore	Pts: Lu Chun-Hsiang 26; Rebs: Will Artino 10; Asts: Lu Chun-Hsiang 7	Referees: Chang Jun-Yao, Lai Jian-Zhong, Hung Yung-Yu

== Media ==
The games will be aired on television via FTV One and MOMOTV, and will be broadcast online on YouTube Official Channel and 4GTV.
