= List of 2024–25 PLG season transactions =

This is a list of transactions that took place during the 2024 PLG off-season and the 2024–25 PLG season.

== Retirement ==
Date	Name	Team(s) played (years)	Age	Notes	Ref.
July 31	Sung Yu-Hsuan	Hsinchu Toplus Lioneers (2020–2024)	34	Also played overseas. Hired as assistant strength and conditioning coach by Hsinchu Toplus Lioneers.	
August 9	Chiu Po-Chang	Kaohsiung 17LIVE Steelers (2022–2024)	28	Hired as strength and conditioning trainer by Kaohsiung 17LIVE Steelers.	
August 15	Wu Sung-Wei	Formosa Dreamers (2020–2024)	31		
August 28	Lu Chi-Min	Hsinchu Toplus Lioneers (2022–2024)	34	Hired as assistant coach by Hsinchu Toplus Lioneers.	

== Front office movements ==
=== General manager changes ===
Off-season

Departure date	Team	Outgoing general manager	Reason for departure	Hire date	Incoming general manager	Last managerial position	Ref.
July 18	Kaohsiung 17LIVE Steelers	Kenny Kao	Replaced				
—N/a	Tainan TSG GhostHawks	—N/a	—N/a				

== Player movements ==
=== Trades ===
July
July 8, 2024	To Formosa Dreamers: Cash considerations	To Taiwan Beer Leopards: Ting Kuang-Hao
July 12, 2024	To Kaohsiung 17LIVE Steelers: Chen Fan Po-Yen; 2024 first-round draft pick; 2024 second-round draft pick	To Taipei Fubon Braves: 2024 first-round 1st draft pick

=== Free agents ===
Player	Date signed	New team	Former team	Ref
Lin Chih-Chieh	June 25	Taipei Fubon Braves		
Chiang Yu-An	July 2	Formosa Dreamers	Taiwan Beer Leopards (T1 League)	
Su Shih-Hsuan	July 2	New Taipei Kings		
Lee Chi-Wei	July 3	Hsinchu Toplus Lioneers	Taiwan Beer Leopards (T1 League)	
Chen Jen-Jei	July 4	Formosa Dreamers		
Chen Yu-Jui	July 4	Taoyuan Pauian Pilots		
Kuan Ta-Yu	July 4	Taoyuan Pauian Pilots		
Lee Te-Wei	July 4	Formosa Dreamers		
Lu Chun-Hsiang	July 4	Taoyuan Pauian Pilots		
Lu Kuan-Liang	July 4	Formosa Dreamers		
Wu Chia-Chun	July 4	Formosa Dreamers		
Hung Kai-Chieh	July 16	Taipei Fubon Braves		
Chou Kuei-Yu	July 17	Taipei Fubon Braves		
Lin Chih-Wei	July 18	Taipei Fubon Braves	Kaohsiung 17LIVE Steelers	
Nick King	July 23	Taipei Fubon Braves	Tainan TSG GhostHawks (T1 League)	
Liu Yen-Ting	July 25	Kaohsiung 17LIVE Steelers	Taipei Taishin Mars (T1 League)	
Nick Perkins	July 30	Tainan TSG GhostHawks	Nagasaki Velca (B.League)	
Alec Brown	July 31	Taoyuan Pauian Pilots		
Treveon Graham	July 31	Taoyuan Pauian Pilots		
Chen Yu-Wei	August 1	Taipei Fubon Braves	Kaohsiung 17LIVE Steelers	
Li Wei-Ting	August 2	Kaohsiung 17LIVE Steelers	New Taipei Kings	
De'Mon Brooks	August 6	Tainan TSG GhostHawks	Levanga Hokkaido (B.League)	
Ku Mao Wei-Chia	August 8	Tainan TSG GhostHawks		
Kao Wei-Lun	August 9	Kaohsiung 17LIVE Steelers	VNU Lions (undrafted in 2024)	
Branden Frazier	August 11	Tainan TSG GhostHawks	Estudiantes (LEB Oro)	
Ethan Chung	August 14	Tainan TSG GhostHawks	Pacific Boxers	
Jarrod Jones	August 14	Taoyuan Pauian Pilots	Türk Telekom (Basketbol Süper Ligi)	
Brandon Walters	August 15	Taipei Fubon Braves	Yalovaspor (Basketbol Süper Ligi)	
Jordan Hamilton	August 16	Taipei Fubon Braves	Aomori Wat's (B.League)	
Žiga Dimec	August 17	Tainan TSG GhostHawks	Anwil Włocławek (Polish Basketball League)	
Hsieh Zong-Rong	August 20	Tainan TSG GhostHawks	Taipei Fubon Braves	
Jeff Withey	August 26	Taipei Fubon Braves	Wonju DB Promy (Korean Basketball League)	
Julian Boyd	August 28	Taoyuan Pauian Pilots	Formosa Dreamers	
Bayasgalan Delgerchuluun	August 28	Tainan TSG GhostHawks		
Chang Chen-Ya	August 31	Taipei Fubon Braves	Taoyuan Pauian Pilots	
Isaiah Briscoe	September 9	Kaohsiung 17LIVE Steelers	Maroussi (Greek Basket League)	
Christian Anigwe			New Taipei Kings (waived on April 3, 2024)	
Will Artino			Hsinchu Toplus Lioneers (waived on January 30, 2024)	
Anthony Bennett			Kaohsiung 17LIVE Steelers (waived on December 22, 2023)	
Taylor Braun			Taipei Fubon Braves (waived on January 4, 2024)	
Chai Chen-Hao			New Taipei Kings	
Chang Po-Wei			Kaohsiung 17LIVE Steelers	
Chen Yu-Han			Taoyuan Pauian Pilots	
Cheng Tzu-Yang			Formosa Taishin Dreamers	
Chieng Li-Huan			Taoyuan Pauian Pilots	
Chou Yi-Hsiang			Taoyuan Pauian Pilots (waived on September 9)	
Deyonta Davis			Hsinchu Toplus Lioneers	
Steven Guinchard			Taipei Fubon Braves	
Lan Shao-Fu			Tainan TSG GhostHawks (waived on August 12)	
Lee Hsueh-Lin			Taoyuan Pauian Pilots	
Wendell Lewis			New Taipei Kings	
Lin Meng-Hsueh			Taipei Fubon Braves	
Lin Yao-Tsung			Formosa Dreamers	
Lu Che-Yi			Kaohsiung 17LIVE Steelers	
Chris McCullough			Formosa Dreamers	
Jamarcus Mearidy			Hsinchu Toplus Lioneers	
Kennedy Meeks			Taoyuan Pauian Pilots	
Tony Mitchell			New Taipei Kings	
Femi Olujobi			Kaohsiung 17LIVE Steelers	
Pan Kuan-Han			Hsinchu JKO Lioneers (waived on April 23, 2021)	
Mike Singletary			Taipei Fubon Braves (waived on April 2, 2024)	
Su Chih-Cheng			Taoyuan Pauian Pilots (waived on November 23, 2022)	
Hasheem Thabeet			Kaohsiung 17LIVE Steelers	
Tseng Yu-Hao			New Taipei Kings	
Yang Chin-Min			New Taipei Kings	
Yang Hsing-Chih			New Taipei Kings	
Jerran Young			New Taipei Kings	

=== Going to other Taiwanese leagues ===
Player	Date signed	New team	New league	P. League+ team	Ref
Chen Kuan-Chuan	July 5	Taipei Taishin Mars	T1 League	Kaohsiung 17LIVE Steelers	
Chang Tsung-Hsien	July 12	Formosa Dreamers	Taiwan Professional Basketball League	Taipei Fubon Braves	
Lu Cheng-Ju	July 15	New Taipei Kings	Taiwan Professional Basketball League	Kaohsiung 17LIVE Steelers	
Shih Chin-Yao	July 18	New Taipei CTBC DEA	Taiwan Professional Basketball League	Kaohsiung 17LIVE Steelers	
Chris Johnson	July 24	New Taipei Kings	Taiwan Professional Basketball League	Taipei Fubon Braves	
Kenneth Chien	July 31	Taipei Taishin Mars	Taiwan Professional Basketball League	Formosa Dreamers	
Wang Lu-Hsiang	August 1	Taipei Taishin Mars	Taiwan Professional Basketball League	Kaohsiung 17LIVE Steelers	
Jason Washburn	August 1	New Taipei Kings	Taiwan Professional Basketball League	Taoyuan Pauian Pilots	
Li Ruei-Ci	August 2	New Taipei CTBC DEA	Taiwan Professional Basketball League	Kaohsiung 17LIVE Steelers	
Ihor Zaytsev	August 26	Taipei Taishin Mars	Taiwan Professional Basketball League	Taipei Fubon Braves	

=== Going overseas ===
Player	Date signed	New team	New country	Former P. League+ team	Ref
Rayvonte Rice	June 4	Liaoning Flying Leopards	China	Kaohsiung 17LIVE Steelers	
Justin Patton	June 15	Indios de San Francisco de Macorís	Dominican Republic	Taipei Fubon Braves (waived on March 15, 2024)	
Prince Ibeh	June 17	El Calor de Cancún	Mexico	Taipei Fubon Braves	
Sedrick Barefield	July 14	Blackwater Bossing	Philippines	Taipei Fubon Braves (waived on January 4, 2024)	
Tseng Hsiang-Chun	July 15	Toyotsu Fighting Eagles Nagoya	Japan	Taipei Fubon Braves	
Tyler Bey	August 5	Hapoel Haifa	Israel	Taipei Fubon Braves	
Devyn Marble	September 3	Porto	Portugal	Formosa Dreamers	
Cameron Clark	September 11	Eastern	Hong Kong	Kaohsiung 17LIVE Steelers	

=== Waived ===
Player	Date	Former team	Ref
Lan Shao-Fu	August 12	Tainan TSG GhostHawks	
Chou Yi-Hsiang	September 9	Taoyuan Pauian Pilots	

== Draft ==
Pick	Player	Date signed	Team	Ref
1	Mouhamed Mbaye	August 7	Taipei Fubon Braves	
2	Lee Yun-Chieh	July 15	Tainan TSG GhostHawks	
3	Marcus Quirk	August 2	Kaohsiung 17LIVE Steelers	
4	Chen Li-Sheng	August 2	Taoyuan Pauian Pilots	
5	Chang Chih-Hao	July 15	Tainan TSG GhostHawks	
6	Chuang Chao-Sheng	July 19	Kaohsiung 17LIVE Steelers	
7	Wang Kai-Yu	July 19	Kaohsiung 17LIVE Steelers	
8	Wang Jhe-Yu	—	Kaohsiung 17LIVE Steelers	
9	Chiang Chun	—	Taipei Fubon Braves	
10	Lin Hsin-Hsiang	July 19	Kaohsiung 17LIVE Steelers	
11	Chu Yuk-Kiun	July 19	Kaohsiung 17LIVE Steelers	
