= 2024–25 PLG season =

- League: P. League+
- Sport: Basketball
- Duration: 2024 – May 21, 2025
- Games: 24
- Teams: 4
- TV partner(s): FTV One, MOMOTV

Draft
- Top draft pick: Mouhamed Mbaye
- Picked by: Taipei Fubon Braves

Regular season

Playoffs

Finals
- Champions: Taoyuan Pauian Pilots
- Runners-up: Taipei Fubon Braves

P. League+ seasons
- ← 2023–24 2025–26 →

The 2024–25 PLG season was the 5th season of the P. League+ (PLG). The season ended on May 21, 2025, after the Taoyuan Pauian Pilots defeated the Taipei Fubon Braves in the 2025 PLG Finals, the first to go the full seven-game length.

== Transactions ==
=== Retirement ===
- On July 31, 2024, Sung Yu-Hsuan was appointed as Hsinchu Toplus Lioneers' assistant strength and conditioning coach, ending his playing career.
- On August 9, 2024, Chiu Po-Chang was appointed as Kaohsiung 17LIVE Steelers' strength and conditioning trainer, ending his playing career.
- On August 15, 2024, the Formosa Dreamers announced Wu Sung-Wei's retirement from professional basketball.
- On August 28, 2024, Lu Chi-Min was appointed as Hsinchu Toplus Lioneers' assistant coach, ending his playing career.

== Imports, foreign students, and heritage players ==
Club	Imports	Foreign students	Heritage players	Released players
Kaohsiung Steelers	(Canada) Jordy Tshimanga (United States) Isaiah Briscoe (United States) Will Davis	(Nigeria) Oli Daniel (United Kingdom) Marcus Quirk		(United States) Josh Price
TSG GhostHawks	(United States) De'Mon Brooks (Slovenia) Žiga Dimec (United States) Branden Frazier (United States) Nick Perkins	(Nigeria) Humphery Gabriel (Mongolia) Bayasgalan Delgerchuluun	(United States) Ethan Chung	
Taipei Fubon Braves	(United States) Jabari Bird (United States) Nick King (United States) Brandon Walters (United States) Jeff Withey	(Senegal) Mouhamed Mbaye (Saint Vincent and the Grenadines) Brendon Smart		(United States) Arnett Moultrie (United States) Jordan Hamilton
Taoyuan Pauian Pilots	(United States) Julian Boyd (United States) Alec Brown (United States) Treveon Graham (United States) Jarrod Jones	(Senegal) Amdy Dieng		

Note 1: "Heritage player" refers to a player who is of Taiwanese descent but does not meet the FIBA eligibility rules to be local.

Note 2: Team can either register two heritage players, or one foreign student and one heritage player.

== Preseason ==
The preseason took place on October 12 and 13, 2024.

== Regular season ==
Pos	Team	W	L	PCT	GB	Qualification
1	Taoyuan Pauian Pilots	18	6	.750	—	Final
2	Taipei Fubon Braves	15	9	.625	3	Advance to Playoff
3	Tainan TSG GhostHawks	13	11	.542	5	Advance to Playoff
4	Kaohsiung 17LIVE Steelers	2	22	.083	16	

Updated to match(es) played on 19 May 2024. Source: P.League+

=== Results summary ===
Home \ Away	KLS	TSG	TFB	TPP
Steelers		87–93	107–76	94–123
Steelers		86–106	96–103	93–105
Steelers		89–92	113–119	80–90
Steelers		104–107	83–101	76–116
GhostHawks	110–86		99–102	85–101
GhostHawks	99–74		91–87	86–91
GhostHawks	119–108		97–102	101–94
GhostHawks	110–100		110–114	81–103
Braves	108–93	93–99		74–84
Braves	112–103	85–99		117–114
Braves	115–106	104–98		100–106
Braves	98–92	103–94		108–117
Pilots	91–74	104–92	105–94	
Pilots	114–77	99–96	115–100	
Pilots	114–77	100–89	93–111	
Pilots	108–116	111–102	93–98	

Source: / P.League+
Legend: Blue = home team win; Yellow = draw; Red = away team win.
For upcoming matches, an "a" indicates there is an article about the rivalry between the two participants.
Matches with lighter background shading were decided after overtime.

== Playoffs ==
Playoffs			Finals
			1	Pilots	4
2	**Braves**	3	2	Braves	3
3	GhostHawks	1

Bold: Series winner
Italic: Team with home-court advantage

Playoff

24 April 2025 Game 1	Tainan TSG GhostHawks	79– **91** (Series: **Braves leads series, 1–0**)	**Taipei Fubon Braves**	Taipei Heping Basketball Gymnasium, Taipei City
19:00 (UTC+8)	Scoring by quarter: 25–14, 14–20, 28–27, 12–30
	Pts: Bayasgalan Delgerchuluun 15; Rebs: Brandon Perkins 8 Asts: Ku Mao Wei-Chia 6	boxscore	Pts: Jeff Withey 18; Rebs: Jeff Withey 18; Asts: Chen Yu-Wei 7	Attendance: 4,126; Referees: Chang Lu-Yueh, Yu Hao-Ping, Wang Li-Chang

24 April 2025 Game 2	Tainan TSG GhostHawks	105– **108** (Series: **Braves leads series, 2–0**)	**Taipei Fubon Braves**	Taipei Heping Basketball Gymnasium, Taipei City
17:00 (UTC+8)	Scoring by quarter: 16–27, 38–18, 28–40, 23–23
	Pts: Branden Frazier 29; Rebs: Brandon Perkins 12; Asts: Ku Mao Wei-Chia 7	boxscore	Pts: Nick King 24; Rebs: Nick King 10; Asts: Nick King 8	Attendance: 4,566; Referees: Pang Yun-Han, Mei Ming-Sheng, Chang Wei-jun

27 April 2025 Game 3	Taipei Fubon Braves	104–**111** (Series: **Braves leads series, 2–1**)	**Tainan TSG GhostHawks**	National Cheng Kung University, Tainan
19:00 (UTC+8)	Scoring by quarter: 25–38, 28–33, 21–26, 30–14
	Pts: Nick King 21; Rebs: Brandon Walters 11; Asts: Chen Yu-Wei 5	boxscore	Pts: Branden Frazier 24; Rebs: Žiga Dimec 11; Asts: Ku Mao Wei-Chia 8	Attendance: 3,125; Referees: Lai Jian-Zhong, Hung Yung-Yu, Huang Hsiao-Han

28 April 2025 Game 4	**Taipei Fubon Braves**	**110**–90 (Series: **Braves wins series, 3–1**)	Tainan TSG GhostHawks	National Cheng Kung University, Tainan
19:00 (UTC+8)	Scoring by quarter: 29–29, 18–22, 31–18, 32–21
	Pts: Brandon Perkins 22; Rebs: Brandon Perkins 9 Asts: Ku Mao Wei-Chia 7	boxscore	Pts: Mouhamed Mbaye 20; Rebs: Jeff Withey 16; Asts: Chou Kuei-yu 7	Attendance: 2,508; Referees: Chang Lu-Yueh, Mei Ming-Sheng, Chang Zhi-chan

Final

5 May 2025 Game 1	**Taipei Fubon Braves**	**78**–76 (Series: **Braves leads series, 1–0**)	Taoyuan Pauian Pilots	Taoyuan Arena, Taoyuan City
19:30 (UTC+8)	Scoring by quarter: 13–22, 20–14, 20–19, 25–21
	Pts: Mouhamed Mbaye 26; Rebs: Brandon Walters 17; Asts: Lai Ting-En, Chen Yu-Wei 5	boxscore	Pts: Alec Brown 26; Rebs: Amdy Dieng 17; Asts: Pai Yao-Cheng 5	Attendance: 5,079; Referees: Pang Yun-Han, Hung Yung-Yu, Wang Li-Chang

7 May 2025 Game 2	Taipei Fubon Braves	81–**92** (Series: **Series tied, 1–1**)	**Taoyuan Pauian Pilots**	Taoyuan Arena, Taoyuan City
19:30 (UTC+8)	Scoring by quarter: 28–23, 27–24, 14–26, 12–19
	Pts: Jeff Withey 18; Rebs: Jeff Withey 13; Asts: Lai Ting-En, Jeff Withey 4	boxscore	Pts: Jarrod Jones 21; Rebs: Jarrod Jones 11; Asts: Treveon Graham 5	Attendance: 5,363; Referees: Chang Lu-Yueh, Mei Ming-Sheng, Zhang Jun-Yao

10 May 2025 Game 3	Taoyuan Pauian Pilots	81– **88** (Series: **Braves leads series, 2–1**)	**Taipei Fubon Braves**	Taipei Heping Basketball Gymnasium, Taipei City
14:30 (UTC+8)	Scoring by quarter: 22–25, 19–19, 24–20, 16–24
	Pts: Treveon Graham 29; Rebs: Amdy Dieng 9 Asts: Jarrod Jones 5	boxscore	Pts: Nick King, Mouhamed Mbaye 19; Rebs: Brandon Walters, Jeff Withey 11; Asts: Nick King 5	Attendance: 6,589; Referees: Lai Jian-Zhong, Huang Hsiao-Han, Yu Hao-Ping

14 May 2025 Game 4	**Taoyuan Pauian Pilots**	**91**–75 (Series: **Series tied, 2–2**)	Taipei Fubon Braves	Taipei Heping Basketball Gymnasium, Taipei City
19:30 (UTC+8)	Scoring by quarter: 19–21, 21–22, 21–19, 30–13
	Pts: Lu Chun-Hsiang 28; Rebs: Alec Brown 15; Asts: Pai Yao-Cheng 8	boxscore	Pts: Mouhamed Mbaye 19; Rebs: Jeff Withey 14; Asts: Nick King 4	Attendance: 6,134; Referees: Pang Yun-Han, Hung Yung-Yu, Chang Zhi-zhan

17 May 2025 Game 5	**Taipei Fubon Braves**	**86**–83 (Series: **Braves leads series, 3–2**)	Taoyuan Pauian Pilots	Taoyuan Arena, Taoyuan City
19:30 (UTC+8)	Scoring by quarter: 24–29, 22–25, 12–16, 28–13
	Pts: Nick King 23; Rebs: Jeff Withey 16; Asts: Lai Ting-En, Lin Chih-chieh 6	boxscore	Pts: Lu Chun-Hsiang 21; Rebs: Alec Brown 13; Asts: Pai Yao-Cheng 6	Attendance: 5,900; Referees: Lai Jian-Zhong, Mei Ming-Sheng, Yu Hao-Ping

19 May 2025 Game 6	**Taoyuan Pauian Pilots**	**83**–67 (Series: **Series tied, 3–3**)	Taipei Fubon Braves	Taipei Heping Basketball Gymnasium, Taipei City
19:30 (UTC+8)	Scoring by quarter: 23–16, 24–15, 17–22, 19–14
	Pts: Lu Chun-Hsiang 19; Rebs: Julian Boyd 14; Asts: Lu Chun-Hsiang 6	boxscore	Pts: Jeff Withey, Nick King 16; Rebs: Jeff Withey, Mouhamed Mbaye 11; Asts: Nick King 4	Attendance: 5,267; Referees: Pang Yun-Han, Hung Yung-Yu, Chang Lu-Yueh

21 May 2025 Game 7	Taipei Fubon Braves	86– **89** (Series: **Pilots wins series, 4–3**)	**Taoyuan Pauian Pilots**	Taoyuan Arena, Taoyuan City
19:30 (UTC+8)	Scoring by quarter: 21–25, 29–20, 23–20, 13–24
	Pts: Jeff Withey 17; Rebs: Jeff Withey 25; Asts: Lin Chih-chieh 4	boxscore	Pts: Lu Chun-Hsiang, Alec Brown 20; Rebs: Alec Brown 16; Asts: Pai Yao-Cheng 7	Attendance: 5,900; Referees: Pang Yun-Han, Mei Ming-Sheng, Chang Lu-Yueh

== Statistics ==
=== Individual statistic leaders ===
Category	Player	Team(s)	Statistic
Points per game	Isaiah Briscoe	Kaohsiung 17LIVE Steelers	32.80
Rebounds per game	Jordy Tshimanga	Kaohsiung 17LIVE Steelers	17.00
Assists per game	Isaiah Briscoe	Kaohsiung 17LIVE Steelers	8.40
Steals per game	Jordy Tshimanga	Kaohsiung 17LIVE Steelers	1.80
Blocks per game	Jordy Tshimanga	Kaohsiung 17LIVE Steelers	2.50

== Awards ==
=== Yearly awards ===
2024–25 PLG awards
Award		Recipient(s)	ref
Most Valuable Player		Lu Chun-Hsiang (Taoyuan Pauian Pilots)	
Import of the Year		Alec Brown (Taoyuan Pauian Pilots)	
6th Man of the Year		Li Chia-Kang (Taoyuan Pauian Pilots)	
Rookie of the Year		Marcus Quirk (Kaohsiung 17LIVE Steelers)	
Defensive Player of the Year		Jordy Tshimanga (Kaohsiung 17LIVE Steelers)	
Most Improved Player		Li Chia-Kang (Taoyuan Pauian Pilots)	
GM of the Year		Li Chung-Shu (Taoyuan Pauian Pilots)	
Coach of the Year		Iurgi Caminos (Taoyuan Pauian Pilots)	
Best Home Court		Taipei Fubon Braves	
Mr. Popular		Lin Chih-Chieh (Taipei Fubon Braves)	
PLG Cheerleader Squad of the Year		Fubon Angels (Taipei Fubon Braves)	
Highlight of the Year	Clutch Shot		
Highlight of the Year	Dunk		
Highlight of the Year	Assist		
Highlight of the Year	Circus Shot		
Highlight of the Year	Block		
Highlight of the Year	Handles		
PLG Cheerleader Ms. Popular		Nam Min-Jeong (Taipei Fubon Braves)	
PLG Cheerleader Rookie of the Year		Lee Ho-Zeong (Fubon Angels)	

- All-PLG First Team:
  - Lu Chun-Hsiang, Taoyuan Pauian Pilots
  - Li Chia-Kang, Taoyuan Pauian Pilots
  - Alec Brown, Taoyuan Pauian Pilots
  - Ku Mao Wei-Chia, TSG GhostHawks
  - Chen Fan Po-Yen, Kaohsiung 17LIVE Steelers

- All-Defensive Team:
  - Li Chia-Kang, Taoyuan Pauian Pilots
  - Chou Kuei-yu, Taipei Fubon Braves
  - Humphery Gabriel, TSG GhostHawks
  - Hsieh Zong Rong, TSG GhostHawks
  - Jordy Tshimanga, Kaohsiung 17LIVE Steelers

== Media ==
The games were aired on television via FTV One and MOMOTV, and broadcast online on the YouTube official channel and 4GTV.

== Notable occurrences ==
- On June 26, 2024, PLG announced the merger with T1 League for the 2024–25 season. On July 8, Kaohsiung 17LIVE Steelers, Taipei Fubon Braves and Taoyuan Pauian Pilots announced to exit the merger and stay in PLG for the upcoming season. On July 9, TSG GhostHawks announced to exit the merger and join PLG. Formosa Dreamers, Hsinchu Toplus Lioneers and New Taipei Kings announced they will join the newly formed Taiwan Professional Basketball League.
- The 2024 PLG draft was originally scheduled to be held on July 10, 2024. The draft was suspended on July 1 due to the 2024 Taiwan Based Professional Basketball League draft. The draft was resumed on July 8 and rescheduled to July 12.
- The 2024 PLG draft combine was originally scheduled to be held on July 3, 2024. On June 29, PLG announced to hold the combine with 2024 T1 League draft.
- On July 14, both the Commissioner Richard Chang and the CEO Cheng Wei-Po announced their resignation.
