= List of Taoyuan Pauian Pilots head coaches =

== Key ==
GC	Games coached
W	Wins
L	Losses
Win%	Winning percentage
#	Number of coaches

== Coaches ==
Note: Statistics are correct through the end of the 2024–25 PLG season.

#	Name	Term	GC	W	L	Win%	GC	W	L	Win%	Achievements
#	Name	Term	Regular season				Playoffs				Achievements
Taoyuan Pilots
1	Liu I-Hsiang	2020–2021	Left before coaching a game								
2	Yang I-Feng	2020–2021	24	10	14	.417	5	2	3	.400	
3	Cheng Chih-Lung	2021–2022	16	5	11	.313	–	–	–	–	
4	Yen Hsing-Su	2021–2022	13	2	11	.154	–	–	–	–	
Taoyuan Pauian Pilots
5	Iurgi Caminos	2022–present	104	63	41	.606	21	9	12	.429	2023–24 and 2024–25 P.League+ Coach of the Year; 2024–25 P.League+ Championship
