= Setric Millner Jr. =

American basketball player (born 2000)

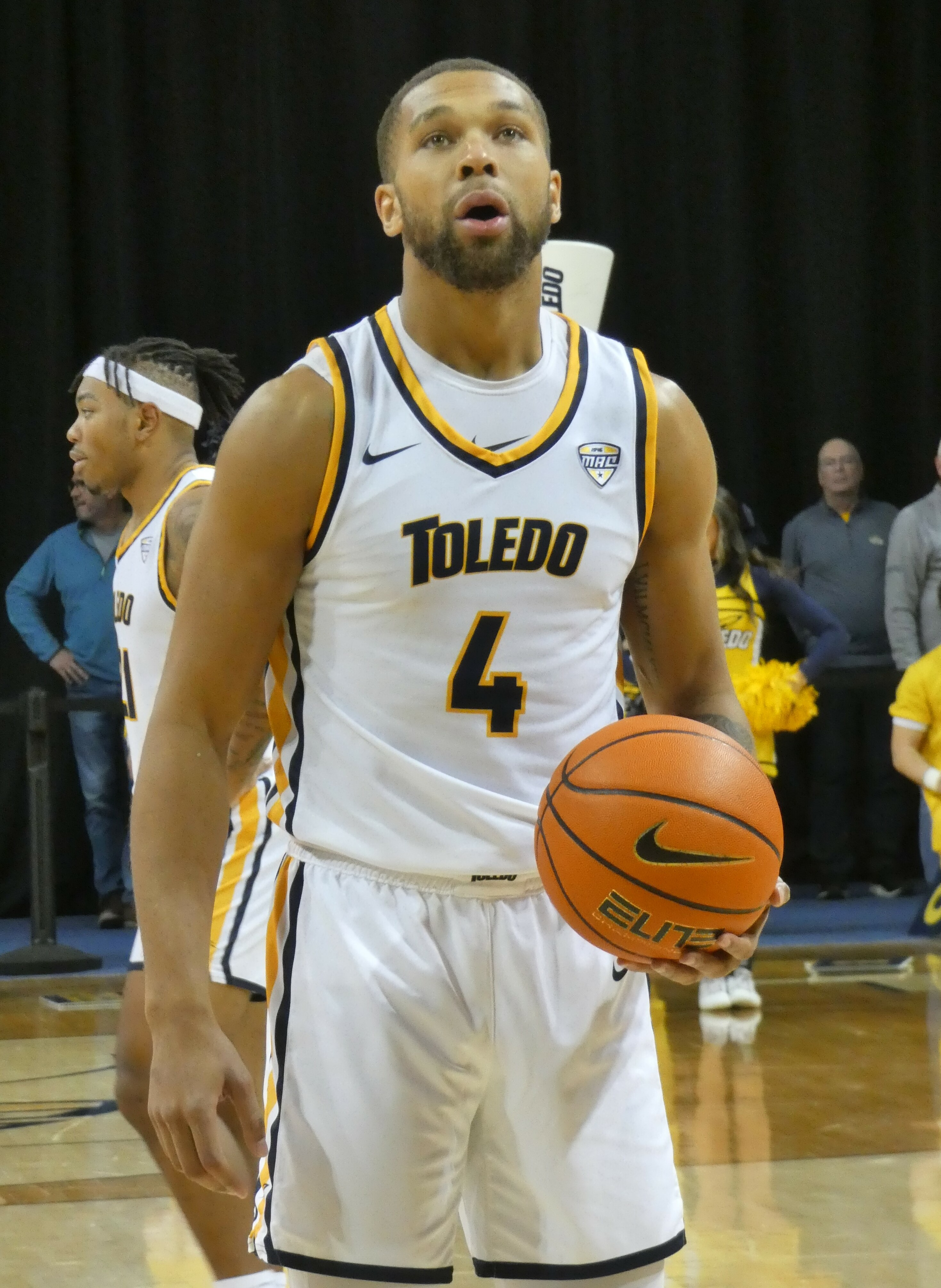
- Millner Jr. with Toledo in 2022

No. 9 – Taoyuan Pauian Pilots
- Position: Forward
- League: P. League+

Personal information
- Born: June 29, 2000 (age 26) Little Rock, Arkansas, U.S.
- Listed height: 6 ft 7 in (2.01 m)
- Listed weight: 205 lb (93 kg)

Career information
- High school: Grand Rapids Christian (Grand Rapids, Michigan)
- College: Cleveland State (2018–2019); Northwest Florida State (2019–2020); Toledo (2020–2023)
- NBA draft: 2023: undrafted
- Playing career: 2024–present

Career history
- 2024–2025: Kauhajoki Karhu
- 2025–present: Taoyuan Pauian Pilots

Career highlights
- P. League+ champion (2026); Second-team All-MAC (2023); Third-team All-MAC (2022)
- Stats at NBA.com
- Stats at Basketball Reference

Setric Deon "Seth" Millner Jr. (born June 29, 2000) is an American professional basketball player for Taoyuan Pauian Pilots of the P. League+. He played college basketball for the Cleveland State Vikings, Northwest Florida State Raiders and Toledo Rockets.

== High school career ==
Millner was raised in Little Rock, Arkansas, and played basketball, baseball, and football while growing up. His mother convinced him to focus on one sport so he committed himself to basketball. At a ninth grade Amateur Athletic Union (AAU) tournament in Indianapolis, Millner fractured his tibia in a fall and used a wheelchair for several months. He was unable to attend his high school in Little Rock as it did not have elevators so he was offered by his cousin, Duane Washington Jr., to move in with his family in Grand Rapids, Michigan, and attend Grand Rapids Christian High School which had elevators. Millner recovered from his injury during his sophomore season and played on the junior varsity team. As a junior, he led the team to a 26–1 record and a second-place finish in the state tournament. Millner averaged 20.1 points, 9.4 rebounds and 3.6 assists as a senior. He also joined the football team as a wide receiver during his senior year and earned scholarship offers in both sports.

Millner intended to play college basketball for the Toledo Rockets but his high school football season obstructed his signing and the team no longer had a scholarship available for him when he was finished. On April 11, 2018, Millner signed a National Letter of Intent to play college basketball for the Cleveland State Vikings.

== College career ==
Millner started all but one game as a freshman with the Vikings. The team lost 21 games and Millner opted to transfer after the athletic director made changes to the personnel. Millner spent the following season playing at Northwest Florida State College. He was recruited by Toledo Rockets head coach, Tod Kowalczyk, while playing at Northwest Florida State and transferred to play for the Rockets during the 2020–21 season.

Miller played three seasons for the Rockets and averaged 14.8 points as he helped the team to a 74–25 record. The Rockets won three consecutive league titles in the Mid-American Conference (MAC) during his tenure. Miller was named to the All-MAC second-team in 2023 and third-team in 2022.

== Professional career ==
After going undrafted in the 2023 NBA draft, Millner joined the San Antonio Spurs for the 2023 NBA Summer League and on September 15, 2023, they signed him to a two-way contract. However, he was waived on September 30.

On August 5, 2024, Millner signed a one-year contract with Kauhajoki Karhu of the Korisliiga.

== Personal life ==
On April 30, 2022, Millner's father, Setric Sr., was fatally wounded in a Little Rock shooting. Murder charges against the suspect were dropped due to a lack of witnesses.
