= Stefan Janković (basketball) =

Serbian-Canadian basketball player

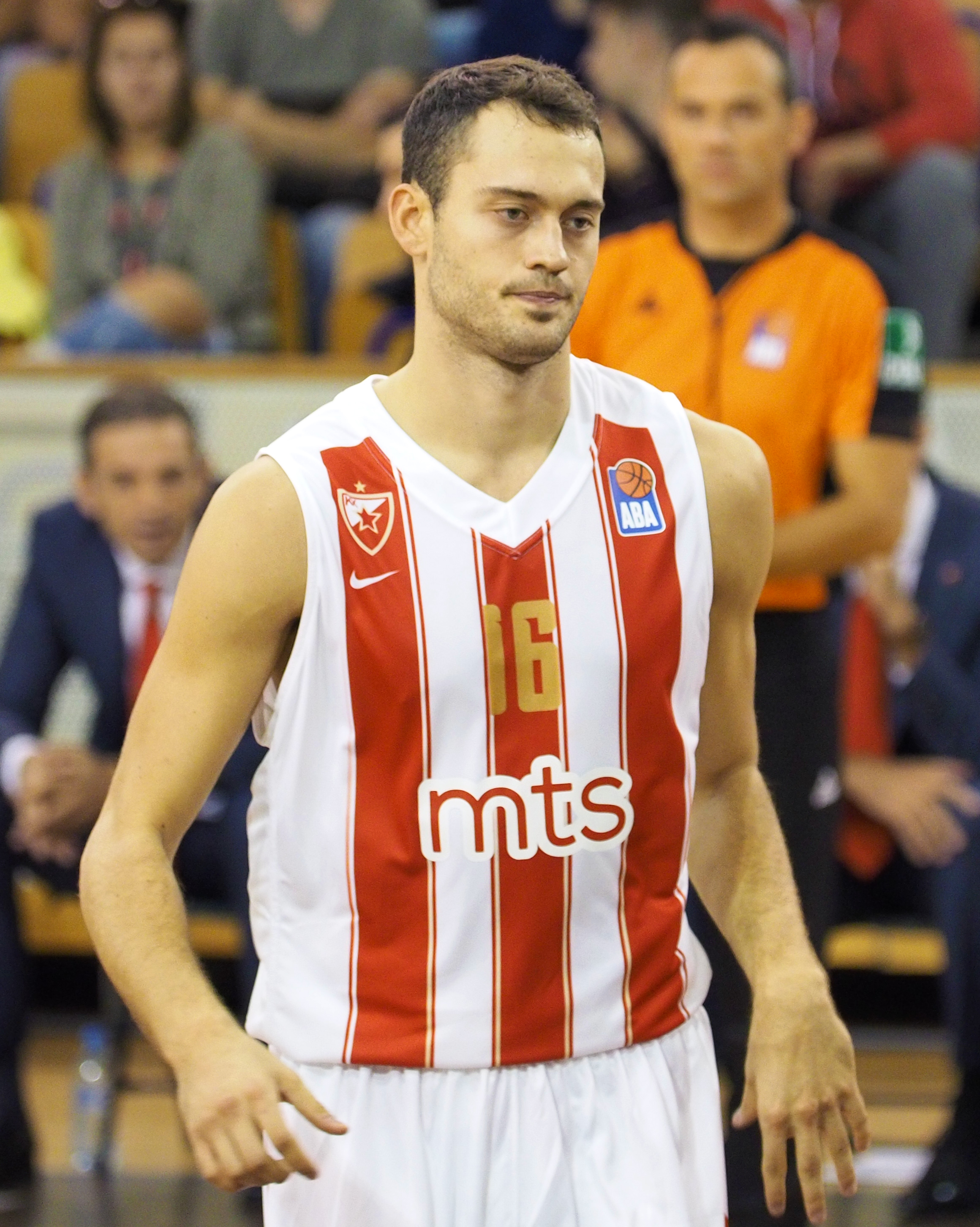
- Janković with KK Crvena zvezda (2017)

No. 33 – Yankey Ark
- Position: Power forward / center
- League: P. League+

Personal information
- Born: August 4, 1993 (age 33) Belgrade, FR Yugoslavia
- Listed height: 6 ft 11 in (2.11 m)
- Listed weight: 240 lb (109 kg)

Career information
- High school: St. Francis Xavier (Mississauga, Ontario); The Kiski School (Saltsburg, Pennsylvania); Huntington Prep (Huntington, West Virginia)
- College: Missouri (2012–2014); Hawaii (2014–2016)
- NBA draft: 2016: undrafted
- Playing career: 2016–present

Career history
- 2016–2017: Sioux Falls Skyforce
- 2017: Erie BayHawks
- 2017–2018: Crvena zvezda
- 2018–2021: Partizan
- 2019–2020: →AEK Athens
- 2020: →Capital City Go-Go
- 2021: →Bahçeşehir Koleji
- 2021–2022: Tsmoki-Minsk
- 2022: Formosa Taishin Dreamers
- 2024: Formosa Dreamers
- 2025: Calgary Surge
- 2026: Nadim Souaid Academy
- 2026: Taipei Fubon Braves
- 2026: Shahrdari Gorgan
- 2026–present: Yankey Ark

Career highlights
- Serbian League champion (2018); Serbian Cup winner (2019); AP Honorable Mention All-American (2016); Big West Player of the Year (2016); First-team All-Big West (2016)
- Stats at Basketball Reference

Stefan Janković (Serbian Cyrillic: Стефан Јанковић; born August 4, 1993) is a Serbian-Canadian professional basketball player for the Yankey Ark of the P. League+. He played two seasons of college basketball for the Hawaii Rainbow Warriors where he was named the Big West Conference Player of the Year in 2016.

== Early life ==
Stefan was born on August 4, 1993, in Belgrade, FR Yugoslavia to Drago and Aida Janković. His family was from the region formerly known as Yugoslavia. Both of his parents were brought up in Sarajevo, Bosnia and Herzegovina and his grandparents were raised in Montenegro. As a result of the violence during the breakup of Yugoslavia, Stefan's parents moved to Belgrade, where there was less instability. In 1997, when Stefan was four years of age, they moved to Mississauga, Ontario, Canada, following Drago's brother's footsteps.

Stefan came to Mississauga with experience only as a soccer player, but a basketball court was located near his house in Canada. In turn, he played on the court with a wide variety of opponents. His family moved to a predominantly Serbian community. In turn, Janković did not speak English even at eight years of age. Stefan spent most of his time taking care of his younger brother at their apartment, while his parents were busy.

== High school career ==
Janković began playing high school basketball with St. Francis Xavier Secondary School in Mississauga. After his freshman season, he was averaging 33 points and 10 rebounds per game. For the following year, he transferred to The Kiski School in Saltsburg, Pennsylvania, where he averaged 17 points and eight rebounds in his sophomore season. In one notable performance, he recorded a quadruple-double of 18 points, 12 rebounds, 10 assists, and 10 blocks. As a junior with Kiski, Janković averaged 22 points, about 10 rebounds, and eight assists. For his final season, he transferred to Huntington Prep School in Huntington, West Virginia. He became one of the top 50 players of his level in the United States, averaging 9.5 points, 7.1 rebounds, 3.2 assists, and 1.1 blocks. Janković played with stars such as Andrew Wiggins, future NBA player Sim Bhullar, and future college teammate Negus Webster-Chan. On October 28, 2011, Janković chose to play college basketball with the University of Missouri. Other options he was considering included Louisville, Northwestern, Miami, Penn State, West Virginia, and Xavier. He commented on his decision, "It was honestly just feeling more comfortable. It was really close, but I felt more comfortable."

== College career ==
As a freshman, Janković started two games and averaged 3.0 points and 1.4 rebounds in 7.9 minutes per game. At the end of the season, he elected to transfer. “I want to thank everyone at Missouri, my teammates, the coaching staff, the administration, and the fans,” Jankovic said in a statement. “This was a tough decision for me, and Missouri will always hold a special place in my heart, but this was about having the opportunity to find a better fit where I could play a larger role on the court. I am looking forward to my next opportunity and want to wish everyone at Mizzou all the best this year.”

In his junior year at Hawaii, Janković averaged 15.7 points, 6.8 rebounds and 1.3 blocked shots per game. Twice named Big West Player of the Week, he scored in excess of 20 points eight times and scored a career-high 34 points against Cal State Northridge on February 18. Jankovic had five double-doubles, which tied the league high. At the conclusion of the regular season he was named Big West Player of the Year and First Team All-Big West.

== Professional career ==
=== Sioux Falls Skyforce (2016–17) ===
After going undrafted in the 2016 NBA draft, Janković joined the Miami Heat for the 2016 NBA Summer League. On July 13, 2016, he signed with the Heat, but was later waived on October 17 after appearing in one preseason game. On November 1, 2016, he was acquired by the Sioux Falls Skyforce of the NBA Development League as an affiliate player of the Heat.

=== Erie BayHawks (2017) ===
On March 1, 2017, Janković was traded to the Erie BayHawks.

=== Crvena Zvezda (2017–18) ===
On July 29, 2017, Janković signed a three-year deal with Serbian club Crvena zvezda. Over 26 ABA League games, he averaged 5.5 points and 3 rebounds per game. However, Crvena zvezda came up short to defending the title in the ABA League, as they lost in the final series to Budućnost Podgorica. In the EuroLeague, he made 28 appearances and averaged 3.8 points and 2.5 rebounds on 38.9% shooting from the field goal. He eventually won the Serbian League with Crvena zvezda at the end of the season.

After the end of the season, Janković decided to part ways with Crvena zvezda even though he was under contract with them, with both parties having different views on his contract status. His contract status was since then under review by the Basketball Federation of Serbia and FIBA.

=== Partizan (2018–2020) ===
On October 22, 2018, Partizan announced that Janković was added to their roster for the 2018–2019 season.

==== Loans ====
On August 26, 2019, AEK Athens welcomed Janković via their Twitter account and Janković was reported to be with AEK Athens for the 2019–20 season. On January 14, 2020, the Capital City Go-Go announced that they had added Janković off of waivers. On March 11, Janković was waived due to a season-ending injury. He averaged 5.0 points and 2.5 rebounds in 15 games for the Go-Go. On February 1, 2021, he has signed with Bahçeşehir Koleji of the Turkish Basketball Super League (BSL).

=== Tsmoki-Minsk (2021–2022) ===
On July 29, 2021, Janković signed with Tsmoki-Minsk of the Belarusian Premier League. He averaged 10 points and 4.1 rebounds per game.

=== Formosa Taishin Dreamers (2022) ===
On January 10, 2022, Janković signed with Formosa Taishin Dreamers of the P. League+.

On May 2, 2023, Janković signed with Vancouver Bandits of the Canadian Elite Basketball League, but he never played any games for them.

=== Formosa Dreamers (2024) ===
On August 23, 2024, Janković signed a testing player contract with Formosa Dreamers of the Taiwan Professional Basketball League (TPBL), his second stint with the franchise. On November 16, his contract was terminated.

=== Calgary Surge (2025) ===
On April 16, 2025, Janković signed a one year contract with Calgary Surge of the Canadian Elite Basketball League.

== Personal life ==
Janković considers himself to be Serbian-Canadian as he was born in Serbia but raised in Canada and appreciates the opportunity Canada gave him and his family. Currently he hasn't committed to any national team as he stated he was undecided and still considering representing either Serbia or Canada.

Janković's maternal grandfather formerly played for the Yugoslavia national soccer team. Additionally, he has a younger brother, Andreas.

== See also ==
- List of Serbian NBA Summer League players
