= Trevor Thompson (basketball) =

American basketball player (born 1994)

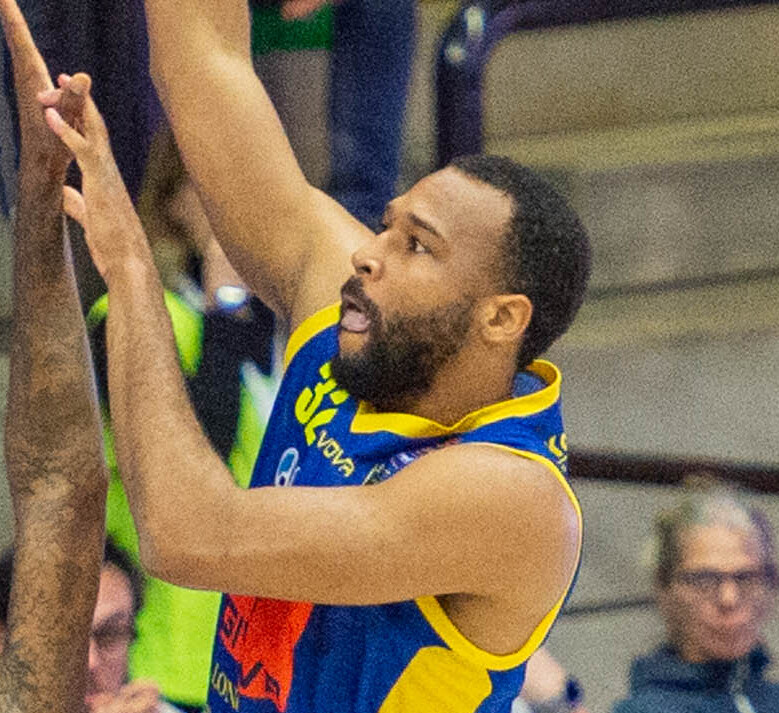
- Thompson in 2023

No. 32 – Yankey Ark
- Position: Center
- League: P. League+

Personal information
- Born: June 12, 1994 (age 32) Long Island, New York, U.S.
- Listed height: 7 ft 0 in (2.13 m)
- Listed weight: 250 lb (113 kg)

Career information
- High school: Ben Davis (Indianapolis, Indiana); SJNMA (Delafield, Wisconsin)
- College: Virginia Tech (2013–2014); Ohio State (2015–2017)
- NBA draft: 2017: undrafted
- Playing career: 2017–present

Career history
- 2017–2018: Santa Cruz Warriors
- 2018–2019: Antibes Sharks
- 2019: Antwerp Giants
- 2019–2020: Pieno žvaigždės Pasvalys
- 2020: Tuři Svitavy
- 2020–2021: Kangoeroes Mechelen
- 2021: Polski Cukier Toruń
- 2021–2022: Zadar
- 2022–2023: Scafati
- 2023–2024: Peristeri
- 2024: Tofaş
- 2024–2025: Shenzhen Leopards
- 2025: Shijiazhuang Xianglan
- 2025–2026: Qingdao Eagles
- 2026: Hangzhou Jingwei
- 2026–present: Yankey Ark

Career highlights
- PBL rebounding leader (2021)
- Stats at Basketball Reference

Trevor Carter Thompson (born June 12, 1994) is an American professional basketball for Yankey Ark of the Taiwanese P. League+. He played collegiate for Ohio State University.

== College career ==
As a freshman at Virginia Tech, Thompson averaged 5.0 points and 4.7 rebounds per game. He had 15 points and six rebounds against Duke. After the season, he decided to transfer to Ohio State, choosing the Buckeyes over offers from Indiana, Butler, and Purdue. He averaged 6.5 points and 5.1 rebounds per game as a sophomore and explored professional options before returning to Ohio State. As a junior at Ohio State, Thompson averaged 10.6 points and 9.2 rebounds per game and earned honorable mention All-Big Ten honors. Following the season, he decided to forgo his final season of eligibility to turn professional.

== Professional career ==
=== Santa Cruz Warriors (2017–2018) ===
After going undrafted in the 2017 NBA draft, Thompson was included in the Boston Celtics roster for 2017 NBA Summer League. On October 13, 2017, Thompson was signed with the Golden State Warriors, but was waived three days later.

On October 31, 2017, Thompson was included in the 2017-18 opening night roster for the Santa Cruz Warriors of the NBA G League.

=== Antibes Sharks (2018–2019) ===
On August 23, 2018, Thompson signed with the Antibes Sharks of the Pro A.

=== Antwerp Giants (2019) ===
Thompson signed with the Antwerp Giants of the Belgian League on January 24, 2019.

=== Pieno žvaigždės Pasvalys (2019–2020) ===
At the beginning of 2019–20 season, he signed with Pieno žvaigždės Pasvalys of the Lithuanian Basketball League (LKL). He averaged 7.1 points and 6.6 rebounds per game.

=== Tuři Svitavy (2020) ===
On March 4, 2020, he signed with Tuři Svitavy of the Czech Národní Basketbalová Liga (NBL).

=== Kangoeroes Basket Mechelen (2020–2021) ===
On May 24, 2020, Thompson signed with Kangoeroes Mechelen of the Belgian Pro Basketball League.

=== Polski Cukier Toruń (2021) ===
On July 27, 2021, Thompson signed with Polski Cukier Toruń of the Polish Basketball League (PLK). In 12 games, he averaged 15.2 points, 8.4 rebounds, and 1.1 assists per game.

=== Zadar (2021–2022) ===
On November 26, 2021, Thompson signed with Zadar in the Croatian League and ABA League.

=== Scafati Basket (2022–2023) ===
On August 4, 2022, he signed with Scafati Basket of the Italian Lega Basket Serie A.

=== Peristeri (2023–2024) ===
On July 6, 2023, Thompson signed with Greek club Peristeri.

=== Tofaş (2024) ===
On August 9, 2024, he signed with Tofaş of Basketbol Süper Ligi (BSL).

== Personal life ==
Thompson is the son of former Major League Baseball player Ryan Thompson.
