= Cam McGriff =

American basketball player (born 1997)

- McGriff with Andorra in 2026

No. 0 – BC Andorra
- Position: Small forward / power forward
- League: Liga ACB

Personal information
- Born: September 30, 1997 (age 29) Grand Prairie, Texas, U.S.
- Listed height: 6 ft 7 in (2.01 m)
- Listed weight: 220 lb (100 kg)

Career information
- High school: South Grand Prairie (Grand Prairie, Texas)
- College: Oklahoma State (2016–2020)
- NBA draft: 2020: undrafted
- Playing career: 2020–present

Career history
- 2020–2021: Okapi Aalst
- 2021–2022: Greensboro Swarm
- 2021–2022: Portland Trail Blazers
- 2022: Capitanes de Arecibo
- 2022–2023: AEK Athens
- 2023: Le Mans
- 2023–2024: Memphis Hustle
- 2024: Indiana Mad Ants
- 2024: Santeros de Aguada
- 2024: Indios de Mayagüez
- 2024–2025: Indiana Mad Ants
- 2025–2026: Salt Lake City Stars
- 2026: Hangzhou Jingwei
- 2026: Yankey Ark
- 2026–present: BC Andorra

Career highlights
- Greek League All-Star (2022)
- Stats at NBA.com
- Stats at Basketball Reference

Cameron Nathaniel McGriff (born September 30, 1997) is an American professional basketball player for BC Andorra of the Liga ACB. He played college basketball for the Oklahoma State Cowboys.

== Early life ==
McGriff grew up mainly playing flag football. His parents, Octavia Goodman and Nate McGriff, were separated, with his father working three jobs. He began focusing on basketball as he grew taller and could dunk by sixth grade. McGriff attended South Grand Prairie High School in Grand Prairie, Texas. As a senior, he averaged 14.3 points and 7.4 rebounds per game. He was ranked the 10th best recruit in Texas by ESPN and the No. 113 in his high school class by Rivals. McGriff committed to playing college basketball for Oklahoma State, choosing the Cowboys over Arkansas in part because he thought they would help him reach the NBA.

== College career ==
As a freshman, McGriff averaged 3.8 points and 3.1 rebounds in 15.7 minutes per game while showcasing his dunking ability, including a dunk against Georgetown that appeared on SportsCenter's Top 10. Before his sophomore season, he improved his jump shot, making 1,000 shots each day. As a sophomore, he averaged 8.4 points and 5.4 rebounds per game and helped the team reach the National Invitational Tournament quarterfinals. In November 2018, McGriff scored 28 points in a win against LSU.

As a junior, McGriff averaged 12.3 points and 7.4 rebounds per game, shooting 38 percent. On February 22, 2020, he tied his career-high of 28 points and had seven rebounds in a 83–66 win over Oklahoma. He averaged 12.3 points and 6.6 rebounds per game as a senior on a team that finished 18–14. McGriff averaged 19 points per game on the final six games of the season and was named the team's most valuable player by the Tulsa World. He was also named All-Big 12 Honorable Mention.

== Professional career ==
=== Okapi Aalst (2020–2021) ===
On June 14, 2020, McGriff signed his first professional contract with Okapi Aalst of the Pro Basketball League (PBL) in Belgium. He left the team after the season after averaging 13.4 points and 4.9 rebounds per game in the PBL.

=== Greensboro Swarm / Portland Trail Blazers (2021–2022) ===
On October 8, 2021, McGriff signed with the Charlotte Hornets, but was waived six days later. On October 24, he signed with the Greensboro Swarm as an affiliate player. In 14 games, McGriff averaged 10.2 points, 4.9 rebounds and 1.4 assists per game.

On December 25, 2021, McGriff signed a 10-day contract with the Portland Trail Blazers via the hardship exception. He appeared in three games for the Trail Blazers, averaging 4.7 points and 5.0 rebounds per game. On January 2, 2022, McGriff entered the NBA's COVID-19 health and safety protocols.

On January 5, McGriff was reacquired by the Greensboro Swarm. On January 31, he was suspended for one game without pay for leaving the bench during an altercation between the Swarm and the Wisconsin Herd two days earlier.

=== Capitanes de Arecibo (2022) ===
On April 21, 2022, McGriff signed with the Capitanes de Arecibo of the BSN.

=== AEK Athens (2022–2023) ===
On July 19, 2022, McGriff signed a one-year contract with Greek club AEK Athens. On February 27, 2023, McGriff parted ways with the club. He averaged 9.1 points and 4.8 rebounds in domestic competition, as well as 6 points and 3.9 rebounds in the BCL.

=== Le Mans (2023) ===
On February 27, 2023, McGriff signed with Le Mans of the French Pro A.

=== Memphis Hustle (2023–2024) ===
On October 30, 2023, McGriff joined the Memphis Hustle.

=== Indiana Mad Ants (2024) ===
On March 5, 2024, McGriff was traded to the Indiana Mad Ants.

=== Santeros de Aguada (2024) ===
On April 9, 2024, McGriff signed with the Santeros de Aguada.

=== Indios de Mayagüez (2024) ===
On June 10, 2024, McGriff signed with the Indios de Mayagüez after leaving Aguada.

=== Indiana Mad Ants (2024–2025) ===
On August 23, 2024, McGriff signed with the Indiana Pacers, but was waived three days later. On October 27, he joined the Indiana Mad Ants.

=== MoraBanc Andorra (2026–present) ===
On July 24, 2026, McGriff signed with MoraBanc Andorra of the Liga ACB.

== Career statistics ==
Legend
GP	Games played	GS	Games started	MPG	Minutes per game
FG%	Field goal percentage	3P%	3-point field goal percentage	FT%	Free throw percentage
RPG	Rebounds per game	APG	Assists per game	SPG	Steals per game
BPG	Blocks per game	PPG	Points per game	**Bold**	Career high

=== NBA ===
Year	Team	GP	GS	MPG	FG%	3P%	FT%	RPG	APG	SPG	BPG	PPG
2021–22	Portland	3	0	15.3	.357	.333	1.000	5.0	1.0	.0	.3	4.7
Career		3	0	15.3	.357	.333	1.000	5.0	1.0	.0	.3	4.7

=== College ===
Year	Team	GP	GS	MPG	FG%	3P%	FT%	RPG	APG	SPG	BPG	PPG
2016–17	Oklahoma State	32	1	15.7	.405	.286	.730	3.1	.6	.5	.3	3.8
2017–18	Oklahoma State	**36**	17	24.1	**.480**	**.368**	**.865**	5.4	1.0	.8	.5	8.4
2018–19	Oklahoma State	32	**32**	**33.8**	.381	.298	.764	**7.4**	**1.7**	**1.2**	**.8**	**12.3**
2019–20	Oklahoma State	32	**32**	30.1	.450	.308	.832	6.6	1.3	.4	.3	**12.3**
Career		132	82	25.9	.427	.313	.802	5.6	1.1	.7	.5	9.2
