= Richard Chang (Costco) =

Taiwanese American businessman

- Born: 1964 (age 61–62); Taiwan
- Education: University of California, Berkeley
- Employer: Costco
- Height: 6 ft 6 in (1.98 m)

Chinese name
- Traditional Chinese: 張嗣漢
- Hanyu Pinyin: Zhāng Sìhàn
- Wade–Giles: Chang^{1} Ssŭ^{4}-han^{4}

Richard Chang (Chinese: 張嗣漢; born 1964) is a Taiwanese American businessman and retired basketball player who is the commissioner of the P. League+. After playing collegiate basketball for UC Berkeley and representing Taiwan in international basketball tournaments in the 1980s, he joined Costco and rose to the position of senior vice president and regional manager for Asia.

== Early life and education ==
Chang was born in Taiwan in 1964, and moved to Southern California at the age of four with his family. He grew up in Huntington Beach and attended Edison High School, where he was a forward on the school basketball team and a teammate of Rick DiBernardo. His senior year, Chang was named to the All-CIF 4A first team, which also included Jay Bilas and Kerry Boagni. He also joined the track and field team, where he set the school's junior varsity men's high jump record of 6'6" in 1980.

== Basketball career ==
Chang went on to the University of California, Berkeley on an NCAA scholarship from 1982 to 1986. He credits Golden Bears basketball coach Lou Campanelli for instilling a strong work ethic in him during those years. He did not play during the 1983–1984 season due to an anterior cruciate ligament injury. During his final season on the team in 1985–1986, Chang averaged 3.5 points per game, including one match in which he scored eight points against UCLA. He was the only Taiwan-born Division I player at the time. Later sources sometimes nicknamed him "the Jeremy Lin of the 1980s".

Chang was invited to Taiwan in 1985 to play for the Chinese Taipei men's national basketball team, as a member of which he led the team to victory over the Japanese and South Korean teams in the 1985 and 1988 William Jones Cups. He also played semi-professionally in Taiwan for McDonald's (now Pauian Archiland Basketball Team) while holding down a day job at a trading company, but quit after less than three years because he found that the league was insufficiently competitive and that he no longer enjoyed playing basketball as a result.

== Business career ==
After retiring from basketball, Chang moved back to the United States, and then worked briefly in Southeast Asia for a US company. In 1995 he returned to Taiwan in order to set up a local subsidiary of Costco. His height and large build continued to serve him well in business. On one occasion, Chang was seated next to Chinatrust Commercial Bank executive Jeffrey Koo, Jr. on a flight. Koo, himself taller than average, was impressed to meet someone so much bigger than himself, and struck up a conversation with Chang to ask whether he played basketball. This chance acquaintance paved the way for Costco Taiwan to offer a promotional credit card with Chinatrust. In August 2015, Chang was promoted to senior vice president of Costco for the Asia region.

In November 2023, Chang was appointed the first commissioner of the P. League+.

== Personal life ==
Chang is involved with efforts to help local basketball players develop other careers after retirement. He is also the president of the Berkeley Club of Taiwan. His Chinese-language self-help book Coaching Yourself was published in July 2017 by Reading Times. He enjoys swimming, and wakes up early most mornings to go to the pool before work.

Chang is married and has two sons. He is a cousin of physicist Stephen Hsu.

== Publications ==
- 張嗣漢 [Richard Chang]; 熊明德 [Hsiung Ming-teh] (July 2017). 教練自己: 從球場到職場COSTCO亞太區總裁張嗣漢的工作原則和人生態度 [Coaching Yourself: Costco Asia CEO Richard Chang's Career Principles and Attitude Towards Life, from the Basketball Court to the Workplace]. 時報文化出版 [Reading Times Publishing]. ISBN 9789571369723.
