= Jarrod Jones =

American-born Hungarian basketball player (born 1990)

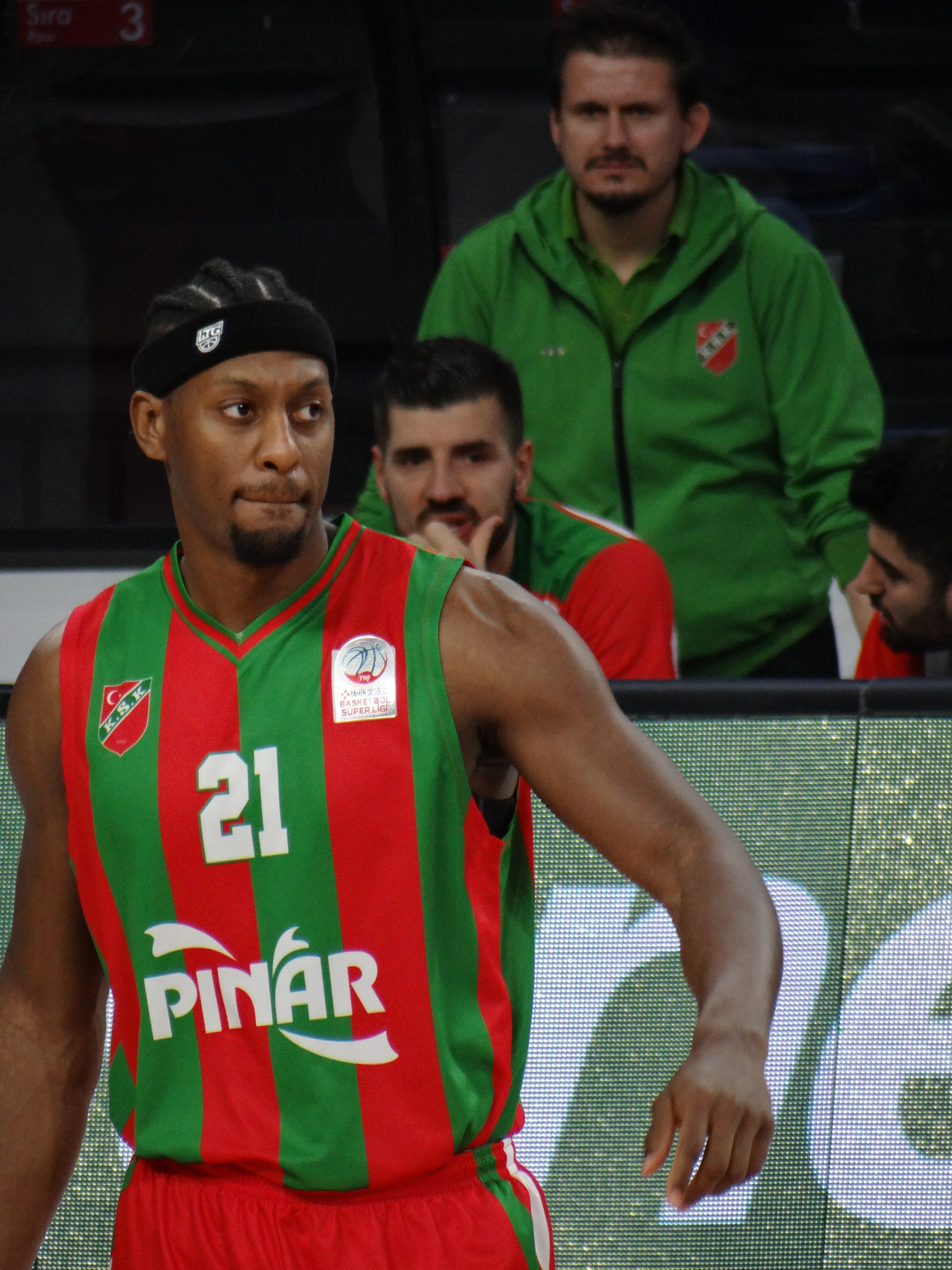
- Jones with Pınar Karşıyaka in 2018

No. 45 – Ulsan Hyundai Mobis Phoebus
- Position: Power forward
- League: Korean Basketball League

Personal information
- Born: May 27, 1990 (age 36) Michigan City, Indiana, U.S.
- Listed height: 6 ft 9 in (2.06 m)
- Listed weight: 232 lb (105 kg)

Career information
- High school: Michigan City (Michigan City, Indiana)
- College: Ball State (2008–2012)
- NBA draft: 2012: undrafted
- Playing career: 2012–present

Career history
- 2012–2013: Kyiv
- 2013: Alba Fehérvár
- 2013–2015: Paks Atomerőmű
- 2015–2016: JA Vichy
- 2016: Szolnoki Olaj
- 2016–2017: VL Pesaro
- 2017–2018: Pınar Karşıyaka
- 2018–2019: Monaco
- 2019–2020: Darüşşafaka
- 2020–2021: Cedevita Olimpija
- 2021–2022: Zhejiang Guangsha Lions
- 2022: Joventut Badalona
- 2022–2023: Suwon KT Sonicboom
- 2023: Hapoel Haifa
- 2023: Goyang Sono Skygunners
- 2024: Türk Telekom
- 2024–2025: Taoyuan Pauian Pilots
- 2025–2026: Sharjah SC
- 2026–present: Ulsan Hyundai Mobis Phoebus

Career highlights
- P. League+ champion (2025); Slovenian League champion (2021); 2x Hungarian League champion (2013, 2016)

Jarrod Michael Jones (born May 27, 1990) is an American-born Hungarian professional basketball player for Ulsan Hyundai Mobis Phoebus of the Korean Basketball League (KBL). He played college basketball for the Ball State Cardinals.

== College career ==
During the four years he played in NCAA for Ball State University, Jarrod Jones was named to the All Mac team during the 2010–11 season. He averaged 13 points and 8 rebounds per game.

== Professional career ==
Jones played in the NBA Summer League with Sacramento Kings for the 2012–13 season.

Jones signed a contract in Europe with BC Budivelnyk and later with two clubs in Hungary (Alba Fehérvár and Atomerőmű SE), where he played for two seasons.

He started the 2015–16 season with JA Vichy in the French LNB Pro B and then returned in Hungary with Szolnoki Olaj KK, where he won the championship.

On July 3, 2016, Jones signed a contract with the Italian basketball team Victoria Libertas Pesaro, and he will take part to the 2016–17 LBA season. On May 8, 2017, he signed with Guizhou of China for the 2017 NBL season.

On August 2, 2017, Jones signed with Turkish club Pınar Karşıyaka for the 2017–18 season. Jones averaged 17 points and 6.1 rebounds per game in the Turkish League. He signed a deal with French team AS Monaco Basket on August 20, 2018.

On July 28, 2019, he has signed a contract with Turkish Darüşşafaka of the Turkish Basketbol Süper Ligi.

On September 25, 2020, Jones signed a contract with the Slovenian team Cedevita Olimpija. He averaged 11.7 points, 5.2 rebounds, and 1.6 assists per game.

On December 24, 2021, Jones signed with the Zhejiang Guangsha Lions of the Chinese Basketball Association.

On October 6, 2022, Jones signed a one-month contract with Spanish team Joventut Badalona. On December 22, he joined the Suwon KT Sonicboom of the Korean Basketball League (KBL) to replace E.J. Anosike. On April 2, 2023, Jones signed with Hapoel Haifa of the Israeli Basketball Premier League.

On August 1, 2023, Jones signed with the Goyang Sono Skygunners of the Korean Basketball League (KBL). On November 13, he was replaced by Chinanu Onuaku. On January 2, 2024, Jones signed with Türk Telekom of the Turkish Basketbol Süper Ligi (BSL).

On August 14, 2024, Jones signed with Taoyuan Pauian Pilots of the P. League+.

== Career statistics ==
=== FIBA Champions League ===
| Year | Team | GP | MPG | FG% | 3P% | FT% | RPG | APG | SPG | BPG | PPG |
|---|---|---|---|---|---|---|---|---|---|---|---|
| 2017–18 | Karsiyaka | 18 | 33.7 | .529 | .400 | .794 | 6.6 | 2.2 | 0.8 | 0.7 | 18.8 |
