= Will Artino =

Taiwanese-American basketball player

No. 31 – Rizing Zephyr Fukuoka
- Position: Center
- League: B.League

Personal information
- Born: June 27, 1992 (age 34) Des Moines, Iowa, U.S.
- Listed height: 210 cm (6 ft 11 in)
- Listed weight: 111 kg (245 lb)

Career information
- High school: Des Moines Christian (Des Moines, Iowa); Waukee (Waukee, Iowa)
- College: Creighton (2010–2014)
- NBA draft: 2015: undrafted
- Playing career: 2015–present

Career history
- 2015–2016: AVIS UTILITAS Rapla
- 2016–2017: Horsens IC
- 2017–2018: APOP Paphos
- 2018: Phoenix Galați
- 2018–2019: Formosa Dreamers
- 2019: Al-Muharraq
- 2019–2020: Kuala Lumpur Dragons
- 2020: Panteras de Aguascalientes
- 2021: Hebraica Macabi
- 2021–2022: Tainan TSG GhostHawks
- 2022–2024: Hsinchu Toplus Lioneers
- 2024: Macau Black Bears
- 2024–2025: Kesatria Bengawan Solo
- 2025–2026: Taoyuan Pauian Pilots
- 2026–present: Rizing Zephyr Fukuoka

Career highlights
- P. League+ champion (2026); P. League+ Sixth Man of the Year (2026); All-IBL First Team (2025); All-IBL Defensive Team (2025); IBL All-Star (2025); IBL All-Star MVP (2025); T1 League rebounds leader (2022)

William Joseph Artino (born June 27, 1992) is a Taiwanese-American professional basketball player for the Rizing Zephyr Fukuoka of the B.League.

== Early life ==
Artino was born in Des Moines, Iowa. In July 2008, he transferred to the public high school in nearby Waukee because his parents could no longer afford the tuition at Des Moines Christian School. Altino played baseball for three years in high school. On February 5, 2010, Artino scored 25 points, 14 rebounds, and 10 blocks in a game against West Des Moines Valley High School. Upon entering college, Artino played as a redshirt for Creighton University's 2010–11 season.

== Professional career ==
Artino began his professional career playing for AVIS UTILITAS Rapla in Rapla, Estonia for the 2015-2016 season. In his second professional season, he played for Horsens IC in Horsens, Denmark for the 2016-2017 season.

In January 2018, Artino joined the Romanian Liga Națională team Phoenix Galați. On September 13 that year, he arrived in Taiwan to play for the Formosa Dreamers, a team competing in the ASEAN Basketball League (ABL) at the time.

On July 3, 2019, Artino was confirmed to be leaving the Dreamers due to the front office failing to properly secure his work visa, meaning he would be unable to work in Taiwan for the next three years. On July 5, he opted to join the Bahraini Premier League's Al-Muharraq SC. On August 2, he helped al-Muharraq to win the 2019 season-opening Zain Super Cup with a 28-point, 21-rebound double-double, and was voted the game's Most Valuable Player. On October 10, Artino joined returned to the ABL, this time playing for the Kuala Lumpur Dragons.

On March 13, 2020, the ABL announced that the 2019–20 season would be indefinitely postponed due to COVID-19 pandemic, after which the Dragons terminated their contract with Artino.

On August 22, 2020, Artino joined the Panteras de Aguascalientes of the Mexican National Basketball League (LNBP). The Panteras terminated their contract with Artino on September 28.

On December 24, 2021, Artino signed with Tainan TSG GhostHawks of the T1 League. He was the T1 League's rebounds leader for the 2021–22 season.

Artino joined the Hsinchu Lioneers of the P. League+ for the 2022–23 season. His contract with the Hsinchu Lioneers expired in January 2024.

In September 2024, Artino joined the Macau Black Bears of the East Asia Super League (EASL) for the 2024–25 season.

In November 2024, Artino joined the Kesatria Bengawan Solo of the Indonesian Basketball League (IBL) for the 2025 season.

On July 25, 2026, Artino signed with the Rizing Zephyr Fukuoka of the B.League.

== National team career ==
On November 3, 2021, Artino became the second naturalized player for Chinese Taipei. On December 20, he received the national identification card.
