= Treveon Graham =

American basketball player (born 1993)

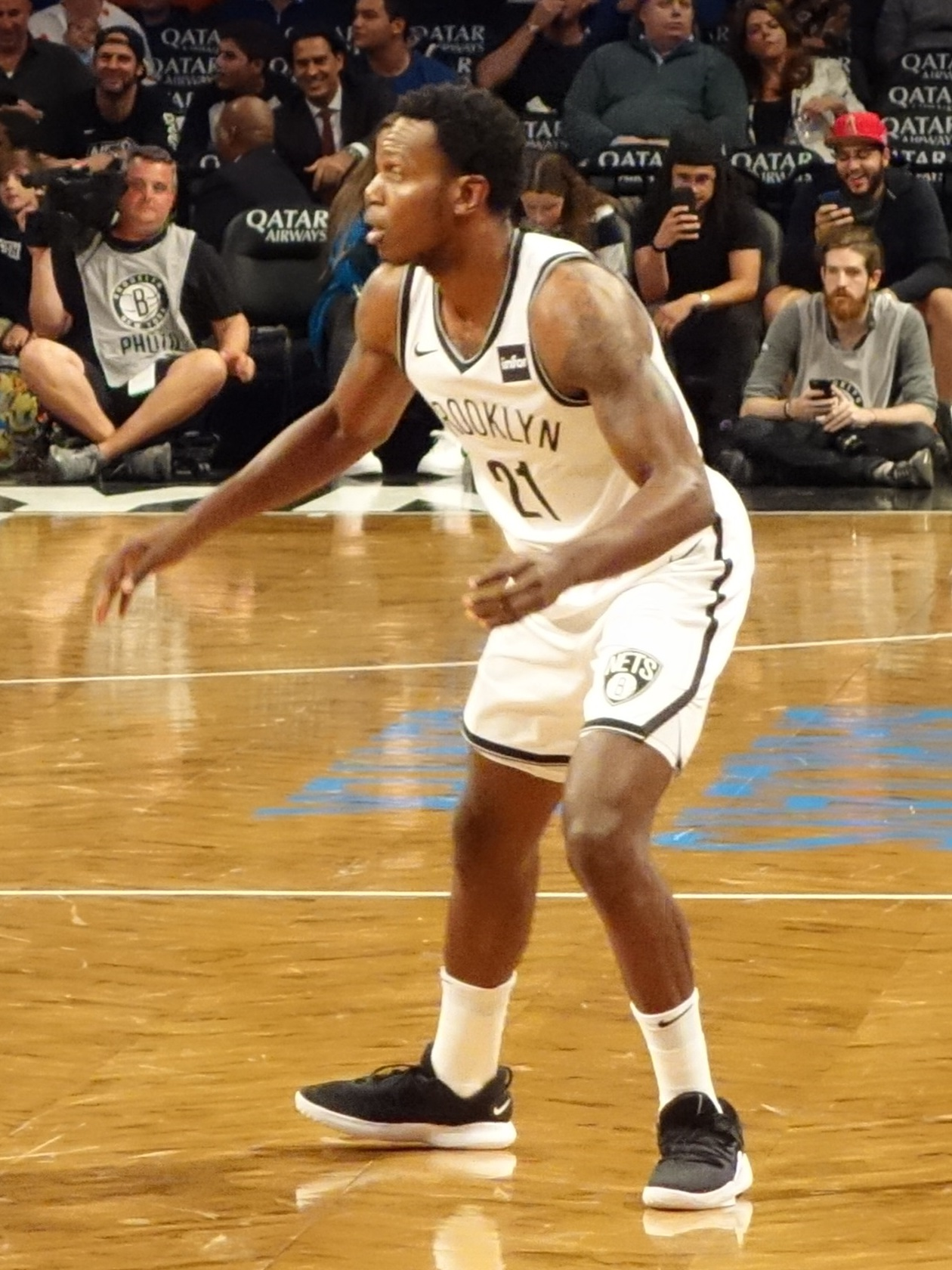
- Graham with the Brooklyn Nets in 2018

No. 24 – Taoyuan Pauian Pilots
- Position: Shooting guard / small forward
- League: P. League+

Personal information
- Born: October 28, 1993 (age 33) Washington, D.C., U.S.
- Listed height: 6 ft 5 in (1.96 m)
- Listed weight: 219 lb (99 kg)

Career information
- High school: St. Mary's Ryken (Leonardtown, Maryland)
- College: VCU (2011–2015)
- NBA draft: 2015: undrafted
- Playing career: 2015–present

Career history
- 2015–2016: Idaho Stampede
- 2016–2018: Charlotte Hornets
- 2018–2019: Brooklyn Nets
- 2019: →Long Island Nets
- 2019–2020: Minnesota Timberwolves
- 2020: Atlanta Hawks
- 2022–2023: Long Island Nets
- 2023: Montreal Alliance
- 2023–2024: Motor City Cruise
- 2024–present: Taoyuan Pauian Pilots

Career highlights
- 2× P. League+ champion (2025, 2026); 2× First-team All-Atlantic 10 (2014, 2015); Second-team All-Atlantic 10 (2013); Atlantic 10 tournament MVP (2015)
- Stats at NBA.com
- Stats at Basketball Reference

Treveon Dominique Graham (born October 28, 1993) is an American professional basketball player for the Taoyuan Pauian Pilots of the P. League+. He played college basketball for the VCU Rams.

== High school career ==
Graham played high school basketball at St. Mary's Ryken High School in Leonardtown, Maryland for Head Coach Dave Tallman, where as a senior he was named to the Washington Post All-Met team for the Washington D.C. area after averaging 21.5 points and 12 rebounds per game. Graham chose to play for coach Shaka Smart at VCU after also considering Boston College, Clemson, Cincinnati, Cleveland State and Northeastern.

== College career ==
As a freshman at Virginia Commonwealth University, Graham became a part of the Rams' regular rotation and averaged 7.0 points and 3.2 rebounds per game. Prior to the start of his sophomore season, he was chosen by Sports Illustrated as the most likely "breakout sophomore" in the nation, based on statistical analysis of his performance in limited minutes as a freshman. Graham's performance did improve significantly in his second season, raising his averages to 15.1 points and 5.8 rebounds as a full-time starter. His performance was good enough to earn him second team All-Atlantic 10 honors.

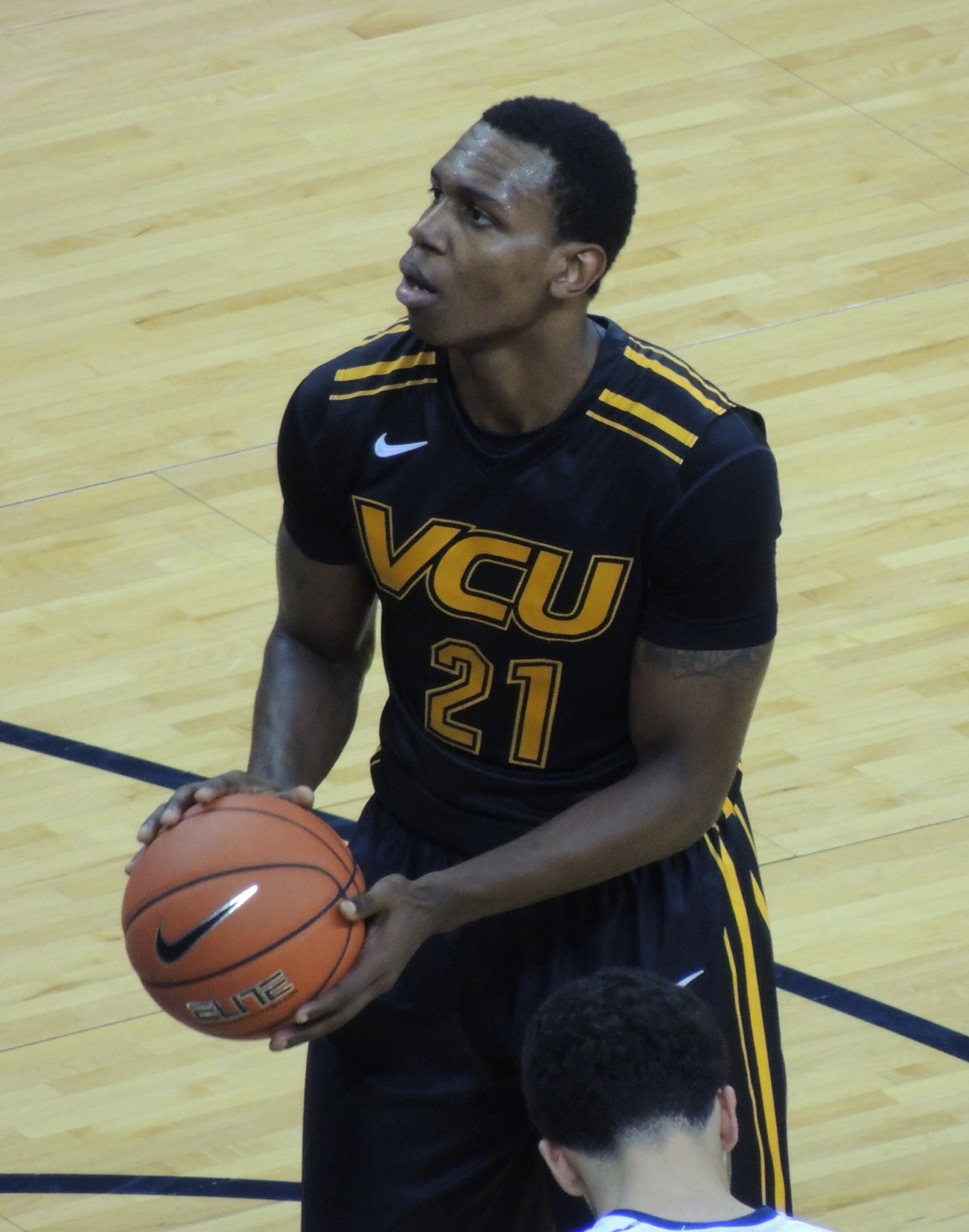
Graham with the VCU Rams in 2013

After his sophomore season, Graham was chosen for USA Basketball's entry to the 2013 Summer Universiade in Kazan, Russia. He started 5 games for Team USA, averaging 9.4 points and 6.8 rebounds per game.

Prior to the 2013–14 season, Graham was named first team preseason All-Atlantic 10 as VCU was named the preseason favorite to win the league. VCU entered the season ranked 14th in the preseason AP Poll. The Rams scored a key early season road victory, beating 25th ranked Virginia on November 12 in Charlottesville, Virginia. Graham led all scorers with 22 points, including the game-winning three-pointer with just over a second remaining.

As a senior in 2014–15, Graham averaged 16.2 points and 7.1 rebounds in 33 games. Despite being affected by a lingering ankle injury for large parts of the season, Graham helped VCU in many ways. He led VCU in scoring, rebounding, and three-pointers made. He was also their leading scorer during the A-10 tournament where VCU won their first conference tournament in the Atlantic 10 despite qualifying as the fifth seed.

During Graham's college career he averaged 13.4 points, 5.8 rebounds and 1.4 assists in 25.4 minutes per game.

== Professional career ==
=== Idaho Stampede (2015–2016) ===
After going undrafted in the 2015 NBA draft, Graham joined the San Antonio Spurs for the 2015 NBA Summer League. On August 17, 2015, he signed with the Utah Jazz. However, he was later waived by the Jazz on October 20 after appearing in two preseason games. On November 1, he was acquired by the Idaho Stampede of the NBA Development League as an affiliate player of the Jazz. In 46 games for the Stampede in 2015–16, he averaged 15.7 points, 6.1 rebounds and 1.6 assists per game.

=== Charlotte Hornets (2016–2018) ===
In July 2016, Graham joined the Orlando Magic white team for the Orlando Summer League and the Utah Jazz for the Las Vegas Summer League. On July 26, 2016, he signed with the Charlotte Hornets. In his second game for the Hornets on November 7, 2016, Graham scored his first NBA points when he knocked down a three-pointer from the left wing during a 122–100 win over the Indiana Pacers. On April 10, 2017, he scored a career-high 14 points in an 89–79 loss to the Milwaukee Bucks. On June 29, 2018, the Hornets announced that they would decline a qualifying offer to Graham, making him a free agent.

=== Brooklyn Nets (2018–2019) ===
On July 30, 2018, Graham signed with the Brooklyn Nets. On the season, Graham appeared in 35 games, scoring 5.3 points per game. During the season, he was sidelined for two months with a hamstring injury. Graham did a rehab stint with the Long Island Nets before returning to Brooklyn.

=== Minnesota Timberwolves (2019–2020) ===
On July 7, 2019, Graham was sent to the Golden State Warriors as part of a trade package for Kevin Durant. The following day, Graham and Shabazz Napier were traded to the Minnesota Timberwolves in exchange for the draft rights to Lior Eliyahu.

=== Atlanta Hawks (2020) ===
On January 16, 2020, Graham, along with Jeff Teague, was traded to the Atlanta Hawks in exchange for Allen Crabbe.

=== Long Island Nets (2022–2023) ===
On January 25, 2022, Graham was acquired off waivers by the Long Island Nets.

=== Montreal Alliance (2023) ===
On May 2, 2023, Graham signed with the Montreal Alliance of the Canadian Elite Basketball League. With Montreal, Graham averaged 14.6 points and 9.3 rebounds per game. He finished second in the CEBL in rebounding behind Simi Shittu of the Calgary Surge.

=== Motor City Cruise (2023–2024) ===
On October 21, 2023, Graham signed with the Detroit Pistons, but was waived the same day. Nine days later, he joined the Motor City Cruise. However, he was waived on January 26, 2024.

=== Taoyuan Pauian Pilots (2024–present) ===
On February 7, 2024, Graham signed with the Taoyuan Pauian Pilots of the P. League+. On July 31, he re-signed with the Taoyuan Pauian Pilots.

On August 31, 2025, Graham once more re-signed with the Pilots.

== Career statistics ==
Legend
GP	Games played	GS	Games started	MPG	Minutes per game
FG%	Field goal percentage	3P%	3-point field goal percentage	FT%	Free throw percentage
RPG	Rebounds per game	APG	Assists per game	SPG	Steals per game
BPG	Blocks per game	PPG	Points per game	**Bold**	Career high

=== NBA ===
==== Regular season ====
Year	Team	GP	GS	MPG	FG%	3P%	FT%	RPG	APG	SPG	BPG	PPG
2016–17	Charlotte	27	1	7.0	**.475**	**.600**	.667	.8	.2	.2	.0	2.1
2017–18	Charlotte	**63**	2	16.7	.434	.412	.695	1.9	.9	**.5**	.0	4.3
2018–19	Brooklyn	35	**21**	**20.4**	.335	.297	**.818**	**3.1**	**1.0**	.4	**.2**	**5.3**
2019–20	Minnesota	33	20	20.1	.354	.241	.730	3.0	.9	**.5**	.1	5.2
2019–20	Atlanta	22	0	12.1	.373	.351	.474	2.3	.7	.3	**.2**	3.3
Career		180	44	16.0	.383	.333	.691	2.2	.8	.4	.1	4.2

==== Playoffs ====
Year	Team	GP	GS	MPG	FG%	3P%	FT%	RPG	APG	SPG	BPG	PPG
2019	Brooklyn	5	0	15.8	.200	.000	.500	2.2	.6	.4	.2	1.4

=== College ===
Year	Team	GP	GS	MPG	FG%	3P%	FT%	RPG	APG	SPG	BPG	PPG
2011–12	VCU	**36**	0	16.8	.389	.313	.633	3.2	.6	.8	**.3**	7.0
2012–13	VCU	**36**	**36**	27.6	**.450**	.366	**.732**	5.8	1.6	**.9**	.1	15.1
2013–14	VCU	35	33	28.3	.437	.337	.694	7.0	**2.0**	**.9**	.2	15.8
2014–15	VCU	33	33	**29.4**	.428	**.381**	.691	**7.1**	1.6	.6	**.3**	**16.2**
Career		140	102	25.4	.432	.354	.691	5.8	1.4	.8	.2	13.4
