= FIBA eligibility rules =

Rules to determine if a player can represent a country

As the governing body of basketball, FIBA is responsible for maintaining and implementing the rules that determine whether a basketball player is eligible to represent a particular country in officially recognized international competitions. Any player with legal nationality the country they seek to represent are generally eligible to play for that country's national team but FIBA provides specific provisions for players who have acquired their legal nationality, dual citizens, and players representing FIBA members which are dependencies of another country.

== Eligibility ==
Eligibility rules imposed by FIBA on national team players applies to both men and women. A player who seeks to represent a country must hold legal nationality of that country.

In 3x3 basketball, a player is eligible to represent their country if they have the appropriate legal nationality. The eligibility could be proven through a passport obtained at any age.

The method by which a player obtains nationality is generally irrelevant to national team eligibility. The so-called grandparent rule is only used to determine a player's eligibility for a team representing a dependent territory of a sovereign nation, such as Puerto Rico or the US Virgin Islands. In those cases, the player must hold nationality of the applicable sovereign nation, called the "main territory" in FIBA regulations (the United States in both named cases), and must have been either:

1. born in the dependent territory;
2. born in the main territory, with at least one parent having been born in the dependent territory;
3. born to parents who were both born in the dependent territory (regardless of the player's birthplace); or
4. have at least one grandparent born in the dependent territory (again, regardless of the player's birthplace).

Additionally, a player can gain eligibility for a dependent territory's team by gaining the nationality of the main territory, plus residing in the dependent territory for at least 4 years.

A player who has competed in an official FIBA competition after reaching age 17 is tied to that country. Those who played for one country before turning 17 may play for a different country if both countries' federations agree, with the FIBA Secretary General deciding if the federations do not agree. FIBA has an exception that allows the Secretary General to authorize a nationality change to a player's "country of origin" (i.e., a country where the player has recent ancestral roots) if it is "in the interest of the development of basketball in the country".

The application of this exception received criticism from ESPN journalist Michael Voepel in 2021 after two American-born players of Nigerian origin, Nneka Ogwumike and Elizabeth Williams, were denied a waiver that would have allowed them to play for Nigeria in the Tokyo Olympics. While both had competed with the USA in previous competitions, with Ogwumike having won two World Cup gold medals with Team USA, neither had recent USA experience, and USA Basketball had released both to play for their ancestral home. In addition, Ogwumike's younger sisters Chiney and Erica, also US-born, were expected to play for Nigeria at those Olympics (in the end, only Erica was on the final Nigeria roster). In discussing the "development of basketball" exception to the standard eligibility rules, Voepel remarked,

How about the development of basketball on an entire continent? FIBA Africa is the only one of FIBA's five confederations that has never won an Olympic medal in men's or women's basketball. Wouldn't the opportunity to have two former WNBA All-Stars and collegiate All-Americans play for the country where their parents were born -- and for which they have dual citizenship and have frequently visited -- make sense in terms of both Nigerian and African basketball development?

=== Naturalized players ===
Foreign-born players with bloodline connection with the country they want to represent must prove their legal nationality through a passport obtained before turning age 16, regardless of any local laws that deem that nationality as having existed before that time. Players who obtained their passport afterwards can still play but they would be considered as "naturalized" players by FIBA rather than as a local. FIBA allows one naturalized player to be on the roster of a national team per game.

== Application in non-FIBA tournaments ==
In May 2018, the basketball federations in the Micronesia region decided to adopt FIBA eligibility rules for basketball players participating in the Micronesian Games. Previously the players in the games were subjected to seven-year residency requirement for non-Micronesians and a three-year residency term for islanders. The change generally restricts citizens of Federated States of Micronesia and Palau from playing for the Marshall Islands and would allow any United States passport holders to play for Guam and the Northern Marianas.

The Olympic Council of Asia does not enforce FIBA eligibility rules when it comes to naturalized players and dual citizens in the Asian Games. However it requires players to reside in the country they seek to represent for at least three years. The eligibility could be claimed by a passport of at least three years of validity. The OCA only allows one player with no bloodline to play for a national team in the Asian Games.

== Proposed reform ==
According to Al Panlilio, the president of the Philippines' national federation Samahang Basketbol ng Pilipinas, the dominance of Australia and New Zealand in the 2018 FIBA Asia Under-18 Championship gave way for possible reform on FIBA eligibility rules. Panlilio said that FIBA Asia might be concerned about maintaining balance in its competition while stated that the federation's position is that Filipino dual citizens should be allowed to play as locals regardless of when they were issued passports as long as their bloodline with their country could be proven.
