= Yankey Ark =

- Leagues: P. League+
- Founded: 2025; 1 year ago
- History: Yankey Ark; 2025–present
- Arena: Hsinchu Municipal Gymnasium
- Location: Hsinchu, Taiwan
- Team colors: Mint, white, black
- General manager: David Chien Wei-cheng
- Head coach: Sebastian Machowski
- Ownership: Yankey Engineering
- Championships: 0
Home	Away

Yankey Ark (Chinese: 洋基工程方舟) is a professional basketball team based in Hsinchu, Taiwan. They have been part of the P. League+ since 2025.

== History ==
On August 21, it was announced that the team would join the P.LEAGUE+ and become the league's new fourth team. On September 2, the team's general manager was announced as Qian Weicheng. On October 13, a press conference was held and the team name was officially announced as "Yankey Ark Professional Basketball Team". On October 15, the team's first head coach, Li Yihua, was announced.

== Current roster ==
Yankey Ark roster
Players
Coaches

Pos.	No.	Nat.	Name	Ht.	Wt.	Age	From
G	0	(Taiwan)	Lin Bing-sheng	1.85 m (6 ft 1 in)	75 kg (165 lb)	30 – 29 July 1996	Chinese Culture
G	1	(Taiwan)	Jian Wei-lun	1.87 m (6 ft 2 in)	81 kg (179 lb)	28 – 29 July 1998	Vanung
G	2	(United States)	Jamarcus Mearidy (I)	1.84 m (6 ft 0 in)	87 kg (192 lb)	29 – 6 September 1997	Grand Canyon
G	5	(Taiwan)	Li Han-sheng	1.77 m (5 ft 10 in)	76 kg (168 lb)	33 – 24 October 1993	NTNU
G	6	(Taiwan)	Wang Ding-jun	1.80 m (5 ft 11 in)	84 kg (185 lb)	22 – 24 August 2004	Chien Hsin
PF	7	(The Gambia)	Joof Alasan (FS)	2.05 m (6 ft 9 in)	109 kg (240 lb)	24 – 8 January 2002	NTUA
G/F	8	(United States)	Victor Hart	1.98 m (6 ft 6 in)	92 kg (203 lb)	25 – 14 February 2001	Southern Mississippi
F	12	(Taiwan)	Lee Chia-jul	2.00 m (6 ft 7 in)	97 kg (214 lb)	21 – 16 March 2005	Peking
PG	13	(Taiwan)	Kao Wei-lun	1.85 m (6 ft 1 in)	80 kg (176 lb)	24 – 15 December 2001	Vanung
PF	15	(Taiwan)	Lin Chih-wei	2.00 m (6 ft 7 in)	95 kg (209 lb)	34 – 10 July 1992	Chinese Culture
PF	21	(Taiwan)	Lu Kuan-tin	1.97 m (6 ft 6 in)	102 kg (225 lb)	34 – 13 October 1992	NTUA
F/C	24	(United States) (Nigeria)	Morris Udeze	2.03 m (6 ft 8 in)	109 kg (240 lb)	26 – 13 December 1999	New Mexico
SF	27	(Taiwan)	Chang Chen-ya	1.94 m (6 ft 4 in)	90 kg (198 lb)	27 – 13 October 1999	NCCU
C	32	(United States)	Trevor Thompson	2.13 m (7 ft 0 in)	120 kg (265 lb)	32 – 12 June 1994	Ohio State
SF	00	(Taiwan)	Warren Yeh	1.95 m (6 ft 5 in)	88 kg (194 lb)	21 – 17 April 2005	AAMU

Head coach

- (Germany) Sebastian Machowski

Assistant coach(es)

- (Germany) Stephen Arigbabu
- (Taiwan) Tang Wei-Chieh

Legend

- (C) Team captain
- (I) Import player
- (FS) Foreign student player
- (HP) Heritage player
- (FA) Free agent
- (DP) Unsigned draft pick
- (AI) EASL Asian import
- (S) Suspended
- Injured

- Roster
Updated: 2026 October 20

== Season-by-season record ==
P. League+
Season	Coach	Regular Season				Post Season			
Season	Coach	Won	Lost	Win %	Finish	Won	Lost	Win %	Result
2025–26	Lee Yi-hua	0	0	–	NA	0	0	–	
Totals		0	0	–	–	0	0	–	0 Playoff Appearances
