= Taoyuan Pauian Pilots =

Professional basketball team in Taiwan

- 2024–25 Taoyuan Pauian Pilots season
- Leagues: P. League+ East Asia Super League
- Founded: 8 July 2020; 6 years ago
- History: Taoyuan AirApe; July 8 – November 1, 2020; Taoyuan Pilots; November 1, 2020 – 2022; Taoyuan Pauian Pilots; 2022 – present
- Arena: Taoyuan Arena
- Capacity: 8,700
- Location: Taoyuan, Taiwan
- Team colors: Orange, navy blue, gold
- President: Li Chung-Shu
- General manager: Li Chung-Shu
- Head coach: Iurgi Caminos
- Ownership: Pauian Archiland
- Championships: 2 PLG: 2 (2025, 2026)
- Website: www.taoyuanpilots.tw

Taoyuan Pauian Pilots (Chinese: 桃園璞園領航猿) is a professional basketball team based in Taoyuan, Taiwan. They have been part of the P. League+ since the 2020–21 season.

== History ==
In 2020, following the establishment of P. League+, Super Basketball League team Taoyuan Pauian Archiland split in two, with one joining the P. League+ and rebranded to Taoyuan AirApe. The AirApe became one of the four teams of the inaugural P. League+ season.

On November 1, 2020, the AirApe was renamed to Taoyuan Pilots, named for Taiwan's international airport in the city. On October 6, 2022, the team added its sponsor's name, Pauian Archiland Construction, now known as the Taoyuan Pauian Pilots.

== Honours ==
=== Domestic ===
- P. League+
  - Champion (2): 2025, 2026
  - Runner-up (1): 2024

=== Continental ===
- East Asia Super League
  - Runner-up (2): 2024–25, 2025–26
- Basketball Champions League Asia - East
  - Runner-up (2): 2025 Basketball Champions League Asia – East, 2026 Basketball Champions League Asia – East
- Basketball Champions League Asia
  - Quarter finals (1): 2025 Basketball Champions League Asia

== Facilities ==
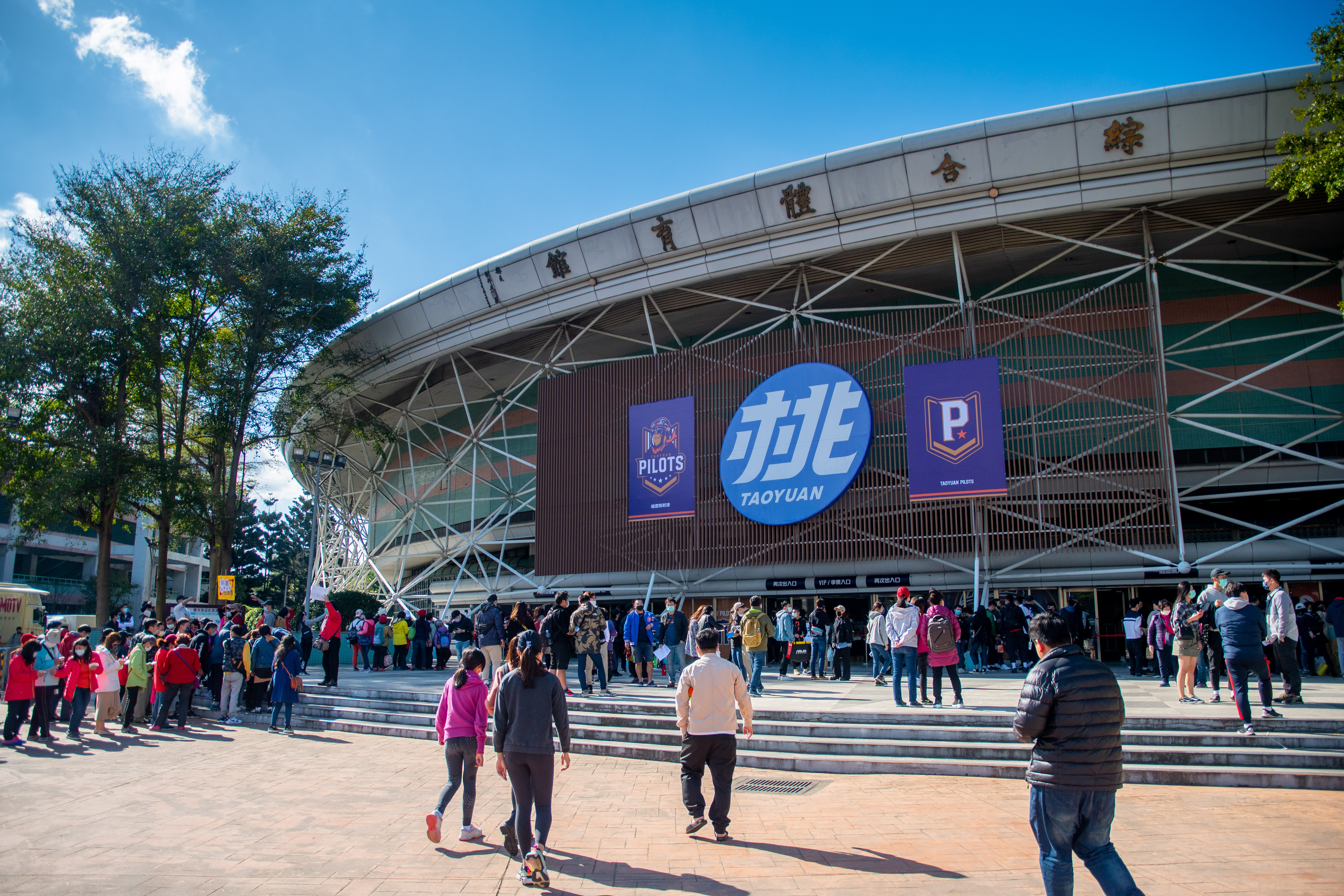
Taoyuan Arena served as the Pilots' home arena since 2020.

=== Home arenas ===
| Arena | Location | Duration |
|---|---|---|
| Taoyuan Arena | Taoyuan City | 2020–present |
| NTSU Multipurpose Gymnasium | Taoyuan City | 2021–2022 |
| Nanshan High School Gymnasium | New Taipei City | 2021–2022 |

== Roster ==
Taoyuan Pauian Pilots roster
Players
Coaches

| Pos. | No. | Nat. | Name | Ht. | Wt. | DOB (YYYY-MM-DD) | From |
|---|---|---|---|---|---|---|---|
| C | 1 | (Senegal) | Amdy Dieng (FS) | 2.07 m (6 ft 9 in) | 105 kg (231 lb) | 28 – 1 August 1998 | NCCU |
| G | 2 | (Taiwan) | Chen Yu-Jui | 1.85 m (6 ft 1 in) | 75 kg (165 lb) | 30 – 22 December 1995 | NTSU |
| G | 6 | (Taiwan) | Kuan Ta-You | 1.81 m (5 ft 11 in) | 89 kg (196 lb) | 28 – 15 September 1997 | NTSU |
| F | 7 | (Taiwan) | Chiao Chu-Yu | 2.00 m (6 ft 7 in) | 98 kg (216 lb) | 25 – 28 September 2000 | Fu Jen |
| G | 10 | (Taiwan) | Lin Tzu-Wei | 1.88 m (6 ft 2 in) | 82 kg (181 lb) | 26 – 12 May 2000 | NKNU |
| G | 12 | (Taiwan) | Li Chia-Kang | 1.85 m (6 ft 1 in) | 85 kg (187 lb) | 27 – 16 October 1998 | NTSU |
| C | 21 | (United States) | Alec Brown (I) | 2.16 m (7 ft 1 in) | 107 kg (236 lb) | 34 – 23 July 1992 | Green Bay |
| F | 24 | (United States) | Treveon Graham (I) | 1.98 m (6 ft 6 in) | 100 kg (220 lb) | 32 – 28 October 1993 | VCU |
| C | 25 | (Taiwan) | Lin Cheng | 2.02 m (6 ft 8 in) | 102 kg (225 lb) | 26 – 25 July 2000 | NTSU |
| G | 30 | (Taiwan) | Pai Yao-Cheng | 1.84 m (6 ft 0 in) | 72 kg (159 lb) | 27 – 2 February 1999 | I-Shou |
| F | 45 | (United States) | Jarrod Jones (I) | 2.06 m (6 ft 9 in) | 104 kg (229 lb) | 36 – 27 May 1990 | Ball State |
| G | 69 | (Taiwan) | Lu Chun-Hsiang | 1.90 m (6 ft 3 in) | 82 kg (181 lb) | 29 – 15 July 1997 | Fu Jen |

Head coach

- (Spain) Iurgi Caminos

Assistant coach(es)

- (Taiwan) Chen Shih-Chieh
- (Taiwan) Huang Chi-Feng
- (Taiwan) Tang Wei-Jie
- (Taiwan) Yang I-Feng

Strength & conditioning coach(es)

- (Taiwan) Liu Hou-Shao
- (Taiwan) Liu Nien-Chieh

Athletic trainer(s)

- (Taiwan) Peng Li-Chen
- (Taiwan) Wu Yun-Kai

Legend

- (C) Team captain
- (I) Import player
- (FS) Foreign student player
- (HP) Heritage player
- (FA) Free agent
- (DP) Unsigned draft pick
- (AI) EASL Asian import
- (S) Suspended
- Injured

- Roster
Updated: September 11, 2024

== Season-by-season record ==
P. LEAGUE+
| Season | Coach | Regular season | | | | Postseason | | | |
| Season | Coach | Won | Lost | Win % | Finish | Won | Lost | Win % | Result |
|---|---|---|---|---|---|---|---|---|---|
| 2020–21 | Liu I-Hsiang | 10 | 14 | .417 | 2nd | 2 | 3 | .400 | Lost playoffs to Formosa Taishin Dreamers, 2–3 |
| 2020–21 | Yang I-Feng | 10 | 14 | .417 | 2nd | 2 | 3 | .400 | Lost playoffs to Formosa Taishin Dreamers, 2–3 |
| 2021–22 | Cheng Chih-Lung | 7 | 22 | .241 | 6th | Did not qualify | | | |
| 2021–22 | Yen Hsing-Su | 7 | 22 | .241 | 6th | Did not qualify | | | |
| 2022–23 | Iurgi Caminos | 19 | 21 | .475 | 3rd | 0 | 3 | .000 | Lost playoffs to Taipei Fubon Braves, 0–3 |
| 2023–24 | Iurgi Caminos | 26 | 14 | .650 | 1st | 5 | 6 | .455 | Won playoffs vs Hsinchu Toplus Lioneers, 4–2; Lost finals to New Taipei Kings, 1–4 |
| 2024–25 | Iurgi Caminos | 18 | 6 | .750 | 1st | 4 | 3 | .571 | Won finals vs Taipei Fubon Braves, 4–3 |
| 2025–26 | Iurgi Caminos | 21 | 3 | .875 | 1st | 4 | 3 | .571 | Won finals vs Taipei Fubon Braves, 4–3 |
| Totals | | 101 | 80 | .558 | - | 15 | 18 | .455 | 5 playoff appearances |

East Asia Super League
| Season | Coach | Group stage | | | | Final Four/Final Six | | | |
| Season | Coach | Won | Lost | Win % | Finish | Won | Lost | Win % | Result |
|---|---|---|---|---|---|---|---|---|---|
| 2024–25 | Iurgi Caminos | 4 | 2 | .667 | 2nd | 1 | 1 | .500 | Won semifinals vs Ryukyu Golden Kings, 71-64; Lost finals to Hiroshima Dragonflies, 68-72 |
| 2025–26 | Iurgi Caminos | 4 | 2 | .667 | 2nd | 2 | 1 | .667 | Won quarterfinals vs Seoul SK Knights, 89-69; Won semifinals vs Alvark Tokyo, 102-76; Lost finals to Utsunomiya Brex, 81-90 |
| Totals | | 8 | 4 | .667 | - | 3 | 2 | .600 | 1 Final Four (2025) and 1 Final Six (2026) appearances |

Basketball Champions League Asia - East
| Season | Coach | Group stage | | | | Final Four/Final Six | | | |
| Season | Coach | Won | Lost | Win % | Finish | Won | Lost | Win % | Result |
|---|---|---|---|---|---|---|---|---|---|
| 2025 | Iurgi Caminos | 6 | 0 | 1.000 | 1st | 1 | 1 | .500 | Won semifinals vs New Taipei Kings, 81-62; Lost finals to Khasin Khuleguud, 77-86 |
| 2026 | Iurgi Caminos | 6 | 0 | 1.000 | 1st | 2 | 2 | .500 | Won vs Hi-Tech, 104-75; Lost to South China, 103-110; Won semifinals vs Dewa United Banten, 100-86; Lost finals to South China, 103-113 |
| Totals | | 12 | 0 | 1.000 | - | 3 | 3 | .500 | 1 Final Four (2025) and 1 Final Six (2026) appearances |

Basketball Champions League Asia
| Season | Coach | Group stage | | | | Playoffs | | | |
| Season | Coach | Won | Lost | Win % | Finish | Won | Lost | Win % | Result |
|---|---|---|---|---|---|---|---|---|---|
| 2025 | Iurgi Caminos | 1 | 1 | .500 | 2nd in Group C | 0 | 1 | .500 | Lost quarterfinals to Shabab Al Ahli, 77-86 |
| Totals | | 1 | 1 | .500 | - | 0 | 1 | .500 | 1 playoff appearance |
