= FTV One =

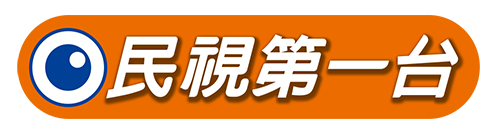
- Country: Taiwan
- Network: Formosa Television

Links
- Website: https://www.facebook.com/FMTV.FTV

FTV One (Chinese: 民視第一台), is a digital television channel operated by Formosa Television (FTV) in Taiwan. It is formerly called Follow Me TV (Chinese: 台灣交通電視台) and aimed to offer realtime traffic information to audiences, especially drivers with TV device on vehicle.
