= P. League+ =

Taiwanese professional basketball league

- Current season, competition or edition: 2026–27 PLG season
- Sport: Basketball
- Founded: 2020
- Founder: Chen Chien-Chou
- First season: 2020–21
- CEO: Chen Chien-Chou (interim)
- President: Li Chung-Shu
- Commissioner: Chen Chien-Chou (interim)
- No. of teams: 4
- Country: Taiwan
- Most recent champion: Taoyuan Pauian Pilots (2nd title)
- Most titles: Taipei Fubon Braves (3 titles)
- Broadcasters: FTV One; MOMOTV
- Website: https://pleagueofficial.com/

The P. League+ (stylized as P. LEAGUE+, abbreviated as PLG), pronounced as Plus League, is a Taiwanese men's professional basketball league founded in 2020.

== History ==
The P. League+ was founded by Blackie Chen in 2020. It is the first fully professional basketball league in Taiwan after the Chinese Basketball Alliance (CBA) ceased operations in 2000. The first four teams participating in the inaugural season were the Formosa Taishin Dreamers, the Hsinchu JKO Lioneers, the Taipei Fubon Braves, and the Taoyuan Pilots. In its second season 2021–22, the P. League+ added two more teams, the New Taipei Kings and the Kaohsiung Steelers.

On June 26, 2024, the P. League+ announced the merger with the T1 League for the 2024–25 season. On July 8, 2024, Kaohsiung 17LIVE Steelers, Taipei Fubon Braves and Taoyuan Pauian Pilots announced to exit the league merger, preferring to stay for the upcoming season. On July 9, TSG GhostHawks announced to exit the merger and join PLG. Formosa Dreamers, Hsinchu Toplus Lioneers and New Taipei Kings announced they will join the newly formed Taiwan Professional Basketball League.

== Teams ==
Team	Location(s)	Arena(s)	Founded	Joined	Map
Taipei Fubon Braves	Taipei City	Taipei Heping Basketball Gymnasium	1982	2020	P. League+ is located in Taiwan
Taoyuan Pauian Pilots	Taoyuan City	Taoyuan Arena	2020		P. League+ is located in Taiwan
TSG GhostHawks	Tainan City	NCKU Chung Cheng Gym	2021	2024	P. League+ is located in Taiwan
Yankey Ark	Hsinchu City	Hsinchu Municipal Gymnasium	2025		P. League+ is located in Taiwan

== Regular season ==
Each team is required to have at least 13 players for the opening roster and maximum 20 players after the registering deadline. Two of the players can either be both heritage players or each a foreign student and a heritage player. Maximum five import players is allowed for the opening roster and four after the registering deadline. Game Day Active Roster requires 14 players that includes up to three import players. Two import players can be on the court at the same time.

Each team plays 40 games, 20 each for home and away. Games are scheduled mainly on weekends and national holidays.

== Playoffs ==
Four of six teams qualify the playoffs. All seeds will play the playoffs series. The winners advance and play in the finals series. All series are best-of-7, which is in a 2-2-1-1-1 format. The seeding is based on each team's regular season record. Home court advantage goes to the higher seed for all series.

== Champions ==
Teams	Win	Loss	Total	Year(s) won	Year(s) runner-up
Taipei Fubon Braves	3	2	5	2021, 2022, 2023	2025, 2026
New Taipei Kings	1	1	2	2024	2023
Formosa Dreamers	0	1	1	—	2021
Hsinchu Toplus Lioneers	0	1	1	—	2022
Taoyuan Pauian Pilots	2	1	3	2025, 2026	2024

== Ticket prices and viewership demographics ==
.

== Notable people ==
=== Presidents and commissioners ===
- Chen Chien-Chou, President from 2020 to 2023
- Li Chung-Shu, President from 2023 to present
- Richard Chang, Commissioner from 2023 to 2024

=== Players ===
Note: Flags indicate national team eligibility at FIBA-sanctioned events. Players may hold other non-FIBA nationalities not displayed.

Criteria

To appear in this section a player must have either:

- Set a club record or won an individual award while at the club
- Played at least one official international match for their national team at any time
- Played at least one official NBA match at any time.

- Will Artino – Played for Chinese Taipei.
- Jeff Ayres – Former NBA player.
- Anthony Bennett – Former NBA player. Played for Canada.
- Keith Benson – Former NBA player.
- Tyler Bey – Former NBA player.
- Sim Bhullar – Former NBA player. 1x Import of the Year.
- Alec Brown – Played for United States.
- Earl Clark – Former NBA player.
- Chang Tsung-Hsien – Played for Chinese Taipei. 1x Most Valuable Player.
- Chen Ching-Huan – Played for Chinese Taipei.
- Chen Kuan-Chuan – Played for Chinese Taipei.
- Chen Yu-Wei – Played for Chinese Taipei.
- Chien Wei-Ju – Played for Chinese Taipei.
- Chien You-Che – Played for Chinese Taipei.
- Chieng Li-Huan – Played for Chinese Taipei.
- Chou Po-Chen – Played for Chinese Taipei.
- Chou Po-Hsun – Played for Chinese Taipei.
- Chou Yi-Hsiang – Played for Chinese Taipei.
- Douglas Creighton – Played for Chinese Taipei.
- Deyonta Davis – Former NBA player.
- Quincy Davis – Played for Chinese Taipei.
- Branden Dawson – Former NBA player.
- Austin Daye – Former NBA player.
- Michael Efevberha – Played for Nigeria.
- Treveon Graham – Former NBA player.
- Manny Harris – Former NBA player.
- Aaron Harrison – Former NBA player.
- Hsieh Zong-Rong – Played for Chinese Taipei.
- Huang Hung-Han – Played for Chinese Taipei.
- Hung Chih-Shan – Played for Chinese Taipei.
- Prince Ibeh – Played for Rwanda.
- Iong Ngai-San – Played for Macau.
- Chris Johnson – Former NBA player. 1x Finals Most Valuable Player.
- Perry Jones – Former NBA player.
- Terrence Jones – Former NBA player.
- Viacheslav Kravtsov – Former NBA player. Played for Ukraine.
- Ricky Ledo – Former NBA player.
- Lee Hsueh-Lin – Played for Chinese Taipei.
- Lee Kai-Yan – Played for Chinese Taipei. 1x Finals Most Valuable Player.
- Lee Te-Wei – Played for Chinese Taipei.
- DeAndre Liggins – Former NBA player.
- Lin Cheng – Played for Chinese Taipei.
- Lin Chih-Chieh – Played for Chinese Taipei.
- Lin Chih-Wei – Played for Chinese Taipei.
- Lin Chun-Chi – Played for Chinese Taipei.
- Jeremy Lin – Former NBA player.
- Lin Yi-Huei – Played for Chinese Taipei.
- Lu Cheng-Ju – Played for Chinese Taipei.
- Lu Chi-Min – Played for Chinese Taipei.
- Lu Chun-Hsiang – Played for Chinese Taipei. 1x Most Valuable Player.
- Devyn Marble – Former NBA player.
- Chris McCullough – Former NBA player.
- Malcolm Miller – Former NBA player.
- Tony Mitchell – Former NBA player.
- Byron Mullens – Former NBA player. 1x Import of the Year.
- Daniel Ochefu – Former NBA player.
- Justin Patton – Former NBA player.
- Peng Chun-Yen – Played for Chinese Taipei.
- Davon Reed – Former NBA player.
- Devin Robinson – Former NBA player.
- Sani Sakakini – Played for Palestine.
- Wayne Selden Jr. – Former NBA player.
- Mike Singletary – 2x Finals Most Valuable Player.
- Su Shih-Hsuan – Played for Chinese Taipei.
- Hasheem Thabeet – Former NBA player.
- Jeremy Tyler – Former NBA player.
- Tien Lei – Played for Chinese Taipei.
- Tsai Wen-Cheng – Played for Chinese Taipei.
- Tseng Hsiang-Chun – Played for Chinese Taipei.
- Tseng Wen-Ting – Played for Chinese Taipei.
- Willie Warren – Former NBA player.
- Jason Washburn – Played for Bulgaria. 1x Import of the Year.
- Thomas Welsh – Former NBA player.
- Julian Wright – Former NBA player.
- Wu Tai-Hao – Played for Chinese Taipei.
- Wu Yung-Sheng – Played for Chinese Taipei.
- Yang Chin-Min – Played for Chinese Taipei. 2x Most Valuable Player.
- Ihor Zaytsev – 1x Import of the Year.
- Stephen Zimmerman – Former NBA player.

== Individual awards ==
=== Finals MVP ===
Season	Player	Team
2021	Mike Singletary	Taipei Fubon Braves
2022	Mike Singletary	Taipei Fubon Braves
2023	Chris Johnson	Taipei Fubon Braves
2024	Lee Kai-Yan	New Taipei Kings
2025	Lu Chun-Hsiang	Taoyuan Pauian Pilots
2026	Alec Brown	Taoyuan Pauian Pilots

== See also ==
- Chinese Basketball Alliance (CBA)
- Chinese Taipei men's national basketball team
- List of basketball leagues
- Sport in Taiwan
- Super Basketball League (SBL)
- T1 League
- Women's Super Basketball League (WSBL)
- Taiwan Professional Basketball League (TPBL)
- Basketball Champions League Asia
- East Asia Super League
