= 2022–23 KK Partizan season =

Serbian basketball club season

Partizan Mozzart Bet
2022–23 season
- ABA League champions
- Roster in April 2023
- President: (Serbia) Ostoja Mijailović
- Head coach: (Serbia) Željko Obradović
- Arena: Štark Arena
- ABA League: Champions
- Serbian League: Withdrew
- EuroLeague: Quarterfinal
- Serbian Cup: Semifinal
- Highest home attendance: 22,198 vs (Serbia) Crvena zvezda Meridianbet (22 June 2023)
- Average home attendance: 17,937 (in EuroLeague); 10,316 (in ABA League)
- Biggest win: 120–67 vs (North Macedonia) MZT Skopje (16 January 2023)
- Biggest defeat: 58–87 vs (Greece) Olympiacos (10 November 2022)
Home	Away
- All statistics correct as of 22 June 2023.

In the 2022–23 season, Partizan competed in the EuroLeague, Adriatic League and Radivoj Korać Cup.

== Players ==
=== Current roster ===
Note: Flags indicate national team eligibility at FIBA-sanctioned events. Players may hold other non-FIBA nationalities not displayed.

Partizan Mozzart Bet roster
Players
Coaches

Pos.	No.	Nat.	Name	Ht.		Age
F/C	1	(Serbia)	Vukčević, Tristan	2.09 m (6 ft 10 in)	100 kg (220 lb)	20 – 11 March 2003
F/C	2	(United States)	LeDay, Zach	2.02 m (6 ft 8 in)	103 kg (227 lb)	29 – 30 May 1994
G	3	(Serbia)	Drezgić, Savo	1.91 m (6 ft 3 in)		16 – 11 August 2006
G	4	(Serbia)	Avramović, Aleksa	1.92 m (6 ft 4 in)	87 kg (192 lb)	28 – 25 October 1994
C	5	(Serbia)	Koprivica, Balša	2.16 m (7 ft 1 in)	109 kg (240 lb)	23 – 1 May 2000
SG	7	(United States)	Punter, Kevin (C)	1.93 m (6 ft 4 in)	81 kg (179 lb)	29 – 25 June 1993
F/C	9	(Serbia)	Smailagić, Alen	2.08 m (6 ft 10 in)	98 kg (216 lb)	22 – 18 August 2000
F	10	(Greece)	Papapetrou, Ioannis	2.06 m (6 ft 9 in)	106 kg (234 lb)	29 – 30 March 1994
PG	11	(Australia)	Exum, Dante	1.96 m (6 ft 5 in)	97 kg (214 lb)	27 – 13 July 1995
SF	21	(United States)	Nunnally, James	2.01 m (6 ft 7 in)	95 kg (209 lb)	32 – 14 July 1990
C	26	(France)	Lessort, Mathias	2.06 m (6 ft 9 in)	112 kg (247 lb)	27 – 29 September 1995
G/F	32	(Serbia)	Trifunović, Uroš	1.99 m (6 ft 6 in)	88 kg (194 lb)	22 – 5 December 2000
SG	33	(Serbia)	Anđušić, Danilo	1.95 m (6 ft 5 in)	92 kg (203 lb)	32 – 22 April 1991
PG	41	(Israel)	Madar, Yam	1.90 m (6 ft 3 in)	82 kg (181 lb)	22 – 21 December 2000

Head coach

- (Serbia) Željko Obradović

Assistant coach(es)

- (Spain) Josep Maria Izquierdo
- (Serbia) Vladimir Androić
- (Serbia) Aleksandar Matović
- (Serbia) Bogdan Karaičić

Strength & conditioning coach(es)

- (Serbia) Predrag Zimonjić

Team manager

- (Serbia) Zoran Savić

Legend

- (C) Team captain
- (R) Reserves
- Injured

- Roster
- Transactions
Updated: June 25, 2023

=== Players with multiple nationalities ===
- (United States) (Serbia) Kevin Punter
- (Serbia) (Sweden) (Greece) Tristan Vukčević

=== Depth chart ===
Pos.	Starting 5	Bench 1	Bench 2	Bench 3
C	Mathias Lessort	Alen Smailagić		Balša Koprivica
PF	Zach LeDay	Ioannis Papapetrou	Tristan Vukčević
SF	James Nunnally	Uroš Trifunović
SG	Kevin Punter	Aleksa Avramović	Danilo Anđušić
PG	Dante Exum	Yam Madar

=== On loan ===
Partizan Mozzart Bet out on loan
Nat.	Player	Position	Team	On loan since
(Serbia)	Nikola Radovanović	SF	(Serbia) Mladost Zemun	November 2022
(Montenegro)	Đorđije Jovanović	SF	(United States) Ontario Clippers	January 2023

=== Roster changes ===
==== In ====
No.	Pos.	Nat.	Name	Moving from		Type	Date	Source
33	SG	(Serbia)	Danilo Anđušić	AS Monaco	(France)	End of contract	30 Jun 2022	
11	G/F	(Australia)	Dante Exum	Barcelona	(Spain)	End of contract	10 July 2022	
21	SF	(United States)	James Nunnally	Maccabi Tel Aviv	(Israel)	End of contract	13 July 2022	
10	SF	(Greece)	Ioannis Papapetrou	Panathinaikos	(Greece)	End of contract	19 July 2022	
12	F/C	(Slovakia)	Vladimír Brodziansky	Bahçeşehir Koleji	(Turkey)	Parted ways	11 November 2022	

==== Out ====
No.	Pos.	Nat.	Name	Moving to		Type	Date	Source
6	SF	(Serbia)	Nemanja Dangubić	Promitheas Patras	(Greece)	End of contract	13 June 2022	
14	SG	(Albania)	Dallas Moore	CSKA Moscow	(Russia)	End of contract	13 June 2022	
–	SG	(United States)	Trey Drechsel	EWE Baskets Oldenburg	(Germany)	End of contract	13 June 2022	
00	SF	(Latvia)	Rodions Kurucs	Real Betis	(Spain)	Parted ways	23 June 2022	
3	SF	(Serbia)	Rade Zagorac	Avtodor Saratov	(Russia)	End of contract	13 July 2022	
11	C	(Serbia)	Dušan Miletić	Bàsquet Girona	(Spain)	Parted ways	24 August 2022	
24	SG	(Slovenia)	Gregor Glas	Cedevita Olimpija	(Slovenia)	Transfer	4 January 2023	
12	PF/C	(Slovakia)	Vladimír Brodziansky	Club Joventut Badalona	(Spain)	End of contract	26 February 2023	

== Competitions ==
=== Overall ===
Competition	Started round	Final position / round	First match	Last match
Adriatic League	Matchday 1	Winners	2 October 2022	22 June 2023
EuroLeague	Matchday 1	Quarterfinal	7 October 2022	10 May 2023
Radivoj Korać Cup	Quarterfinals	Semifinal	15 February 2023	17 February 2023

Updated to match played 11 May 2023
Source: Competitions

=== Overview ===
Competition	Record							
Competition	Pld	W	D	L	PF	PA	PD	Win %
Adriatic League	37	31	0	6	3,267	2,824	+443	83.78
EuroLeague	39	22	0	17	3,313	3,213	+100	56.41
Radivoj Korać Cup	2	1	0	1	166	152	+14	50.00
Total	78	54	0	24	6,746	6,189	+557	69.23

Last updated: 22 June 2023
Source: Competitions

== Pre-season and friendlies ==
Win Loss

5 September 2022	Sloga (Serbia)	83–108	(Serbia) Partizan	Čačak
19:00	Scoring by quarter: 18–26, 24–30, 16–27, 25–25
	Pts: Underwood 14; Rebs: not available Asts: not available	Boxscore	Pts: Vukčević 21; Rebs: Koprivica 17; Asts: Petrović 6	Arena: Borac Hall

6 September 2022	Borac Čačak (Serbia)	94–84	(Serbia) Partizan	Čačak
19:00	Scoring by quarter: 24–23, 25–22, 15–31, 20–18
	Pts: Todorović 16; Rebs: not available Asts: not available	Boxscore	Pts: Punter 19; Rebs: not available Asts: not available	Arena: Borac Hall

9 September 2022	Carplus Fuenlabrada (Spain)	98–83	(Serbia) Partizan	Fuenlabrada
21:00	Scoring by quarter: 26–22, 22–23, 29–19, 21–19
	Pts: Hannah 18; Rebs: not available Asts: not available	Boxscore	Pts: Punter 19; Rebs: not available Asts: not available	Arena: Polideportivo Fernando Martín

11 September 2022	Club Joventut Badalona (Spain)	92–62	(Serbia) Partizan	Badalona
18:30	Scoring by quarter: 17–16, 25–15, 25–22, 25–9
	Pts: Ellenson, Maronka 14; Rebs: not available Asts: not available	Boxscore	Pts: Punter, Petrović 12; Rebs: not available Asts: not available	Arena: Palau Municipal d'Esports de Badalona

13 September 2022	Barcelona (Spain)	75–81	(Serbia) Partizan	Barcelona
19:30	Scoring by quarter: 19–18, 21–16, 22–27, 13–20
	Pts: Caicedo 16; Rebs: not available Asts: not available	Boxscore	Pts: Lessort 19; Rebs: not available Asts: not available	Arena: Palau Blaugrana

14 September 2022	Baxi Manresa (Spain)	96–98	(Serbia) Partizan	Manresa
19:45	Scoring by quarter: 34–22, 19–21, 24–27, 19–28
	Pts: Harding 19; Rebs: not available Asts: not available	Boxscore	Pts: Lessort 19; Rebs: Nunnally 8 Asts: Nunnally 9	Arena: Pavelló Nou Congost

=== VTB Cup ===
22 September 2022	Lokomotiv Kuban (Russia)	70–92	(Serbia) Partizan	Moscow
19:00	Scoring by quarter: 18–21, 14–20, 18–25, 20–26
Arena Sport	Pts: Barford 19; Rebs: Martiuk 6 Asts: Martiuk 5	Boxscore	Pts: Vukčević 17; Rebs: Vukčević, LeDay, Madar 5 Asts: Trifunović, LeDay, Madar 4	Arena: VTB Arena; Attendance: 560; Referees: Aleksey Davydov, Stanislav Valeev, Yaroslav Oreshin

24 September 2022	Zenit Saint Petersburg (Russia)	81–65	(Serbia) Partizan	Moscow
18:30	Scoring by quarter: 23–22, 14–18, 21–13, 23–12
Arena Sport	Pts: Zakharov 16; Rebs: Solomon 9 Asts: Toptunov 4	Boxscore	Pts: Nunnally 18; Rebs: Lessort 6 Asts: Anđušić 7	Arena: VTB Arena; Attendance: 1,101; Referees: Semen Ovinov, Sergey Beliakov, Artem Lavrukhin

25 September 2022	UNICS (Russia)	83–77	(Serbia) Partizan	Moscow
16:00	Scoring by quarter: 22–23, 17–20, 21–19, 23–15
Arena Sport	Pts: Dimitrijević 30; Rebs: Reynolds, Labeyrie 6 Asts: Reynolds, Macon 4	Boxscore	Pts: Trifunović, Papapetrou 12; Rebs: Lessort 11; Asts: Madar 6	Arena: VTB Arena; Attendance: 875; Referees: Aleksey Davydov, Sergey Mikhaylov, Anton Kruglov

== Adriatic League ==
=== Regular season ===
Pos	Team	Pld	W	L	PF	PA	PD	Pts	Qualification or relegation
1	(Basketball Federation of Serbia) Partizan Mozzart Bet	26	24	2	2424	2025	+399	50	Advance to the Playoffs
2	(Basketball Federation of Serbia) Crvena zvezda Meridianbet	26	23	3	2262	1890	+372	49	Advance to the Playoffs
3	(Basketball Federation of Montenegro) Budućnost VOLI	26	18	8	2263	2027	+236	44	Advance to the Playoffs
4	(Basketball Federation of Slovenia) Cedevita Olimpija	26	17	9	2205	2068	+137	43	Advance to the Playoffs
5	(Basketball Federation of Serbia) FMP Meridian	26	14	12	2339	2245	+94	40	Advance to the Playoffs

Source: ABA League

=== Matches ===
Win Loss

2 October 2022 1	Cibona (Croatia)	81–105	(Serbia) Partizan	Zagreb
17:00	Scoring by quarter: 26–25, 15–33, 19–24, 21–23
Arena Sport	Pts: Ljubičić 19; Rebs: Aranitović, Mazalin 5 Asts: Kapusta 15; PIR: Kapusta 20	Report	Pts: Vukčević, Punter, Trifunović 14; Rebs: Vukčević, Anđušić 4 Asts: Exum, Nunnally 5 PIR: Trifunović 24	Arena: Dražen Petrović Basketball Hall; Attendance: 1,500; Referees: Saša Pukl, Sašo Petek, Tomislav Stapić

10 October 2022 2	MZT Skopje Aerodrom (North Macedonia)	74–92	(Serbia) Partizan	Skopje
16:00	Scoring by quarter: 9–25, 23–23, 20–21, 22–23
Arena Sport	Pts: Mićović 18; Rebs: Mićović 5 Asts: Caffey 6 PIR: Caffey 22	Report	Pts: Exum, Nunnally 17; Rebs: Lessort 7 Asts: Nunnally 4 PIR: Nunnally 20	Arena: Jane Sandanski Arena; Attendance: 5,500; Referees: Milan Nedović, Denis Hadžić, Radoš Savović

16 October 2022 3	Partizan (Serbia)	91–82	(Montenegro) SC Derby	Belgrade
21:00	Scoring by quarter: 23–17, 21–26, 20–21, 27–18
Arena Sport	Pts: Lessort 19; Rebs: Madar 6 Asts: Exum 7 PIR: Lessort 26	Report	Pts: Jackson 19; Rebs: Ivišić 5 Asts: Tasić 6 PIR: Jackson 22	Arena: Štark Arena; Attendance: 6,947; Referees: Josip Radojković, Bojan Kruljac, Marko Mustapić

24 October 2022 4	Mornar Barsko zlato (Montenegro)	62–83	(Serbia) Partizan	Bar
21:00	Scoring by quarter: 17–24, 10–22, 22–18, 13–19
Arena Sport, B92	Pts: Mihailović, Pecarski 19; Rebs: Pecarski 11; Asts: Russell 5 PIR: Pecarski 29	Report	Pts: LeDay 18; Rebs: Koprivica 9 Asts: Madar 5 PIR: LeDay 21	Arena: Topolica Sport Hall; Attendance: 2,500; Referees: Tomislav Hordov, Milan Nedović, Luka Kardum

30 October 2022 5	Partizan (Serbia)	86–76	(Serbia) Mega MIS	Belgrade
21:00	Scoring by quarter: 25–26, 25–13, 22–19, 14–18
Arena Sport	Pts: Nunnally 14; Rebs: Lessort 8 Asts: Exum 5 PIR: Nunnally 17	Report	Pts: Rudan 26; Rebs: Rudan 9 Asts: Rorie 4 PIR: Rudan 34	Arena: Štark Arena; Attendance: 5,988; Referees: Matej Boltauzer, Mario Majkić, Edo Javor

6 November 2022 6	Borac Čačak (Serbia)	62–81	(Serbia) Partizan	Čačak
17:00	Scoring by quarter: 12–19, 22–23, 11–11, 17–28
Arena Sport	Pts: Radonjić 15; Rebs: Radonjić 7 Asts: Radonjić 3 PIR: Radonjić 21	Report	Pts: Trifunović 15; Rebs: Lessort 8 Asts: Punter 5 PIR: LeDay 18	Arena: Borac Hall; Attendance: 2,500; Referees: Uroš Nikolić, Marko Pecelj, Vladimir Vesković

20 November 2022 7	Partizan (Serbia)	89–70	(Croatia) Split	Belgrade
19:00	Scoring by quarter: 20–19, 19–19, 29–15, 21–17
Arena Sport	Pts: LeDay 14; Rebs: Smailagić 10; Asts: Papapetrou 3 PIR: LeDay 17	Report	Pts: Shorter 23; Rebs: Šarić 7 Asts: Mavra 3 PIR: Shorter, Mavra 19	Arena: Štark Arena; Attendance: 4,725; Referees: Milan Nedović, Krunoslav Peić, Aleksandar Milojević

28 November 2022 8	Crvena zvezda Meridianbet (Serbia)	90–74	(Serbia) Partizan	Belgrade
20:00	Scoring by quarter: 20–18, 29–30, 21–17, 20–9
Arena Sport	Pts: Vildoza 19; Rebs: Petrušev 5 Asts: Vildoza, Nedović 5 PIR: Nedović 23	Report	Pts: Papapetrou 15; Rebs: LeDay 8 Asts: Exum 4 PIR: Exum 17	Arena: Aleksandar Nikolić Hall; Attendance: 7,464; Referees: Damir Javor, Josip Radojković, Marko Mustapić

4 December 2022 9	Partizan (Serbia)	106–77	(Montenegro) Budućnost VOLI	Belgrade
19:00	Scoring by quarter: 25–23, 28–11, 26–18, 27–25
Arena Sport	Pts: Vukčević 15; Rebs: Lessort 9 Asts: Exum 5 PIR: Lessort 23	Report	Pts: Reynolds 16; Rebs: Kaba 6 Asts: Bell-Haynes 4 PIR: Reynolds, Kaba 10	Arena: Štark Arena; Attendance: 5,778; Referees: Matej Boltauzer, Tomislav Hordov, Tomislav Stapić

11 December 2022 10	Cedevita Olimpija (Slovenia)	77–74	(Serbia) Partizan	Ljubljana
19:00	Scoring by quarter: 23–19, 20–24, 20–18, 14–13
Arena Sport	Pts: Ferrell 18; Rebs: Omić 8 Asts: Ferrell 8 PIR: Ferrell 23	Report	Pts: Exum 24; Rebs: Lessort 5 Asts: Exum 6 PIR: Exum 28	Arena: Arena Stožice; Attendance: 4,561; Referees: Uroš Nikolić, Mario Majkić, Dragan Porobić

19 December 2022 11	Partizan (Serbia)	90–86	(Serbia) FMP Meridian	Belgrade
18:00	Scoring by quarter: 21–17, 24–18, 28–12, 17–39
Arena Sport	Pts: Lessort, Smailagić, Trifunović 14; Rebs: Smailagić, Exum 5 Asts: Exum, Madar 5 PIR: Exum 24	Report	Pts: Stepanović 17; Rebs: Manojlović 6 Asts: Valinskas 8 PIR: Stepanović 24	Arena: Štark Arena; Attendance: 3,396; Referees: Damir Javor, Milan Nedović, Denis Hadžić

25 December 2022 12	Igokea m:tel (Bosnia and Herzegovina)	85–96	(Serbia) Partizan	Laktaši
18:30	Scoring by quarter: 22–32, 25–25, 21–19, 17–20
Arena Sport	Pts: Crawford 26; Rebs: Tanasković, Đorđević 7 Asts: Ray 5 PIR: Đorđević 31	Report	Pts: Punter, Nunnally 18; Rebs: LeDay 6 Asts: Nunnally, Exum 4 PIR: Lessort 22	Arena: Laktaši Sports Hall; Attendance: 3,300; Referees: Josip Radojković, Radoš Savović, Bojan Kruljac

2 January 2023 13	Partizan (Serbia)	114–77	(Croatia) Zadar	Belgrade
18:30	Scoring by quarter: 34–25, 29–24, 27–15, 24–13
Arena Sport	Pts: Vukčević 25; Rebs: Vukčević 9 Asts: Papapetrou 6 PIR: Vukčević 32	Report	Pts: Božić 19; Rebs: Božić 10; Asts: Božić 6 PIR: Božić 21	Arena: Štark Arena; Attendance: 6,573; Referees: Miloš Koljenšić, Dragan Porobić, Tomislav Stapić

8 January 2023 14	Partizan (Serbia)	93–68	(Croatia) Cibona	Belgrade
19:00	Scoring by quarter: 17–19, 32–19, 25–19, 19–11
Arena Sport	Pts: Anđušić 22; Rebs: Vukčević 10; Asts: Avramović 8 PIR: Anđušić 22	Report	Pts: Aranitović 16; Rebs: Baković 9 Asts: Aranitović, Radovčić 4 PIR: Baković 21	Arena: Štark Arena; Attendance: 7,133; Referees: Saša Pukl, Radoš Savović, Nermin Nikšić

16 January 2023 15	Partizan (Serbia)	120–67	(North Macedonia) MZT Skopje Aerodrom	Belgrade
18:00	Scoring by quarter: 29–15, 25–19, 30–17, 36–16
Arena Sport	Pts: Smailagić 24; Rebs: Smailagić, Vukčević 7 Asts: Avramović 9 PIR: Smailagić 31	Report	Pts: Stojanovski 16; Rebs: Abu 5 Asts: Caffey 6 PIR: Caffey 17	Arena: Štark Arena; Attendance: 5,114; Referees: Tomislav Hordov, Bojan Kruljac, Edo Javor

22 January 2023 16	SC Derby (Montenegro)	81–100	(Serbia) Partizan	Podgorica
19:30	Scoring by quarter: 23–22, 17–29, 22–22, 19–27
Arena Sport	Pts: Tasić 17; Rebs: Tasić, Magee 4 Asts: Jackson 4 PIR: Tasić 23	Report	Pts: Anđušić 17; Rebs: Lessort 10; Asts: Exum 5 PIR: Lessort 27	Arena: Morača Sports Center; Attendance: 2,500; Referees: Milan Nedović, Marko Juras, Radoš Savović

29 January 2023 17	Partizan (Serbia)	92–74	(Montenegro) Mornar Barsko zlato	Belgrade
19:00	Scoring by quarter: 28–26, 13–15, 30–21, 21–12
Arena Sport	Pts: Papapetrou 19; Rebs: Smailagić 7 Asts: Avramović 8 PIR: Avramović 30	Report	Pts: Glas 20; Rebs: Jones, Pecarski 8 Asts: Đoković 5 PIR: Jones, Glas 19	Arena: Aleksandar Nikolić Hall; Attendance: 5,033; Referees: Sašo Petek, Luka Kardum, Marko Mustapić

5 February 2023 18	Mega MIS (Serbia)	78–103	(Serbia) Partizan	Belgrade
18:30	Scoring by quarter: 17–28, 20–37, 20–20, 21–18
Arena Sport	Pts: Đurišić 17; Rebs: Branković 7 Asts: Cerovina 7 PIR: Đurišić, Cerovina 18	Report	Pts: Madar 15; Rebs: Smailagić 6 Asts: Avramović 6 PIR: Madar 22	Arena: Ranko Žeravica Sports Hall; Attendance: 1,700; Referees: Tomislav Hordov, Miloš Koljenšić, Mario Majkić

12 February 2023 19	Partizan (Serbia)	114–84	(Serbia) Borac Čačak	Belgrade
19:00	Scoring by quarter: 30-21, 18-18, 34-27, 32-18
Arena Sport	Pts: Lessort 19; Rebs: Smailagić 5 Asts: Punter 7 PIR: Lessort 24	Report	Pts: Hale 24; Rebs: Gagić 8 Asts: Gagić, Hale 6 PIR: Gagić 33	Arena: Aleksandar Nikolić Hall; Attendance: 3,447; Referees: Milivoje Jovčić, Marko Pecelj, Vladimir Vesković

4 March 2023 20	Split (Croatia)	95–96	(Serbia) Partizan	Split
18:00	Scoring by quarter: 24–27, 23-21, 24-23, 24–25
Arena Sport	Pts: Shorter 25; Rebs: Sullivan 13; Asts: Mavra 13; PIR: Mavra 34	Report	Pts: Nunnally 18; Rebs: Smailagić 7 Asts: Punter 10; PIR: Exum 22	Arena: Arena Gripe; Attendance: 2,500; Referees: Damir Javor, Miloš Koljenšić, Edo Javor

13 March 2023 21	Partizan (Serbia)	92–81	(Serbia) Crvena zvezda Meridianbet	Belgrade
20:30	Scoring by quarter: 13–24, 21–24, 29-18, 29-15
Arena Sport	Pts: Lessort 27; Rebs: Lessort 8 Asts: Madar 5 PIR: Lessort 38	Report	Pts: Campazzo 21; Rebs: Martin 6 Asts: Campazzo 5 PIR: Campazzo 27	Arena: Štark Arena; Attendance: 17,124; Referees: Tomislav Hordov, Milan Nedović, Luka Kardum

21 April 2023* 22	Budućnost VOLI (Montenegro)	82–83	(Serbia) Partizan	Podgorica
19:00	Scoring by quarter: 15–19, 16–22, 25-18, 26-24
Arena Sport	Pts: Green 31; Rebs: Kaba 8 Asts: Bell-Haynes 3 PIR: Green 34	Report	Pts: Punter 14; Rebs: LeDay 9 Asts: Punter 4 PIR: Lessort 19	Arena: Morača Sports Center; Attendance: 4,900; Referees: Matej Boltauzer, Sašo Petek, Mario Majkić

26 March 2023 23	Partizan (Serbia)	76–73	(Slovenia) Cedevita Olimpija	Belgrade
19:00	Scoring by quarter: 17–23, 27-23, 20-20, 12-7
Arena Sport	Pts: Papapetrou 14; Rebs: Papapetrou 8 Asts: Punter, Exum 3 PIR: LeDay 23	Report	Pts: Adams 19; Rebs: Murić 8 Asts: Ferrell, Dragić 4 PIR: Adams 22	Arena: Štark Arena; Attendance: 15,685; Referees: Josip Radojković, Mario Majkić, Denis Hadžić

3 April 2023 24	FMP Meridian (Serbia)	91–97	(Serbia) Partizan	Belgrade
20:00	Scoring by quarter: 18-24, 25-25, 23-25, 25-23
Arena Sport	Pts: Stepanović 21; Rebs: Stepanović 6 Asts: Moore 8 PIR: Stepanović 20	Report	Pts: LeDay 19; Rebs: Exum 8 Asts: Punter 3 PIR: LeDay 24	Arena: Železnik Hall; Attendance: 437; Referees: Damir Javor, Sašo Petek, Dragan Porobić

10 April 2023 25	Partizan (Serbia)	89–74	(Bosnia and Herzegovina) Igokea m:tel	Belgrade
20:00	Scoring by quarter: 33-25, 17-19, 18-13, 21-17
Arena Sport	Pts: Avramović 15; Rebs: Exum 7 Asts: Papapetrou 5 PIR: Avramović 16	Report	Pts: Nerandžić, Đorđević 18; Rebs: Đorđević 10; Asts: Stanković 6 PIR: Nerandžić 23	Arena: Štark Arena; Attendance: 11,187; Referees: Matej Boltauzer, Tomislav Vovk, Krešimir Katić

17 April 2023 26	Zadar (Croatia)	78–88	(Serbia) Partizan	Zadar
18:00	Scoring by quarter: 15-24, 15-25, 25-15, 23-24
Arena Sport	Pts: Davis 22; Rebs: Božić 13; Asts: Božić 9 PIR: Davis 27	Report	Pts: Nunnally 18; Rebs: Lessort, Papapetrou 5 Asts: Lessort, LeDay 3 PIR: Lessort 19	Arena: Krešimir Ćosić Hall; Attendance: 5,000; Referees: Saša Pukl, Damir Javor, Luka Kardum

=== ABA League Playoffs ===
==== Quarterfinals ====
15 May 2023 G1	Partizan (Serbia)	83–84	(Montenegro) SC Derby	Belgrade
19:00	Scoring by quarter: 17–22, 29–25, 21–21, 16–16
Arena Sport	Pts: Leday 20; Rebs: Leday, Papapetrou, Lessort 5 Asts: Punter 5 PIR: Lessort 23	Report	Pts: Ivišić 22; Rebs: Ivišić 13; Asts: Drežnjak 5 PIR: Ivišić 32	Arena: Aleksandar Nikolić Hall; Attendance: 4,715; Referees: Milan Nedović, Miloš Koljenšić, Stefan Ćalić

18 May 2023 G2	SC Derby (Montenegro)	79–81	(Serbia) Partizan	Podgorica
19:00	Scoring by quarter: 21–19, 19–21, 23–20, 16–21
Arena Sport	Pts: Magee 15; Rebs: Ivišić 8 Asts: Drežnjak 6 PIR: Pavličević 15	Report	Pts: Exum 24; Rebs: Lessort 8 Asts: Exum 4 PIR: Exum 25	Arena: Morača Sports Center; Attendance: 2,560; Referees: Josip Radojković, Mario Majkić, Dragan Porobić

22 May 2023 G3	Partizan (Serbia)	112–83	(Montenegro) SC Derby	Belgrade
20:00	Scoring by quarter: 27–21, 30–17, 23–25, 32–20
Arena Sport	Pts: Nunnally 17; Rebs: Punter 4 Asts: Exum 6 PIR: Nunnally 20	Report	Pts: Tasić 14; Rebs: Hadžibegović 5 Asts: Pavličević 7 PIR: Tasić 20	Arena: Štark Arena; Attendance: 14,077; Referees: Damir Javor, Sašo Petek, Luka Kardum

==== Semifinals ====
28 May 2023 G1	Partizan (Serbia)	85–70	(Slovenia) Cedevita Olimpija	Belgrade
19:30	Scoring by quarter: 18–8, 24–18, 18–16, 25–28
Arena Sport	Pts: Nunnally 18; Rebs: Koprivica 5 Asts: Leday 5 PIR: Exum 17	Report	Pts: Ferrell 13; Rebs: Omić 17; Asts: Ferrell 5 PIR: Omić 27	Arena: Štark Arena; Attendance: 15,527; Referees: Tomislav Hordov, Josip Radojković, Marko Mustapić

30 May 2023 G2	Cedevita Olimpija (Slovenia)	95–83	(Serbia) Partizan	Ljubljana
18:00	Scoring by quarter: 29–26, 22–15, 22–19, 22–23
Arena Sport	Pts: Ferrell 21; Rebs: Ferrell 8 Asts: Ferrell 7 PIR: Ferrell 36	Report	Pts: Punter 24; Rebs: Punter 8 Asts: Punter, Exum 3 PIR: Punter 23	Arena: Arena Stožice; Attendance: 9,233; Referees: Miloš Koljenšić, Luka Kardum, Denis Hadžić

6 June 2023 G1	Partizan (Serbia)	90–71	(Slovenia) Cedevita Olimpija	Belgrade
19:00	Scoring by quarter: 22–16, 17–14, 24–23, 25–18
Arena Sport	Pts: Leday 17; Rebs: Lessort 5 Asts: Nunnally 5 PIR: Leday 19	Report	Pts: Dragić 15; Rebs: Omić 8 Asts: Ferrell 7 PIR: Dragić 16	Arena: Štark Arena; Attendance: 14,877; Referees: Tomislav Hordov, Miloš Koljenšić, Denis Hadžić

==== Final ====
13 June 2023 G1	Partizan (Serbia)	88–80	(Serbia) Crvena zvezda Meridianbet	Belgrade
20:00	Scoring by quarter: 29–21, 27–15, 17–25, 15–19
Arena Sport	Pts: LeDay 24; Rebs: LeDay, Lessort 5 Asts: Madar 5 PIR: Punter 26	Report	Pts: Dobrić 17; Rebs: Dobrić 6 Asts: Campazzo 10; PIR: Campazzo 20	Arena: Štark Arena; Attendance: 18,324; Referees: Saša Pukl, Josip Radojković, Milan Nedović

15 June 2023 G2	Partizan (Serbia)	87–78	(Serbia) Crvena zvezda Meridianbet	Belgrade
20:00	Scoring by quarter: 23–22, 21–22, 24–18, 19–16
Arena Sport	Pts: Smailagić, Nunnally 15; Rebs: LeDay 6 Asts: Madar 7 PIR: LeDay 18	Report	Pts: Nedović 21; Rebs: Bentil 7 Asts: Campazzo 7 PIR: Nedović 15	Arena: Štark Arena; Attendance: 18,477; Referees: Matej Boltauzer, Miloš Koljenšić, Sašo Petek

18 June 2023 G3	Crvena zvezda Meridianbet (Serbia)	91–78	(Serbia) Partizan	Belgrade
20:30	Scoring by quarter: 19–21, 19–20, 24–18, 29–19
Arena Sport	Pts: Nedović 19; Rebs: Mitrović 7 Asts: Campazzo 7 PIR: Petrušev 23	Report	Pts: Exum 16; Rebs: Lessort 9 Asts: Exum 3 PIR: Exum 13	Arena: Aleksandar Nikolić Hall; Attendance: 7,648; Referees: Damir Javor, Tomislav Hordov, Luka Kardum

20 June 2023 G4	Crvena zvezda Meridianbet (Serbia)	68–56	(Serbia) Partizan	Belgrade
19:00	Scoring by quarter: 20–13, 12–11, 17–15, 19–17
Arena Sport	Pts: Campazzo 21; Rebs: Dobrić 7 Asts: Campazzo 4 PIR: Campazzo, Dobrić 18	Report	Pts: Exum 12; Rebs: Exum 10; Asts: Lessort 3 PIR: Lessort 20	Arena: Aleksandar Nikolić Hall; Attendance: 7,430; Referees: Saša Pukl, Matej Boltauzer, Josip Radojković

22 June 2023 G5	Partizan (Serbia)	96–85	(Serbia) Crvena zvezda Meridianbet	Belgrade
20:00	Scoring by quarter: 30-18, 24-16, 21–34, 21-17
Arena Sport	Pts: Punter 32; Rebs: Lessort 8 Asts: Exum 5 PIR: Punter 36	Report	Pts: Dobrić 18; Rebs: Dobrić, Petrušev 5 Asts: Campazzo 8 PIR: Dobrić 22	Arena: Štark Arena; Attendance: 22,198; Referees: Saša Pukl, Damir Javor, Tomislav Hordov

== EuroLeague ==
=== Regular season ===
Pos	Team	Pld	W	L	PF	PA	PD	Qualification
4	(French Federation of Basketball) AS Monaco	34	21	13	2802	2749	+53	Qualification to playoffs
5	(Israeli Basketball Association) Maccabi Playtika Tel Aviv	34	20	14	2827	2743	+84	Qualification to playoffs
6	(Basketball Federation of Serbia) Partizan Mozzart Bet	34	20	14	2877	2781	+96	Qualification to playoffs
7	(Lithuanian Basketball Federation) Žalgiris	34	19	15	2591	2626	−35	Qualification to playoffs
8	(Turkish Basketball Federation) Fenerbahçe Beko	34	19	15	2823	2745	+78	Qualification to playoffs

Source: EuroLeague
Rules for classification: All points scored in extra period(s) were not counted in the standings, nor for any tie-break situation.

=== Matches ===
Win Loss

7 October 2022 1	Alba Berlin (Germany)	100–84	(Serbia) Partizan	Berlin
20:00	Scoring by quarter: 33–18, 28–25, 16–18, 23–23
Sport Klub	Pts: Blatt 16; Rebs: Olinde 10; Asts: Sikma 7 PIR: Sikma 27	Report	Pts: Exum 22; Rebs: Punter, Lessort 6 Asts: Exum 4 PIR: Exum 22	Arena: Mercedes-Benz Arena; Attendance: 10,984; Referees: Oļegs Latiševs, Rain Peerandi, Guido Giovannetti

14 October 2022 2	Cazoo Baskonia (Spain)	103–96(OT)	(Serbia) Partizan	Vitoria-Gasteiz
20:30	Scoring by quarter: 14–23, 32–19, 21–26, 22–21, Overtime: 14–7
Sport Klub	Pts: Howard 33; Rebs: Giedraitis 9 Asts: Thompson 7 PIR: Howard 27	Report	Pts: Punter 26; Rebs: Lessort 12; Asts: Exum 4 PIR: Lessort 34	Arena: Fernando Buesa Arena; Attendance: 6,912; Referees: Robert Lottermoser, Sergio Silva, Vassilis Pitsilkas

18 October 2022 3	Partizan (Serbia)	75–80	(Italy) EA7 Emporio Armani Milan	Belgrade
20:45	Scoring by quarter: 27–17, 22–24, 12–21, 14–18
Sport Klub	Pts: LeDay 23; Rebs: Lessort 10; Asts: Madar 4 PIR: LeDay 25	Report	Pts: Shields 25; Rebs: Voigtmann 6 Asts: Voigtmann, Hall 4 PIR: Shields 26	Arena: Štark Arena; Attendance: 16,563; Referees: Daniel Hierrezuelo, Emin Moğulkoç, Ioannis Foufis

20 October 2022 4	Partizan (Serbia)	90–62	(Italy) Virtus Segafredo Bologna	Belgrade
20:30	Scoring by quarter: 27–11, 24–21, 18–15, 21–15
Sport Klub	Pts: Nunnally 20; Rebs: LeDay 9 Asts: Nunnally 4 PIR: Nunnally 24	Report	Pts: Bako 11; Rebs: Bako, Weems 4 Asts: Teodosić 4 PIR: Bako 16	Arena: Štark Arena; Attendance: Juan Carlos García González, Piotr Pastusiak, Maxime Boubert; Referees: 15,309

27 October 2022 5	Partizan (Serbia)	87–76	(Lithuania) Žalgiris	Belgrade
20:30	Scoring by quarter: 20–22, 24–14, 16–21, 27–19
Sport Klub	Pts: Punter 26; Rebs: Lessort 8 Asts: LeDay 4 PIR: Punter 20	Report	Pts: Evans 16; Rebs: Hayes 7 Asts: Evans 9 PIR: Evans 19	Arena: Štark Arena; Attendance: 16,097; Referees: Oļegs Latiševs, Benjamin Jimenez, Hugues Thepenier

3 November 2022 6	Panathinaikos (Greece)	89–91	(Serbia) Partizan	Athens
20:30	Scoring by quarter: 16–31, 25–23, 23–14, 25–23
Sport Klub	Pts: Wolters, Bacon 17; Rebs: Williams 7 Asts: Wolters 4 PIR: Wolters 20	Report	Pts: Punter 29; Rebs: Lessort 11; Asts: Punter 4 PIR: Lessort 28	Arena: OAKA Altion; Attendance: 8,309; Referees: Miguel Angel Pérez, Fernando Rocha, Saulius Racys

10 November 2022 7	Olympiacos (Greece)	87–58	(Serbia) Partizan	Piraeus
20:00	Scoring by quarter: 22–14, 23–24, 23–16, 19–4
Sport Klub	Pts: Sloukas 17; Rebs: Vezenkov 7 Asts: Sloukas 8 PIR: Sloukas, Vezenkov 25	Report	Pts: Punter, Nunnally 14; Rebs: Nunnally, Lessort 6 Asts: Nunnally 3 PIR: Lessort 19	Arena: Peace and Friendship Stadium; Attendance: 9,367; Referees: Sreten Radović, Jordi Aliaga Solé, Rain Peerandi

18 November 2022 8	Partizan (Serbia)	96–88	(Israel) Maccabi Playtika Tel Aviv	Belgrade
20:30	Scoring by quarter: 22–26, 27–24, 20–18, 27–20
Sport Klub	Pts: LeDay, Exum 21; Rebs: Lessort 8 Asts: Exum 5 PIR: Exum 31	Report	Pts: Baldwin IV 23; Rebs: Baldwin IV, Sorkin, Colson 4 Asts: Baldwin IV 7 PIR: Baldwin IV 26	Arena: Štark Arena; Attendance: 19,011; Referees: Daniel Hierrezuelo, Emin Moğulkoç, Joseph Bissang

22 November 2022 9	Barcelona (Spain)	79–68	(Serbia) Partizan	Barcelona
20:45	Scoring by quarter: 17–21, 22–11, 25–17, 15–19
Sport Klub	Pts: Laprovíttola 13; Rebs: da Silva 10; Asts: Laprovíttola 6 PIR: Laprovíttola 14	Report	Pts: Anđušić 21; Rebs: Lessort, Brodziansky 5 Asts: Anđušić, Trifunović, Madar 2 PIR: Anđušić 28	Arena: Palau Blaugrana; Attendance: 5,066; Referees: Oļegs Latiševs, Sergio Silva, Mehdi Difallah

24 November 2022 10	Real Madrid (Spain)	105–97	(Serbia) Partizan	Madrid
20:45	Scoring by quarter: 32–40, 22–11, 32–23, 19–23
Sport Klub	Pts: Llull 20; Rebs: Tavares 8 Asts: Deck, Musa 4 PIR: Tavares, Deck 21	Report	Pts: LeDay 20; Rebs: LeDay 6 Asts: LeDay 6 PIR: LeDay 28	Arena: WiZink Center; Attendance: 6,687; Referees: Fernando Rocha, Carmelo Paternicò, Amit Balak

1 December 2022 11	Partizan (Serbia)	96–100(OT)	(Spain) Valencia Basket	Belgrade
20:45	Scoring by quarter: 21–21, 22–16, 21–23, 20–24, Overtime: 12–16
Sport Klub	Pts: Lessort 22; Rebs: Lessort 10; Asts: Exum 6 PIR: Lessort 37	Report	Pts: Rivero 22; Rebs: Webb III 9 Asts: Harper, Claver, Jones 5 PIR: López-Arostegui 23	Arena: Štark Arena; Attendance: 14,136; Referees: Borys Ryzhyk, Seffi Shemmesh, Thomas Bissuel

8 December 2022 12	Partizan (Serbia)	73–76	(Serbia) Crvena zvezda mts	Belgrade
20:30	Scoring by quarter: 20–11, 13–29, 19–14, 21–22
Sport Klub	Pts: Punter 15; Rebs: Lessort 10; Asts: Lessort, Madar, Vukčević 3 PIR: Lessort 24	Report	Pts: Nedović 20; Rebs: Martin 7 Asts: Vildoza 6 PIR: Vildoza 21	Arena: Štark Arena; Attendance: 18,340; Referees: Juan Carlos García, Robert Lottermoser, Gytis Vilius

13 December 2022 13	LDLC ASVEL (France)	91–87	(Serbia) Partizan	Villeurbanne
20:00	Scoring by quarter: 25–25, 22–23, 26–18, 18–21
Sport Klub	Pts: de Colo 32; Rebs: Noua 5 Asts: de Colo, Lighty 3 PIR: de Colo 30	Report	Pts: Exum 26; Rebs: Lessort 8 Asts: Exum 6 PIR: Exum 35	Arena: Astroballe; Attendance: 4,744; Referees: Daniel Hierrezuelo, Anne Panther, Jakub Zamojski

16 December 2022 14	Partizan (Serbia)	82–79	(Turkey) Anadolu Efes	Belgrade
20:30	Scoring by quarter: 14–10, 14–27, 25–17, 29–25
Sport Klub	Pts: Exum, Punter, Nunnally 18; Rebs: Lessort 5 Asts: Nunnally 7 PIR: Punter 26	Report	Pts: Beaubois 30; Rebs: Žižić 9 Asts: Micić 6 PIR: Žižić 33	Arena: Štark Arena; Attendance: 13,779; Referees: Miguel Angel Pérez, Elias Koromilas, Adar Peer

22 December 2022 15	Fenerbahçe Beko (Turkey)	72–73	(Serbia) Partizan	Istanbul
18:45	Scoring by quarter: 19–16, 18–17, 20–18, 15–22
Sport Klub	Pts: Wilbekin 14; Rebs: Calathes, Hayes 7 Asts: Calathes 7 PIR: Hayes 22	Report	Pts: Lessort, Punter 12; Rebs: LeDay, Papapetrou 6 Asts: LeDay, Punter, Exum, Anđušić, Madar 2 PIR: Punter 17	Arena: Ülker Sports and Event Hall; Attendance: 9,735; Referees: Sreten Radović, Carmelo Paternicò, Emilio Pérez

29 December 2022 16	Partizan (Serbia)	83–77	(Germany) Bayern Munich	Belgrade
20:30	Scoring by quarter: 19–14, 22–15, 18–20, 24–28
Sport Klub	Pts: Exum 19; Rebs: Lessort 11; Asts: Exum, Madar 3 PIR: Lessort 28	Report	Pts: Hunter 16; Rebs: Hunter 14; Asts: Weiler-Babb 4 PIR: Rubit 24	Arena: Štark Arena; Attendance: 17,574; Referees: Oļegs Latiševs, Carlos Cortes, Amit Balak

5 January 2023 17	Partizan (Serbia)	100–80	(France) AS Monaco	Belgrade
20:30	Scoring by quarter: 26–17, 22–30, 21–21, 31–12
Sport Klub	Pts: Lessort 21; Rebs: Lessort 8 Asts: Punter 4 PIR: Lessort 27	Report	Pts: Okobo 17; Rebs: Motiejūnas, Hall 7 Asts: Okobo 9 PIR: Okobo 22	Arena: Štark Arena; Attendance: 17,883; Referees: Daniel Hierrezuelo, Artūras Šukys, Leandro Lezcano

11 January 2023 18	Maccabi Playtika Tel Aviv (Israel)	90–81	(Serbia) Partizan	Tel Aviv
20:05	Scoring by quarter: 24–13, 22–26, 18–14, 26–28
Sport Klub	Pts: Brown 21; Rebs: Colson 7 Asts: Brown 5 PIR: Colson, Martin 21	Report	Pts: Punter 22; Rebs: LeDay 9 Asts: Punter, Avramović 3 PIR: Punter 24	Arena: Menora Mivtachim Arena; Attendance: 10,382; Referees: Anne Panther, Mario Majkić, Piotr Pastusiak

13 January 2023 19	Partizan (Serbia)	83–65	(Spain) Cazoo Baskonia	Belgrade
20:30	Scoring by quarter: 29–17, 18–19, 20–14, 16–15
Sport Klub	Pts: Trifunović 15; Rebs: LeDay, Lessort 5 Asts: Papapetrou 6 PIR: Lessort 20	Report	Pts: Marinković 16; Rebs: Sedekerskis 9 Asts: Hommes 5 PIR: Sedekerskis 17	Arena: Štark Arena; Attendance: 18,441; Referees: Emin Moğulkoç, Carmelo Paternicò, Vassilis Pitsilkas

19 January 2023 20	Valencia Basket (Spain)	89–81	(Serbia) Partizan	Valencia
20:45	Scoring by quarter: 27–18, 20–19, 22–21, 20–23
Sport Klub	Pts: Dubljević 20; Rebs: Dubljević 6 Asts: Prepelič 5 PIR: Dubljević 25	Report	Pts: Exum 22; Rebs: Trifunović 6 Asts: Punter 4 PIR: Exum, Trifunović 17	Arena: La Fonteta; Attendance: 6,203; Referees: Sreten Radović, Joseph Bissang, Michele Rossi

27 January 2023 21	Crvena zvezda mts (Serbia)	78–79	(Serbia) Partizan	Belgrade
19:00	Scoring by quarter: 18–20, 19–25, 17–12, 24–22
Sport Klub	Pts: Vildoza 26; Rebs: Petrušev 10; Asts: Mitrović 5 PIR: Vildoza 29	Report	Pts: Exum, LeDay 20; Rebs: Lessort 8 Asts: Exum 5 PIR: Exum, LeDay 22	Arena: Aleksandar Nikolić Hall; Attendance: 8,300; Referees: Boris Ryzhyk, Fernando Rocha, Oļegs Latiševs

31 January 2023 22	Partizan (Serbia)	92–71	(France) LDLC ASVEL	Belgrade
20:30	Scoring by quarter: 25–16, 25–20, 26–15, 16–20
Sport Klub	Pts: Punter 22; Rebs: LeDay 7 Asts: Punter, Lessort, Papapetrou 2 PIR: Punter 24	Report	Pts: Fall, Pons 14; Rebs: Fall, Pons 6 Asts: Bost 5 PIR: Fall, Pons 14	Arena: Štark Arena; Attendance: 17,353; Referees: Juan Carlos García, Sergio Silva, Rain Peerandi

3 February 2023 23	Žalgris (Lithuania)	74–88	(Serbia) Partizan	Kaunas
19:00	Scoring by quarter: 15-26, 15-21, 24-14, 20-27
Sport Klub	Pts: Brazdeikis 17; Rebs: Hayes, Ulanovas 4 Asts: Ulanovas 5 PIR: Brazdeikis 19	Report	Pts: Papapetrou 17; Rebs: Leday 10; Asts: Avramović, Trifunović 4 PIR: Papapetrou 17	Arena: Žalgirio Arena; Attendance: 15,037; Referees: Daniel Hierrzuelo, Sašo Petek, Guido Giovannetti

9 February 2023 24	Bayern Munich (Germany)	71–82	(Serbia) Partizan	Munich
20:30	Scoring by quarter: 19-19, 14-20, 12-21, 26-22
Sport Klub	Pts: Seeley 11; Rebs: Gillespie 8 Asts: Rubit, Seeley 2 PIR: Gillespie 14	Report	Pts: Punter 19; Rebs: Lessort 7 Asts: Exum 5 PIR: Punter 19	Arena: Audi Dome; Attendance: 6,398; Referees: Matej Boltauzer, Mehdi Difallah, Alberto Baena

23 February 2023 25	Partizan (Serbia)	94–97	(Turkey) Fenerbahçe Beko	Belgrade
21:00	Scoring by quarter: 22-22, 24-25, 23-21, 25-29
Sport Klub	Pts: Punter 25; Rebs: Lessort 11; Asts: Madar 4 PIR: Lessort 30	Report	Pts: Gudurić 25; Rebs: Pierre 6 Asts: Gudurić 7 PIR: Gudurić 35	Arena: Štark Arena; Attendance: 19,661; Referees: Miguel Angel Perez, Borys Ryzhyk, Gytis Vilius

2 March 2023 26	Partizan (Serbia)	88–74	(Germany) Alba Berlin	Belgrade
21:00	Scoring by quarter: 20-19, 22-25, 35-9, 11-21
Sport Klub	Pts: Avramović 19; Rebs: Lessort 6 Asts: Madar 5 PIR: Lessort 18	Report	Pts: Lô 17; Rebs: Koumadje 10; Asts: Smith 6 PIR: Koumadje 22	Arena: Štark Arena; Attendance: 17,009; Referees: Juan Carlos García González, Carmelo Paternicò, Adar Peer

7 March 2023 27	Virtus Segafredo Bologna (Italy)	79–88	(Serbia) Partizan	Bologna
20:30	Scoring by quarter: 26-28, 21-17, 16-20, 16-23
Sport Klub	Pts: Jaiteh 14; Rebs: Mickey 9 Asts: Teodosić 12; PIR: Mickey 25	Report	Pts: Nunnally 18; Rebs: Leday 8 Asts: Exum 7 PIR: Exum 33	Arena: Segafredo Arena; Attendance: 8,837; Referees: Daniel Hierrezuelo, Joseph Bissang, Gentian Cici

9 March 2023 28	EA7 Emporio Armani Milan (Italy)	76–62	(Serbia) Partizan	Milan
20:30	Scoring by quarter: 13-19, 17-10, 19-17, 27-16
Sport Klub	Pts: Baron, Davies 14; Rebs: Melli 8 Asts: Pangos 7 PIR: Pangos 19	Report	Pts: Punter 15; Rebs: Lessort 6 Asts: Punter, Exum 3 PIR: Lessort 17	Arena: Mediolanum Forum; Attendance: 10,100; Referees: Oļegs Latiševs, Emilio Pérez, Hugues Thepenier

16 March 2023 29	Anadolu Efes (Turkey)	84–97	(Serbia) Partizan	Istanbul
18:30	Scoring by quarter: 23-11, 14-28, 27-24, 20-34
Sport Klub	Pts: Clyburn 22; Rebs: Clyburn 8 Asts: Larkin 6 PIR: Clyburn 25	Report	Pts: Punter 19; Rebs: Lessort 7 Asts: Exum 6 PIR: Lessort 23	Arena: Sinan Erdem Dome; Attendance: 13,366; Referees: Miguel Angel Perez, Robert Vyklicky, Ioannis Foufis

24 March 2023 30	Partizan (Serbia)	90–75	(Greece) Olympiacos	Belgrade
20:00	Scoring by quarter: 27-22, 21-12, 12-18, 30-23
Sport Klub	Pts: Nunnally 19; Rebs: Lessort 10; Asts: Nunnally 5 PIR: Lessort 26	Report	Pts: McKissic 21; Rebs: Fall 6 Asts: Walkup 9 PIR: McKissic 23	Arena: Štark Arena; Attendance: 20,003; Referees: Robert Lottermoser, Emin Moğulkoç, Gytis Vilius

28 March 2023 31	Partizan (Serbia)	80–89	(Spain) Barcelona	Belgrade
20:30	Scoring by quarter: 21-25, 24-19, 13-22, 22-23
Sport Klub	Pts: Exum 24; Rebs: Lessort 6 Asts: Punter 2 PIR: Exum 25	Report	Pts: Laprovittola 25; Rebs: Mirotić 8 Asts: Laprovittola 7 PIR: Laprovittola 32	Arena: Štark Arena; Attendance: 20,041; Referees: Borys Ryzhyk, Anne Panther, Seffi Shemmesh

31 March 2023 32	Partizan (Serbia)	104–90	(Spain) Real Madrid	Belgrade
20:30	Scoring by quarter: 21-23, 28-15, 29-34, 26-18
Sport Klub	Pts: Punter, Lessort 16; Rebs: Lessort 8 Asts: Punter 6 PIR: Lessort 29	Report	Pts: Musa 22; Rebs: Deck 7 Asts: Rodríguez 5 PIR: Rodríguez, Musa 23	Arena: Štark Arena; Attendance: 20,068; Referees: Carmelo Paternicò, Piotr Pastusiak, Saulius Racys

7 April 2023 33	AS Monaco (France)	84–88	(Serbia) Partizan	Monaco City
21:00	Scoring by quarter: 22-18, 13-24, 21-20, 28-26
Sport Klub	Pts: Okobo 23; Rebs: Brown 6 Asts: James 6 PIR: Okobo 25	Report	Pts: Avramović, Leday 22; Rebs: Lessort 9 Asts: Punter 4 PIR: Leday 24	Arena: Salle Gaston Médecin; Attendance: 4,677; Referees: Sreten Radović, Carlo Perugia, Gentian Cici

14 April 2023 34	Partizan (Serbia)	83–81	(Greece) Panathinaikos OPAP	Belgrade
20:30	Scoring by quarter: 18-26, 21-19, 19-21, 25-15
Sport Klub	Pts: Exum 18; Rebs: Lessort 9 Asts: Exum 4 PIR: Exum 27	Report	Pts: Bacon 19; Rebs: Gudaitis 8 Asts: Bacon 4 PIR: Gudaitis 19	Arena: Štark Arena; Attendance: 20,017; Referees: Robert Lottermoser, Joseph Bissang, Rain Peerandi

=== EuroLeague Playoffs ===
==== Quarterfinals ====
Win Loss

25 April 2023 G1	Real Madrid (Spain)	87–89	(Serbia) Partizan	Madrid
20:45	Scoring by quarter: 22–22, 22–26, 20–15, 23–26
Sport Klub	Pts: Deck 24; Rebs: Deck 8 Asts: Musa 3 PIR: Deck 33	Report	Pts: Punter 26; Rebs: LeDay 4 Asts: Punter 6 PIR: Punter 33	Arena: WiZink Center; Attendance: 9,813; Referees: Robert Lottermoser, Gytis Vilius, Emin Moğulkoç

27 April 2023 G2	Real Madrid (Spain)	80–95	(Serbia) Partizan	Madrid
20:45	Scoring by quarter: 21–31, 16–20, 25–24, 18–20
Sport Klub	Pts: Fernández, Hezonja 16; Rebs: Deck, Poirier 7 Asts: Rodríguez 5 PIR: Musa 16	Report	Pts: Exum 19; Rebs: Lessort 9 Asts: Punter, Avramović, Madar 3 PIR: Lessort 21	Arena: WiZink Center; Attendance: 10,267; Referees: Sreten Radović, Oļegs Latiševs, Fernando Rocha

2 May 2023 G3	Partizan (Serbia)	80–82	(Spain) Real Madrid	Belgrade
20:30	Scoring by quarter: 32–19, 16–26, 15–21, 17–16
Sport Klub	Pts: Smailagić, LeDay 15; Rebs: LeDay 8 Asts: Nunnally, Madar 3 PIR: LeDay 21	Report	Pts: Tavares 26; Rebs: Hezonja 14; Asts: Rodríguez, Musa 4 PIR: Tavares 41	Arena: Štark Arena; Attendance: 20,091; Referees: Boris Ryzhyk, Mehdi Difallah, Emin Moğulkoç

4 May 2023 G4	Partizan (Serbia)	78–85	(Spain) Real Madrid	Belgrade
20:30	Scoring by quarter: 15–27, 27–18, 13–16, 23–24
Sport Klub	Pts: LeDay 25; Rebs: Lessort 7 Asts: Exum, Anđušić 3 PIR: LeDay 25	Report	Pts: Tavares, Hanga 15; Rebs: Musa 8 Asts: Rodríguez 7 PIR: Tavares 30	Arena: Štark Arena; Attendance: 19,440; Referees: Robert Lottermoser, Gytis Vilius, Carmelo Paternicò

10 May 2023 G5	Real Madrid (Spain)	98–94	(Serbia) Partizan	Madrid
21:00	Scoring by quarter: 22–23, 17–32, 30–21, 29–18
Sport Klub	Pts: Musa 20; Rebs: Tavares 7 Asts: Rodríguez 6 PIR: Rodríguez 26	Report	Pts: Punter 28; Rebs: Madar 4 Asts: Nunnally 5 PIR: Punter 26	Arena: WiZink Center; Attendance: 12,867; Referees: Boris Ryzhyk, Oļegs Latiševs, Mehdi Difallah

== Radivoj Korać Cup ==
=== Depth chart ===
Pos.	Starting 5	Bench 1	Bench 2
C	Mathias Lessort	Alen Smailagić	Viktor Mikić
PF	Zach LeDay	Tristan Vukčević
SF	James Nunnally	Uroš Trifunović
SG	Kevin Punter	Danilo Anđušić
PG	Danté Exum	Aleksa Avramović	Savo Drezgić

(colors: Domestic players; foreign players; young players)

=== Matches ===
Win Loss

15 February 2023 Quarterfinals	Partizan	91–69	Spartak Office Shoes	Niš
18:00	Scoring by quarter: 23-16, 30-18, 20-19, 18-16
Arena Sport	Pts: Lessort 17; Rebs: LeDay 11; Asts: Avramović 6 PIR: LeDay 27	Report	Pts: Bojić 17; Rebs: Bojić 8 Asts: Hardy 5 PIR: Bojić 19	Arena: Čair Sports Center; Attendance: 2,600; Referees: Marko Juras, Jelena Smiljanić, Mladen Vuletin

17 February 2023 Semifinals	Partizan	75–83	Crvena zvezda Meridianbet	Niš
21:00	Scoring by quarter: 21-15, 23-19, 14-25, 17-24
Arena Sport	Pts: Nunnally 19; Rebs: Lessort 12; Asts: Avramović 4 PIR: Lessort 21	Report	Pts: Vildoza 15; Rebs: Mitrović, Bentil 7 Asts: Campazzo 7 PIR: Nedović 19	Arena: Čair Sports Center; Attendance: 5,200; Referees: Uroš Nikolić, Uroš Obrknežević, Stefan Ćalić

== Individual awards ==
Adriatic League

MVP of the Round

- (France) Mathias Lessort – Round 21
- (United States) Zach LeDay – Semifinal Game 3
- (United States) Kevin Punter – Final Game 1
- (United States) Zach LeDay – Final Game 2
- (United States) Kevin Punter – Final Game 5

Best Defensive Player

- (France) Mathias Lessort

Ideal Starting Five

- (France) Mathias Lessort
- (United States) Kevin Punter
- (Australia) Dante Exum

Playoffs MVP Title

- (United States) Kevin Punter

Coach of the Season

- (Serbia) Željko Obradović

Euroleague

MVP of the Round

- (Australia) Dante Exum – Round 27
- (United States) Kevin Punter – Quarterfinal Game 1

Ideal Starting Five

- (France) Mathias Lessort

EuroLeague Second Team

- (United States) Kevin Punter

EuroLeague Rising Star

- (Israel) Yam Madar
