= 2022–23 Radivoj Korać Cup =

21st Radivoj Korać Cup edition

2023 Triglav osiguranje^{1} Radivoj Korać Cup
Tournament details
- Country: Serbia
- City: Niš
- Venue: Čair Sports Center
- Dates: 15–18 February 2023
- Teams: 8
- Defending champions: Crvena zvezda Meridianbet
- TV partner: Arena Sport

Final positions
- Champions: Crvena zvezda Meridianbet
- Runners-up: Mega MIS
- Semifinalists: Partizan Mozzart Bet; FMP SoccerBet

Tournament statistics
- Matches played: 7

Awards
- MVP: (Serbia) Ognjen Dobrić
- All statistics correct as of January 2022 (UTC).^{1} Sponsored cup name, referring to Triglav Osiguranje

The 2023 Triglav osiguranje Radivoj Korać Cup was the 21st season of the Serbian men's national basketball cup tournament. The tournament was held in Niš from 15–18 February 2023. Crvena Zvezda Meridianbet once again successfully defended their title beating Mega MIS 96-79 in the final.

== Qualified teams ==
| ABA League First Division | Basketball League of Serbia | 2nd-tier Cup of Serbia |
|---|---|---|
| Borac Mozzart; Crvena zvezda Meridianbet; FMP SoccerBet; Mega MIS; Partizan Mozzart Bet | Metalac (1st) ^{L} | Vojvodina; Spartak Office Shoes |

^{L} The league table position after 15 rounds played

=== Personnel and sponsorship ===
| Team | Head coach | Captain | Kit manufacturer | Shirt sponsor |
|---|---|---|---|---|
| Borac Mozzart | (Serbia) Dejan Mijatović | (Serbia) Nemanja Todorović | — | P.S. Fashion / MozzartSport |
| Crvena zvezda Meridianbet | (Montenegro) Duško Ivanović | (Serbia) Branko Lazić | Adidas | Meridian / mts |
| FMP SoccerBet | (Serbia) Nenad Stefanović | (Serbia) Charles Jenkins | Adidas | SoccerBet |
| Mega MIS | (Serbia) Marko Barać | (Serbia) Luka Cerovina | Adidas | Medical Innovation Solutions |
| Metalac | (Serbia) Branislav Ratkovica | (Serbia) Marko Bajić | Peak | — |
| Partizan Mozzart Bet | (Serbia) Željko Obradović | (Serbia) Kevin Punter | Under Armour | NIS / Mozzart |
| Spartak Office Shoes | (Serbia) Željko Lukajić | (Serbia) Predrag Prlja | — | Office Shoes |
| Vojvodina | (Serbia) Miloš Isakov Kovačević | (Serbia) Marko Ljubičić | Ardu Sport | — |

== Venue ==
On 23 December 2022, it was announced that the tournament will be held in Niš.

| Niš | 2022–23 Radivoj Korać Cup (Serbia) |
| Čair Sports Center | 2022–23 Radivoj Korać Cup (Serbia) |
| Capacity: 5,000 | 2022–23 Radivoj Korać Cup (Serbia) |

== Draw ==
The draw was held in the Crowne Plaza hotel in Belgrade on 24 January 2023 and conducted at the Arena Sport live show. It was held by participating coaches Željko Lukajić (Spartak) and Miloš Isakov Kovačević (Vojvodina), the Deputy-Mayor of Niš Dušica Davidović, and the Triglav Serbia marketing director Ivana Vulić Živković.

| Seeded teams Partizan Mozzart Bet Crvena zvezda Meridianbet FMP SoccerBet Mega MIS | Non-seeded teams Borac Mozzart^{1} Metalac Spartak Office Shoes Vojvodina |

^{1} The lowest ABA League position after 13 rounds played

== Bracket ==
Quarterfinals
15 February
Partizan Mozzart Bet | 91
Spartak Office Shoes | 69
16 February
Crvena zvezda Meridianbet | 89
Borac Mozzart | 64
16 February
FMP SoccerBet | 91
Metalac | 76
15 February
Mega MIS | 75
Vojvodina | 62

Semifinals
17 February
Partizan Mozzart Bet | 75
Crvena zvezda Meridianbet | 83
17 February
FMP SoccerBet | 67
Mega MIS | 86

Final
18 February
Crvena zvezda Meridianbet | 96
Mega MIS | 79

== Quarterfinals ==
All times are local UTC+1.

=== Partizan Mozzart Bet v Spartak Office Shoes ===
15 February 2023
18:00

Report

| Partizan Mozzart Bet | 91–69 | Spartak Office Shoes |
Scoring by quarter: 23-16, 30-18, 20-19, 18-16
| Pts: Mathias Lessort 17; Rebs: Zach LeDay 11; Asts: Aleksa Avramović 6 | | Pts: Andrija Bojić 17; Rebs: Andrija Bojić 8 Asts: P.J. Hardy 5 |

Čair Sports Center, Niš
Attendance: 2,600
Referees: Marko Juras, Jelena Smiljanić, Mladen Vuletin

=== Mega MIS v Vojvodina ===
15 February 2023
21:00

Report

| Mega MIS | 75–62 | Vojvodina |
Scoring by quarter: 19-18, 25-20, 19-14, 12-10
| Pts: Ahmaad Rorie 13; Rebs: Danko Branković 7 Asts: Luka Cerovina 4 | | Pts: Dušan Beslać 23; Rebs: Stefan Šajin 8 Asts: Koča Jovović 6 |

Čair Sports Center, Niš
Attendance: 650
Referees: Radoš Arsenijević, Ivan Stefanović, Milan Sibinović

=== Crvena zvezda Meridianbet v Borac Mozzart ===
16 February 2023
18:00

Report

| Crvena zvezda Meridianbet | 89–64 | Borac Mozzart |
Scoring by quarter: 17-19, 18-12, 29-17, 25-16
| Pts: Luca Vildoza 18; Rebs: Luka Mitrović 7 Asts: Facundo Campazzo 6 | | Pts: Đorđe Gagić, Marko Radonjić 14; Rebs: Đorđe Gagić 9 Asts: Đorđe Gagić 5 |

Čair Sports Center, Niš
Attendance: 2,600
Referees: Nemanja Ninković, Vladimir Vesković, Miloš Hadžić

=== FMP SoccerBet v Metalac ===
16 February 2023
21:00

Report

| FMP SoccerBet | 91–76 | Metalac |
Scoring by quarter: 26-12, 23-22, 18-24, 24-18
| Pts: Paulius Valinskas 20; Rebs: Nikola Janković 9 Asts: Paulius Valinskas 5 | | Pts: Duffy Jorden Randell 19; Rebs: Stefan Simanić, Durmo Ibrahim 8 Asts: Charles Mauricie Manning 6 |

Čair Sports Center, Niš
Attendance: 500
Referees: Aleksandar Glišić, Nemanja Vlahović, Vojkan Živković

== Semifinals ==
=== FMP SoccerBet v Mega MIS ===
17 February 2023
17:00

Report

| FMP SoccerBet | 67–86 | Mega MIS |
Scoring by quarter: 24-20, 16-10, 14-22, 13-34
| Pts: Aleksa Stepanović 15; Rebs: Nikola Šaranović 8 Asts: Moore 4 | | Pts: Petar Kovačević 20; Rebs: Matej Rudan, Luka Cerovina 7 Asts: Malcolm Cazalon 6 |

Čair Sports Center, Niš
Attendance: 500
Referees: Jevtovic, Prpa, Pesic

=== Partizan Mozzart Bet v Crvena zvezda Meridianbet ===
17 February 2023
21:00

Report

| Partizan Mozzart Bet | 75–83 | Crvena zvezda Meridianbet |
Scoring by quarter: 21-15, 23-19, 14-25, 17-24
| Pts: James Nunnally 19; Rebs: Mathias Lessort 12; Asts: Aleksa Avramović 4 | | Pts: Luca Vildoza 15; Rebs: Luka Mitrović, Ben Bentil 7 Asts: Facundo Campazzo 7 |

Čair Sports Center, Niš
Attendance: 5200
Referees: Nikolic, Obrknezevic, Calic

== Final ==
18 February 2023
21:00

Report

| Crvena Zvezda Meridianbet | 96–79 | Mega MIS |
Scoring by quarter: 22–23, 29–21, 27–21, 18–14
| Pts: Ognjen Dobrić 24; Rebs: Filip Petrušev 8 Asts: Luca Vildoza 7 | | Pts: Malcolm Cazalon 15; Rebs: Aleksa Uskoković 5 Asts: Ahmaad Rorie 5 |

Čair Sports Center, Niš
Attendance: 2500
Referees: Jevtovic, Prpa, Calic

== See also ==
- 2022–23 Basketball League of Serbia
- 2022–23 KK Crvena zvezda season
- 2022–23 KK Partizan season
- 2022–23 Milan Ciga Vasojević Cup
