= List of 2022–23 PLG season transactions =

This is a list of transactions that took place during the 2022 P. League+ off-season and the 2022–23 PLG season.

== Retirement ==
Date	Name	Team(s) played (years)	Age	Notes	Ref.
April 25	Elliot Tan	Hsinchu JKO Lioneers (2020–2022)	33	Also played overseas.	
December 25	Anthony Tucker	Formosa Taishin Dreamers (2020–2021); Kaohsiung Steelers (2021–2022)	33	PLG Points Leader (2021); PLG Assists Leader (2021); Also played overseas.	
January 5	Oscar Lin	Taipei Fubon Braves (2020–2021)	27	Hired as individual skills coach and interpreter by the Kaohsiung 17LIVE Steelers.	

== Front office movements ==
=== Head coaching changes ===
Off-season

Departure date	Team	Outgoing head coach	Reason for departure	Hire date	Incoming head coach	Last coaching position	Ref.
July 1	Taoyuan Pilots	Yen Hsing-Shu (interim)	Interim	July 1	Iurgi Caminos	Taichung Wagor Suns head coach (2021–2022)	
July 19	Kaohsiung Steelers	Slavoljub Gorunovic (interim)	Interim	July 19	Slavoljub Gorunovic	Kaohsiung Steelers head assistant coach (2021–2022)	
October 28	Kaohsiung 17LIVE Steelers	Slavoljub Gorunovic	Fired	October 28	Hung Chi-Chao (interim)	Kaohsiung Steelers assistant coach (2021–2022)	

In-season

Departure date	Team	Outgoing head coach	Reason for departure	Hire date	Incoming head coach	Last coaching position	Ref.
November 10	Kaohsiung 17LIVE Steelers	Hung Chi-Chao (interim)	Interim	November 10	Dean Murray	Patriots BBC head coach (2020–2021)	
December 29	Kaohsiung 17LIVE Steelers	Dean Murray	Fired	December 29	Hung Chi-Chao (interim)	Kaohsiung 17LIVE Steelers assistant coach (2022–2023)	
January 7	Kaohsiung 17LIVE Steelers	Hung Chi-Chao (interim)	Interim	January 7	Cheng Chih-Lung	Taoyuan Pilots head coach (2021–2022)	
January 10	Formosa Taishin Dreamers	Kyle Julius	Resigned	January 10	Lai Po-Lin	Formosa Taishin Dreamers assistant coach (2017–2023)	

=== General manager changes ===
Off-season

Departure date	Team	Outgoing general manager	Reason for departure	Hire date	Incoming general manager	Last managerial position	Ref.
July 22	Hsinchu JKO Lioneers	Kenny Kao	Resigned	July 26	Hu Lung-Chih	Hsinchu JKO Lioneers president (2020–2022)	
July 22	Kaohsiung Steelers	Chang Chih-Yen	—N/a	July 22	Kenny Kao	Hsinchu JKO Lioneers general manager (2020–2022)	

In-season

Departure date	Team	Outgoing general manager	Reason for departure	Hire date	Incoming general manager	Last managerial position	Ref.
May 1	Hsinchu JKO Lioneers	Hu Lung-Chih	Resigned	—N/a	—N/a	—N/a	

== Player movements ==
=== Trades ===
July
July 14, 2022	To Formosa Taishin Dreamers: Lin Yao-Tsung; Wu Chia-Chun	To Taoyuan Pilots: Chieng Li-Huan; 2022 Dreamers first-round pick
August
August 8, 2022	To New Taipei Kings: Joseph Lin	To Taipei Fubon Braves: Steven Guinchard; Hung Kai-Chieh; 2024 Kings protected first-round pick

=== Free agents ===
Player	Date signed	New team	Former team	Ref
Ricci Rivero	June 24	Taoyuan Pilots	UP	
Lu Kuan-Liang	July 8	Formosa Taishin Dreamers	Yulon Luxgen Dinos (Super Basketball League)	
Chou Po-Chen	July 9	Formosa Taishin Dreamers	Yulon Luxgen Dinos (Super Basketball League)	
Lin Chih-Wei	July 11	Kaohsiung Steelers	Rizing Zephyr Fukuoka (B.League)	
Lin Po-Hao	July 15	Kaohsiung Steelers	Kaohsiung Jeoutai Technology (Super Basketball League)	
Brendon Smart	July 18	Taipei Fubon Braves		
Su Shih-Hsuan	July 18	New Taipei Kings	Bank of Taiwan (Super Basketball League)	
Brandon Gilbeck	July 22	Formosa Taishin Dreamers	Fraser Valley Bandits (Canadian Elite Basketball League)	
Sani Sakakini	July 22	Taoyuan Pilots	Kuwait SC (Kuwaiti Division I Basketball League)	
Mike Singletary	July 25	Taipei Fubon Braves		
Jason Washburn	July 26	Taoyuan Pilots	Fukushima Firebonds (B.League)	
Will Artino	August 5	Hsinchu JKO Lioneers	Tainan TSG GhostHawks (T1 League)	
Sim Bhullar	August 5	Hsinchu JKO Lioneers		
Chiang Kuang-Chien	August 9	Hsinchu JKO Lioneers	Taoyuan Pauian Archiland (Super Basketball League)	
Lu Chi-Min	August 10	Hsinchu JKO Lioneers	Taiwan Beer (Super Basketball League)	
Manny Harris	August 11	Kaohsiung Steelers		
Hsieh Zong-Rong	August 15	Taipei Fubon Braves	Bank of Taiwan (Super Basketball League)	
Vance Jackson	August 18	Kaohsiung Steelers	East Carolina	
Anthony Bennett	August 19	Hsinchu JKO Lioneers	Kaohsiung Steelers	
Chris Johnson	August 22	Taipei Fubon Braves	Auckland Tuatara (National Basketball League)	
Byron Mullens	August 22	New Taipei Kings		
Femi Olujobi	August 22	Kaohsiung Steelers	ESSM Le Portel (LNB Pro A)	
DaJuan Summers	August 24	New Taipei Kings	Mahram Tehran (Iranian Basketball Super League)	
Ihor Zaytsev	August 25	Taipei Fubon Braves		
Jamel Artis	August 26	New Taipei Kings	Cape Town Tigers (South African National Basketball Championship)	
Malcolm Miller	August 30	Formosa Taishin Dreamers	Grises de Humacao (Baloncesto Superior Nacional)	
Lin Chin-Pang	September 1	New Taipei Kings	Taoyuan Pilots (waived on August 31)	
Lu Zong-Lin	September 1	Taipei Fubon Braves	Kaohsiung Jeoutai Technology (Super Basketball League)	
Chiu Po Chang	September 2	Kaohsiung Steelers	Taichung Wagor Suns (T1 League)	
Tsai Wen-Cheng	September 2	Taipei Fubon Braves		
Lin Chih-Chieh	September 7	Taipei Fubon Braves		
Sedrick Barefield	September 8	Taipei Fubon Braves (East Asia Super League contract)	Oklahoma City Blue (NBA G League)	
Andrija Bojić	September 8	Kaohsiung Steelers	Mladost Maxbet (Basketball League of Serbia)	
Sir'Dominic Pointer	September 8	Formosa Taishin Dreamers	APOEL (Cyprus Basketball Division A)	
Kao Cheng-En	September 9	New Taipei Kings	UCH (undrafted in 2022)	
Iong Ngai-San	September 14	Hsinchu JKO Lioneers (development player contract)		
Terrico White	October 21	Hsinchu JKO Lioneers	Brujos de Guayama (Baloncesto Superior Nacional)	
Perry Jones	October 23	Taipei Fubon Braves		
Terrence Jones	October 27	Kaohsiung 17LIVE Steelers	Cariduros de Fajardo (Baloncesto Superior Nacional)	
Kenny Manigault	October 29	New Taipei Kings	Helsinki Seagulls (Korisliiga)	
Austin Daye	November 10	New Taipei Kings	Reyer Venezia (Lega Basket Serie A)	
Jeff Ayres	November 18	Taoyuan Pauian Pilots	Niigata Albirex BB (B.League)	
Aaron Harrison	December 1	Kaohsiung 17LIVE Steelers	Cedevita Olimpija (Premier A Slovenian Basketball League)	
Hung Chih-Shan	December 1	New Taipei Kings		
Sun Szu-Yao	December 7	Kaohsiung 17LIVE Steelers	Taichung Suns (T1 League)	
Nick Faust	December 15	Formosa Taishin Dreamers	Al-Ahli (Bahraini Premier League)	
Viacheslav Kravtsov	December 15	Kaohsiung 17LIVE Steelers	Hestia Menorca (LEB Plata)	
Ilkan Karaman	January 20	Formosa Taishin Dreamers	Manisa Büyükşehir Belediyespor (Basketbol Süper Ligi)	
Jeremy Lin	January 26	Kaohsiung 17LIVE Steelers	Guangzhou Loong Lions (Chinese Basketball Association)	
Chen Tse-Yu	February 2	Hsinchu JKO Lioneers	New Taipei Yulon Luxgen Dinos (Super Basketball League)	
Gokul Natesan	February 2	Kaohsiung 17LIVE Steelers	Steaua CSM EximBank Bucuresti (Liga Națională)	
Chris McCullough	February 27	Formosa Taishin Dreamers	New Taipei Kings (waived on March 18, 2022)	
Jeremy Tyler	March 3	Hsinchu JKO Lioneers	Piratas de Quebradillas (Baloncesto Superior Nacional)	
Wendell Lewis	March 18	Kaohsiung 17LIVE Steelers	OraSi Ravenna (Serie A2)	

=== Going to other Taiwanese leagues ===
Player	Date signed	New team	New league	P. League+ team	Ref
Wu Tai-Hao	July 22	Tainan TSG GhostHawks	T1 League	Hsinchu JKO Lioneers	
Julian Boyd	August 9	Changhua BLL	Super Basketball League	Formosa Taishin Dreamers	
Taylor Braun	August 11	Tainan TSG GhostHawks	T1 League	Kaohsiung Steelers	
Wen Li-Huang	August 19	Taichung Wagor Suns	T1 League	Taoyuan Pilots (waived on July 19)	
Stephan Hicks	August 26	TaiwanBeer HeroBears	T1 League	Formosa Taishin Dreamers (waived on March 28, 2022)	
Cheng Tzu-Yang	August 29	Changhua BLL	Super Basketball League	Formosa Taishin Dreamers (out on loan)	
Chien Wei-Ju	September 1	Tainan TSG GhostHawks	T1 League	Taipei Fubon Braves (waived on August 30)	
Tseng Wen-Ting	September 30	New Taipei CTBC DEA	T1 League	Taipei Fubon Braves	
Sedrick Barefield	October 11	Tainan TSG GhostHawks	T1 League	Taipei Fubon Braves (Waived on October 11)	
Austin Derrick	October 25	Taichung Suns	T1 League	Kaohsiung Steelers (waived on July 25)	
Branden Dawson	November 2	TaiwanBeer HeroBears	T1 League	Hsinchu JKO Lioneers (Waived on March 1, 2022)	
Shih Yen-Tsung	November 23	Changhua BLL	Super Basketball League	Taoyuan Pauian Pilots (out on loan)	
Peng Chun-Yen	December 1	Taichung Suns	T1 League	Kaohsiung 17LIVE Steelers (waived on November 30)	
Jordan Tolbert	December 8	Taiwan Beer	Super Basketball League	Taoyuan Pilots	
Lin Yi-Huei	December 15	Taoyuan Leopards	T1 League	Hsinchu JKO Lioneers (waived on December 15)	
Sim Bhullar	December 16	Tainan TSG GhostHawks	T1 League	Hsinchu JKO Lioneers (waived on December 16)	
Perry Jones	January 6	TaiwanBeer HeroBears	T1 League	Taipei Fubon Braves (waived on January 4)	
Nick Faust	January 12	Tainan TSG GhostHawks	T1 League	Formosa Taishin Dreamers (waived on January 9)	
Lin Ming-Yi	January 29	Taichung Suns	T1 League	Hsinchu JKO Lioneers (waived on January 24)	
Derek King	January 30	Taichung Suns	T1 League	Formosa Taishin Dreamers	

=== Going overseas ===
Player	Date signed	New team	New country	Former P. League+ team	Ref
Devin Robinson	July 5	Piratas de Quebradillas	Puerto Rico	Taoyuan Pilots	
Brandon Gilbeck	July 7	Fraser Valley Bandits	Canada	Formosa Taishin Dreamers	
Thomas Welsh	August 4	Passlab Yamagata Wyverns	Japan	New Taipei Kings	
Mike Bruesewitz	August 10	Mineros de Zacatecas	Mexico	Hsinchu JKO Lioneers	
DeAndre Liggins	September 3	Al-Ahli	Saudi Arabia	New Taipei Kings	
Keith Benson	October 8	BC Juventus	Lithuania	Kaohsiung Steelers	
Nick Faust	October 10	Al-Ahli	Bahrain	Hsinchu JKO Lioneers	
Nemanja Bešović	November 29	Al-Karamah	Syria	Taoyuan Pilots	
Andrija Bojić	December 10	Spartak Subotica	Serbia	Kaohsiung 17LIVE Steelers (waived on November 22)	
Jamel Artis	December 12	Trepça	Kosovo	New Taipei Kings (waived on October 25)	
Vance Jackson	January 7	Al-Arabi	Qatar	Kaohsiung 17LIVE Steelers (waived on October 27)	
Malcolm Miller	January 19	Limoges CSP	France	Formosa Taishin Dreamers (waived on December 15)	
Manny Harris	February 25	Hapoel Holon	Israel	Kaohsiung 17LIVE Steelers (waived on December 26)	
DaJuan Summers	February 26	Homenetmen Beirut	Lebanon	New Taipei Kings (waived on November 10)	
Aaron Harrison	March 1	Capitanes de Arecibo	Puerto Rico	Kaohsiung 17LIVE Steelers (waived on February 6)	
Austin Daye	March 8	Victoria Libertas Pesaro	Italy	New Taipei Kings (waived on March 9)	
Terrico White	March 24	Al-Najma	Bahrain	Hsinchu JKO Lioneers (waived on March 17)	
Viacheslav Kravtsov	April 9	Al-Ittihad	Bahrain	Kaohsiung 17LIVE Steelers (waived on March 18)	
Terrence Jones	April 10	Leones de Ponce	Puerto Rico	Kaohsiung 17LIVE Steelers (waived on December 26)	
Sir'Dominic Pointer	April 14	Basket Brno	Czech Republic	Formosa Taishin Dreamers (waived on March 18)	
Stefan Janković	May 2	Vancouver Bandits	Canada	Formosa Taishin Dreamers	

=== Waived ===
Player	Date	Former team	Ref
Wen Li-Huang	July 19	Taoyuan Pilots	
Austin Derrick	July 25	Kaohsiung Steelers	
Chien Wei-Ju	August 30	Taipei Fubon Braves	
Lin Chin-Pang	August 31	Taoyuan Pilots	
Sedrick Barefield	October 11	Taipei Fubon Braves	
Jamel Artis	October 25	New Taipei Kings	
Vance Jackson	October 27	Kaohsiung 17LIVE Steelers	
Ricci Rivero	November 4	Taoyuan Pauian Pilots	
DaJuan Summers	November 10	New Taipei Kings	
Andrija Bojić	November 22	Kaohsiung 17LIVE Steelers	
Su Chih-Cheng	November 23	Taoyuan Pauian Pilots	
Peng Chun-Yen	November 30	Kaohsiung 17LIVE Steelers	
Lin Yi-Huei	December 15	Hsinchu JKO Lioneers	
Malcolm Miller	December 15	Formosa Taishin Dreamers	
Sim Bhullar	December 16	Hsinchu JKO Lioneers	
Manny Harris	December 26	Kaohsiung 17LIVE Steelers	
Terrence Jones	December 26	Kaohsiung 17LIVE Steelers	
Perry Jones	January 4	Taipei Fubon Braves	
Nick Faust	January 9	Formosa Taishin Dreamers	
Lin Ming-Yi	January 24	Hsinchu JKO Lioneers	
Aaron Harrison	February 6	Kaohsiung 17LIVE Steelers	
Matthew Yang	February 9	Kaohsiung 17LIVE Steelers	
Austin Daye	March 9	New Taipei Kings	
Terrico White	March 17	Hsinchu JKO Lioneers	
Viacheslav Kravtsov	March 18	Kaohsiung 17LIVE Steelers	
Sir'Dominic Pointer	March 18	Formosa Taishin Dreamers	

== Draft ==
Pick	Player	Date signed	Team	Ref
1	Chang Chen-Ya	August 4	Taoyuan Pilots	
2	Chen Fan Po-Yen	August 26	Taipei Fubon Braves	
3	Pai Yao-Cheng	August 4	Taoyuan Pilots	
4	Amdy Dieng	August 4	Taoyuan Pilots	
5	Ifeanyi Eboka	September 16	Hsinchu JKO Lioneers	
6	Jian Ting-Jhao	August 26	Taipei Fubon Braves	
7	Lin Tzu-Wei	August 4	Taoyuan Pilots	
8	Jamarcus Mearidy	August 1	Kaohsiung Steelers	
9	Li Wei-Ting	September 2	New Taipei Kings	
10	Tseng Po-Yu	August 16	Hsinchu JKO Lioneers	
11	Lu Tsai Yu-Lun	—	Taoyuan Pilots	
