= EuroLeague Flight Time of the Season =

The EuroLeague Flight Time of the Season is the annual award for the European top-tier level EuroLeague's player, who "flew the highest" on an individual basketball slam dunk during the league season. The award is also known as the Turkish Airlines EuroLeague Flight Time of the Season, for name sponsorship reasons. The award began in the 2022–23 season.

The winner of the award is selected by an online vote of the fans.

== Flight Time winners ==
Season	Dunk	Winner	Club	Opponent	Ref.
2022–23	Poster dunk	(Serbia) Alen Smailagić	(Serbia) Partizan	(Spain) Real Madrid	
2023–24	Poster dunk	(France) Mathias Lessort	(Greece) Panathinaikos	(Spain) Real Madrid	
2024–25	Alley-oop	(United States) Tyrique Jones	(Serbia) Partizan	(Serbia) Crvena zvezda	
