= Luca Vildoza =

Argentine basketball player (born 1995)

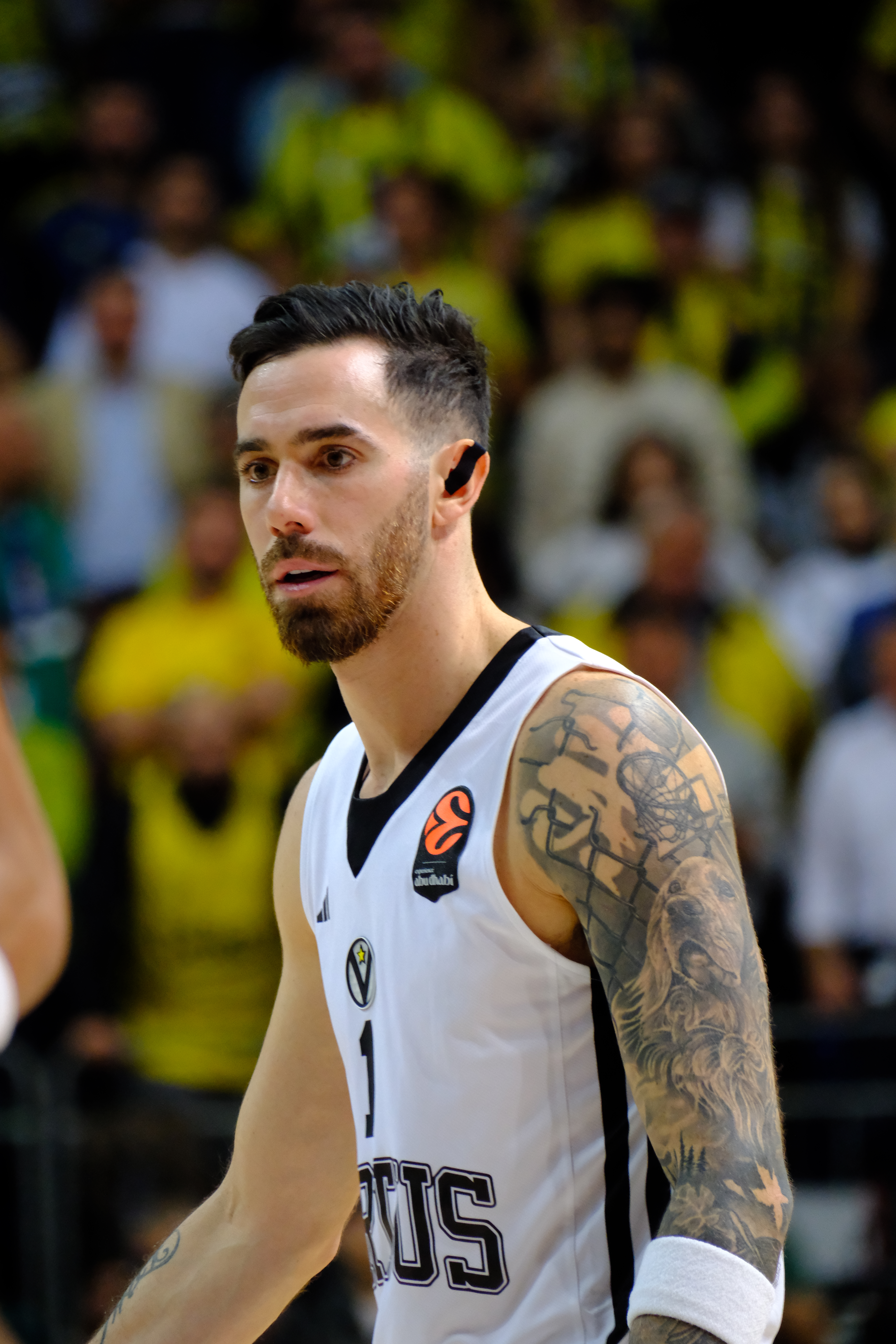
- Vildoza with Virtus Bologna in 2025

No. 3 – Partizan Belgrade
- Position: Point guard / shooting guard
- League: Serbian SuperLeague; ABA League; EuroLeague

Personal information
- Born: August 11, 1995 (age 31) Quilmes, Argentina
- Listed height: 6 ft 3 in (1.91 m)
- Listed weight: 190 lb (86 kg)

Career information
- NBA draft: 2017: undrafted
- Playing career: 2012–present

Career history
- 2012–2016: Quilmes
- 2016–2021: Baskonia
- 2016–2017: →Quilmes
- 2022: Milwaukee Bucks
- 2022–2023: Crvena zvezda
- 2023–2024: Panathinaikos
- 2024–2025: Olympiacos
- 2025–2026: Virtus Bologna
- 2026–present: Partizan

Career highlights
- EuroLeague champion (2024); EuroLeague steals leader (2026); Liga ACB champion (2020); 2× Greek League champion (2024, 2025); Serbian League champion (2023); Serbian Cup winner (2023); Greek Super Cup winner (2024); Liga ACB Finals MVP (2020); All-LNB Second Team (2017); Greek All-Star (2023); Liga ACB steals leader (2019)
- Stats at NBA.com
- Stats at Basketball Reference
Medals
Men's basketball
Representing Argentina
World Cup
Silver medal – second place	2019 China
FIBA AmeriCup
Silver medal – second place	2017 Argentina
Pan American Games
Gold medal – first place	2019 Lima
South American Games
Gold medal – first place	2014 Chile

Luca Vildoza (born August 11, 1995) is an Argentine professional basketball player for Partizan Belgrade of the Serbian SuperLeague, the ABA League, and the EuroLeague. He also represents the Argentine national team in international competition. At 1.91 m (6 ft 3 in) tall, he plays at both the point guard and shooting guard positions.

== Professional career ==
=== Quilmes (2012–2017) ===
Vildoza began his career with the Argentine 1st Division (LNB) club Quilmes, in the 2011–12 LNB season. He then played in the Argentine 2nd Division with Quilmes during the TNA 2012–13 season. He spent the next three seasons playing in the top-tier level Argentine League with Quilmes.

=== Baskonia (2016–2021) ===
In 2016, Vildoza signed a four-year contract with the Liga ACB club Baskonia. However, Baskonia loaned him back to Quilmes for the 2016–17 season where he averaged 16.9 points and 3.9 assists per game. He rejoined Baskonia for the 2017–18 season and made a debut in the EuroLeague. Over 24 EuroLeague games, he averaged 4.5 points, 2 assists, and 1.3 rebounds per game. In the Liga ACB, he appeared in 25 games and averaged 5.9 points while shooting 50% from the field goal and 40.4% from the three-point line. Baskonia made the ACB Playoffs Finals that season and lost the final 3–1 to Real Madrid.

In the 2018–19 season, Vildoza's role in the team increased, and so did his stats, as he averaged 9.1 points and 3.8 assists over 34 games of the EuroLeague. In March 2019, Vildoza signed a contract extension with Baskonia to stay until the end of 2023–24 season. In the Liga ACB, he appeared in 32 games, averaging 9.3 points per game. In the ACB Quarterfinals, Baskonia lost 2–0 to Zaragoza.

=== Milwaukee Bucks (2022) ===
On May 6, 2021, Vildoza signed with the New York Knicks, but was waived on October 3 after playing two 2021 NBA Summer League games. On October 5, Vildoza announced that he had undergone surgery on his right foot.

On April 6, 2022, Vildoza was signed by the Milwaukee Bucks to a reported two-year contract. On April 22, Vildoza made his NBA debut in game three of a first-round playoff series against the Chicago Bulls. Vildoza was subbed in during the fourth quarter at the 8:02 mark. Vildoza made a three-point shot, grabbed a rebound, recorded two assists, and recorded two steals as the Bucks won 111–81. On July 5, he was waived by the Bucks. On July 9, the Bucks re-signed Vildoza to an Exhibit 10 contract.

=== Crvena zvezda (2022–2023) ===
On October 14, 2022, Vildoza was signed by Crvena zvezda mts of the Adriatic League and the EuroLeague to a reported two-year contract. At the end of the month, he received the ABA League Player of the Month Award. In 29 EuroLeague games (24 starts), he averaged 12.6 points, 2.5 rebounds, 3.9 assists, 1.4 steals and 2.6 turnovers, playing around 24 minutes per contest.

=== Panathinaikos (2023–2024) ===
On June 26, 2023, Vildoza signed a three-year contract with Greek powerhouse Panathinaikos. On July 2, 2024, Vildoza amicably parted ways with Panathinaikos, having lifted both the domestic championship as well as the EuroLeague title for the first time in his career.

=== Olympiacos (2024–2025) ===
On July 2, 2024, Vildoza signed a two-year deal with Greek Basket League runner-ups and EuroLeague bronze medalists Olympiacos. On June 25, 2025, he was released from the Greek club.

=== Virtus Bologna (2025–2026) ===
On June 25, 2025, Vildoza signed a three-year deal with Virtus Bologna of the Italian Lega Basket Serie A (LBA) and the EuroLeague.

=== Partizan (2026–present) ===
On July 26, 2026, Vildoza signed a two-year deal with Partizan of the Serbian SuperLeague, the ABA League, and the EuroLeague.

== National team career ==
Vildoza was a member of the junior national teams of Argentina. He played with Argentina's junior national team at the 2012 FIBA Under-17 World Cup. He is also a member of the senior men's Argentine national basketball team. With Argentina's senior team, he has played at the 2014 ODESUR Games, the 2015 Pan American Games, the 2016 South American Championship, and the 2017 FIBA AmeriCup.

In 2019, Vildoza took part in the team that won the Pan American gold medal in Lima. Vildoza was included in the Argentine squad for the 2019 FIBA Basketball World Cup and clinched the silver medal with Argentina, which emerged as runners-up to Spain at the 2019 FIBA Basketball World Cup.

== Career statistics ==
Legend
GP	Games played	GS	Games started	MPG	Minutes per game
FG%	Field-goal percentage	3P%	3-point field-goal percentage	FT%	Free-throw percentage
RPG	Rebounds per game	APG	Assists per game	SPG	Steals per game
BPG	Blocks per game	PPG	Points per game	PIR	Performance index rating
**Bold**	Career high

=== NBA ===
==== Playoffs ====
Year	Team	GP	GS	MPG	FG%	3P%	FT%	RPG	APG	SPG	BPG	PPG
2022	Milwaukee	7	0	2.4	.333	.200	—	.3	.6	.3	—	.7
Career		7	0	2.4	.333	.200	—	.3	.6	.3	—	.7

=== EuroLeague ===
†	Denotes seasons in which Vildoza won the EuroLeague

Year	Team	GP	GS	MPG	FG%	3P%	FT%	RPG	APG	SPG	BPG	PPG	PIR
2017–18	Baskonia	24	2	13.2	**.422**	**.412**	.696	1.3	2.0	.5	.1	4.5	3.9
2018–19	Baskonia	**34**	17	22.5	.403	.372	.879	2.3	3.8	1.1	.1	9.1	9.6
2019–20	Baskonia	16	7	23.1	.382	.288	**1.000**	1.9	3.2	1.1	**.4**	7.1	6.9
2020–21	Baskonia	32	18	**25.1**	.410	.388	.761	2.0	3.5	**1.6**	.1	10.3	10.2
2022–23	Crvena zvezda	29	**24**	24.2	.416	.355	.901	**2.5**	**3.9**	1.4	.1	**12.6**	**12.2**
2023–24†	Panathinaikos	28	5	14.9	.385	.366	.762	1.5	1.5	.6	—	5.7	4.6
Career		163	73	20.7	.408	.366	.842	2.0	3.0	1.1	.1	8.5	8.2

=== Domestic leagues ===
Year	Team	League	GP	MPG	FG%	3P%	FT%	RPG	APG	SPG	BPG	PPG
2011–12	(Argentina) Quilmes	LNB	15	4.8	.222	.250	.500	.3	.2	.5	.1	1.3
2013–14	(Argentina) Quilmes	LNB	33	17.5	.350	.270	.613	1.8	1.6	1.0	.2	5.2
2014–15	(Argentina) Quilmes	LNB	62	22.4	.423	.311	.810	1.8	1.2	1.1	.4	11.7
2015–16	(Argentina) Quilmes	LNB	35	26.3	.439	.356	.826	3.6	2.5	1.1	.3	14.2
2016–17	(Argentina) Quilmes	LNB	67	32.0	.400	.341	.856	4.1	4.0	1.7	.2	17.1
2017–18	(Spain) Baskonia	ACB	35	13.8	.485	.434	.891	1.3	1.9	.6	.1	6.3
2018–19	(Spain) Baskonia	ACB	34	24.2	.432	.340	.857	2.0	3.4	1.6	.2	9.0
2019–20	(Spain) Baskonia	ACB	19	23.3	.378	.316	.870	2.8	2.7	1.3	.3	8.0
2020–21	(Spain) Baskonia	ACB	27	23.5	.420	.355	.829	1.7	3.7	1.6	.1	10.9
2022–23	(Serbia) Crvena zvezda	KLS	29	13.4	1.000	—	.500	—	4.0	1.0	—	5.0
2023–24	(Greece) Panathinaikos	GBL	23	18.7	.386	.341	.750	1.4	2.8	1.0	.1	6.3
