= Marko Baković =

Croatian basketball player

Latina Basket
- Position: Power forward
- League: Italy 3rd Division

Personal information
- Born: February 22, 1993 (age 33) Tomislavgrad, Bosnia and Herzegovina
- Listed height: 2.06 m (6 ft 9 in)

Career information
- Playing career: 2012–present

Career history
- 2012–2013: Đuro Đaković
- 2013–2014: HKK Čapljina Lasta
- 2014–2015: G.S. Robur Basket Osimo
- 2015–2016: Kvarner 2010
- 2016–2017: AKK Vern
- 2017–2019: Gorica
- 2019–2020: Thor Thorlakshofn
- 2020–2022: Gorica
- 2022–2023: Cibona
- 2023: Força Lleida CE
- 2023–2024: MZT Skopje
- 2024–2025: Zadar
- 2025–present: Latina Basket

Career highlights
- Macedonian League champion (2024); Croatian League champion (2025); Croatian Cup winner (2023); Macedonian Cup winner (2024); 2× Macedonian Basketball Super Cup winner (2023, 2024)

Marko Baković (born 22 February 1993) is a Croatian-Bosnian professional basketball player, currently playing for Latina Basket in the Italy 3rd Division.

== Playing career ==
On October 2, 2022, he scored 9 points against Partizan Mozzart in his debut in ABA League. On 30 July 2023, Baković signed a contract with MZT Skopje of the Macedonian League for the 2023–24 season. On October 10, 2023, he made his debut in ABA League Second Division for MZT Skopje against KK Cedevita Junior where he scored 7 points and one rebound
