= Alen Smailagić =

Serbian basketball player (born 2000)

No. 9 – Galatasaray
- Position: Center / power forward
- League: Basketbol Süper Ligi; Basketball Champions League

Personal information
- Born: 18 August 2000 (age 26) Belgrade, Serbia, FR Yugoslavia
- Listed height: 2.08 m (6 ft 10 in)
- Listed weight: 98 kg (216 lb)

Career information
- NBA draft: 2019: 2nd round, 39th overall pick
- Drafted by: New Orleans Pelicans
- Playing career: 2017–present

Career history
- 2017–2018: Beko
- 2018–2019: Santa Cruz Warriors
- 2019–2021: Golden State Warriors
- 2019–2021: →Santa Cruz Warriors
- 2021–2024: Partizan
- 2024–2025: Žalgiris Kaunas
- 2025–2026: Virtus Bologna
- 2026–present: Galatasaray

Career highlights
- LKL champion (2025); King Mindaugas Cup winner (2025); ABA League champion (2023); EuroLeague Flight Time (2023)
- Stats at NBA.com
- Stats at Basketball Reference

Alen Smailagić (Serbian Cyrillic: Ален Смаилагић; born 18 August 2000) is a Serbian professional basketball player for Galatasaray of the Turkish Basketbol Süper Ligi (BSL) and the Basketball Champions League.

Smailagić was the youngest player in history to play in the NBA G League.

== Early career ==
Smailagić was born in Belgrade, FR Yugoslavia (present-day Serbia).

Smailagić started to play basketball with his hometown club Beko. In 2012, he joined their youth system. In the 2017–18 season, Smailagić played for Beko in the Junior Serbian League and averaged 21.7 points, 11.1 rebounds and 1.9 blocks per game over 19 games. He was named the Junior Serbian League MVP.

== Professional career ==
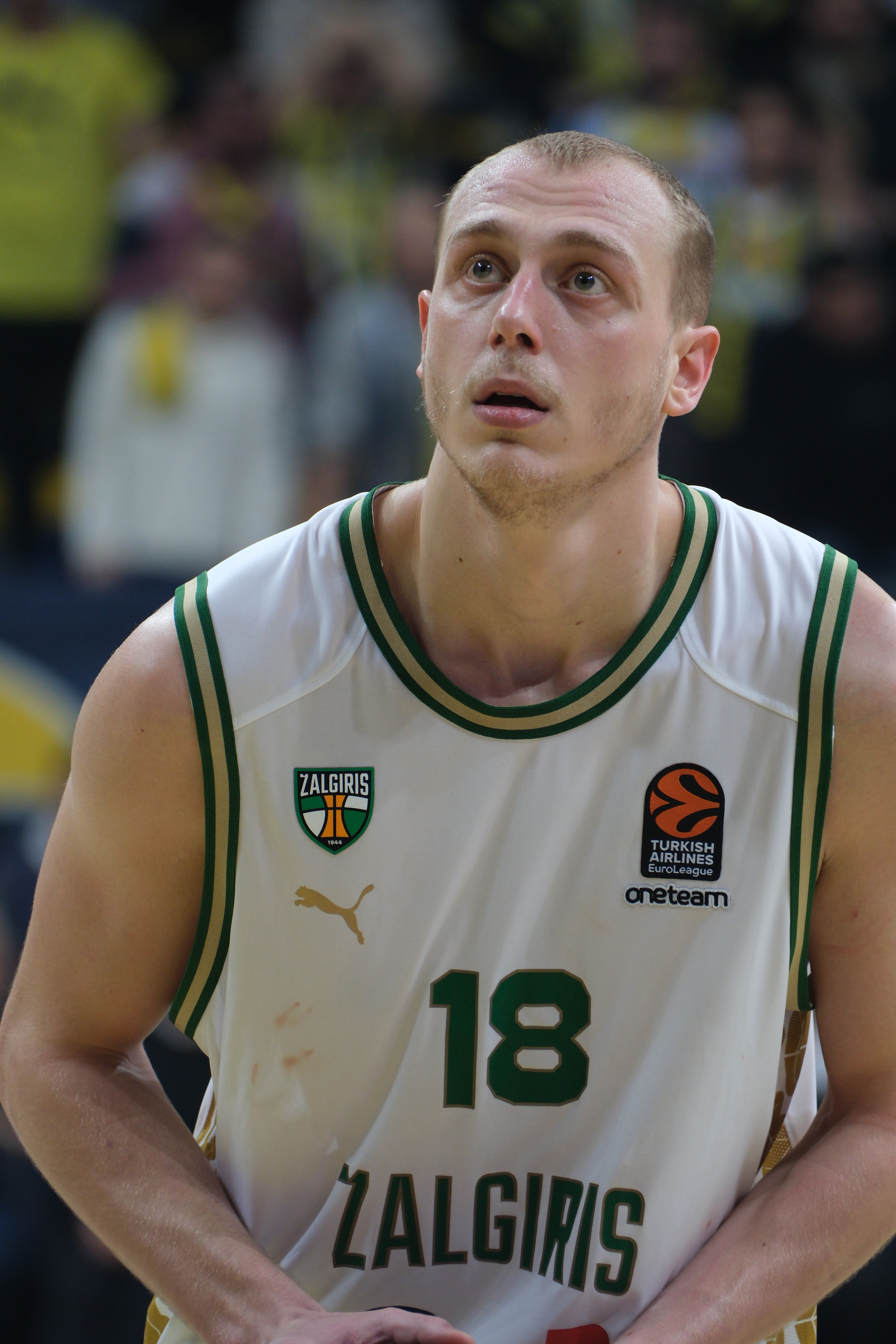
Smailagić with Žalgiris Kaunas in 2025

=== Beko (2017–2018) ===
Smailagić made his senior debut for Beko of the semi-professional 3rd-tier Serbian Regional League in the 2017–18 season. Over ten league games, he averaged 15.9 points, 5.0 rebounds and 2.1 blocks per game.

=== Santa Cruz Warriors (2018–2019) ===
On 20 October 2018, Smailagić was selected as the 4th pick on the 2018 NBA G League draft by the South Bay Lakers, but he was traded right away to the Golden State Warriors-affiliated Santa Cruz Warriors, which makes him the youngest player in the history of the NBA G League. Smailagić made his debut for the Warriors on 3 November 2018, scoring 3 points in 7 minutes he spent on the court. Over 47 league games, he averaged 9.1 points, 4.0 rebounds and 1.0 assists per game.

=== Golden State Warriors (2019–2021) ===
Smailagić was drafted as the 39th pick of the 2019 NBA draft by the New Orleans Pelicans. He is the third international player drafted into the NBA from the NBA G League, joining Greek forward Thanasis Antetokounmpo and Nigerian center Chukwudiebere Maduabum, and the seventh overall to play in the NBA's official minor league before being drafted by an NBA team. Smailagić was then traded to the Golden State Warriors in exchange for the draft rights to two future second-round picks along with cash considerations. Smailagić officially signed a multi-year contract with the Warriors on 11 July 2019. Smailagić made his regular-season debut on 27 December 2019, recording 4 points and a rebound in a 105–96 win over the Phoenix Suns.

On 4 August 2021, the Warriors waived Smailagić. He appeared in 29 games (one start) over two seasons with Golden State, averaging 3.0 points and 1.5 rebounds in 7.7 minutes per game.

=== Partizan (2021–2024) ===
On August 6, 2021, Smailagić officially signed a three-year deal with his hometown club Partizan, under head coach Željko Obradović. During the 2022–23 season, Smailagić for the first time played in EuroLeague where Partizan was eliminated from the Real Madrid in tight playoffs series. Over the season, Smailagić averaged 5.4 points and 2 rebounds per game. Partizan ended the 2022–23 season by lifting the ABA League championship trophy, after 3–2 score against Crvena zvezda in the Finals series.

Over 2023–24 season, Smailagić averaged 5.5 points and 2.2 rebounds in 31 EuroLeague games. The season was deemed to be unsuccessful for Partizan as they finished the season without lifting any trophy.

=== Žalgiris (2024–2025) ===
On 28 June 2024, Smailagić signed a two-year (1+1) contract with Žalgiris Kaunas of the Lithuanian Basketball League (LKL) and the EuroLeague.

=== Virtus Bologna (2025–2026) ===
On 9 July 2025, Smailagić signed a two-year contract with Virtus Bologna of the Italian Lega Basket Serie A (LBA) and the EuroLeague.

=== Galatasaray (2026–present) ===
On August 6, 2026, Smailagić signed a contract with the Turkish team Galatasaray of the Basketbol Süper Ligi.

== National team career ==
Smailagić was a member of the Serbian under-16 national team that competed at the 2016 FIBA Europe Under-16 Championship in Radom, Poland. Over seven tournament games, he averaged 5.0 points, 5.7 rebounds and 0.3 assists per game.

== Career statistics ==
Legend
GP	Games played	GS	Games started	MPG	Minutes per game
FG%	Field-goal percentage	3P%	3-point field-goal percentage	FT%	Free-throw percentage
RPG	Rebounds per game	APG	Assists per game	SPG	Steals per game
BPG	Blocks per game	PPG	Points per game	PIR	Performance index rating
**Bold**	Career high

=== NBA ===
Year	Team	GP	GS	MPG	FG%	3P%	FT%	RPG	APG	SPG	BPG	PPG
2019–20	Golden State	14	0	**9.9**	**.500**	.231	**.842**	**1.9**	**.9**	.2	.3	**4.2**
2020–21	Golden State	**15**	**1**	5.6	.407	**.400**	.333	1.1	.3	.2	.3	1.9
Career		29	1	7.7	.463	.304	.720	1.5	.6	.2	.3	3.0

=== EuroLeague ===
Year	Team	GP	GS	MPG	FG%	3P%	FT%	RPG	APG	SPG	BPG	PPG	PIR
2022–23	Partizan	30	**13**	10.7	.555	**.465**	.629	2.0	.4	.5	.4	5.4	5.0
2023–24	Partizan	**31**	11	**15.9**	**.598**	.462	**.737**	2.2	**.6**	**.6**	.4	5.5	6.3
2024–25	Žalgiris	29	7	15.0	.549	.349	.734	**2.9**	.4	.4	**.6**	**8.1**	**7.8**
Career		90	31	13.8	.565	.409	.703	2.4	.5	.5	.5	6.3	6.3

=== EuroCup ===
Year	Team	GP	GS	MPG	FG%	3P%	FT%	RPG	APG	SPG	BPG	PPG	PIR
2021–22	Partizan	15	8	22.5	.440	.314	.744	4.9	1.2	1.0	.7	7.8	10.2
Career		15	8	22.5	.440	.314	.744	4.9	1.2	1.0	.7	7.8	10.2

=== Domestic leagues ===
Year	Team	League	GP	MPG	FG%	3P%	FT%	RPG	APG	SPG	BPG	PPG
2018–19	(United States) Santa Cruz Warriors	G League	47	17.4	.495	.244	.659	4.0	1.0	.9	.9	9.1
2019–20	(United States) Santa Cruz Warriors	G League	19	25.9	.512	.341	.585	6.2	1.4	1.0	.8	15.2
2020–21	(United States) Santa Cruz Warriors	G League	10	17.0	.517	.150	.667	4.4	1.5	.4	.8	7.5
2021–22	(Serbia) Partizan	ABA	30	19.2	.558	.295	.774	4.3	1.1	.8	.5	8.1
2022–23	(Serbia) Partizan	ABA	29	16.5	.626	.460	.697	3.3	.8	1.0	.7	9.1
2023–24	(Serbia) Partizan	KLS	4	14.4	.500	.667	.750	1.2	1.2	1.0	1.5	4.0
2023–24	(Serbia) Partizan	ABA	31	16.6	.512	.304	.705	2.5	1.1	.6	.3	5.5
2024–25	(Lithuania) Žalgiris	LKL	39	17.3	.590	.422	.800	3.4	.8	.4	.4	10.1

== Personal life ==
Smailagić's father comes from Dubovo, while his mother comes from Lipica, with both places being located in Tutin, in southwestern Serbia. Smailagić is a Serbian Muslim.

== See also ==
- List of Serbian NBA players
