= Mathias Lessort =

French basketball player (born 1995)

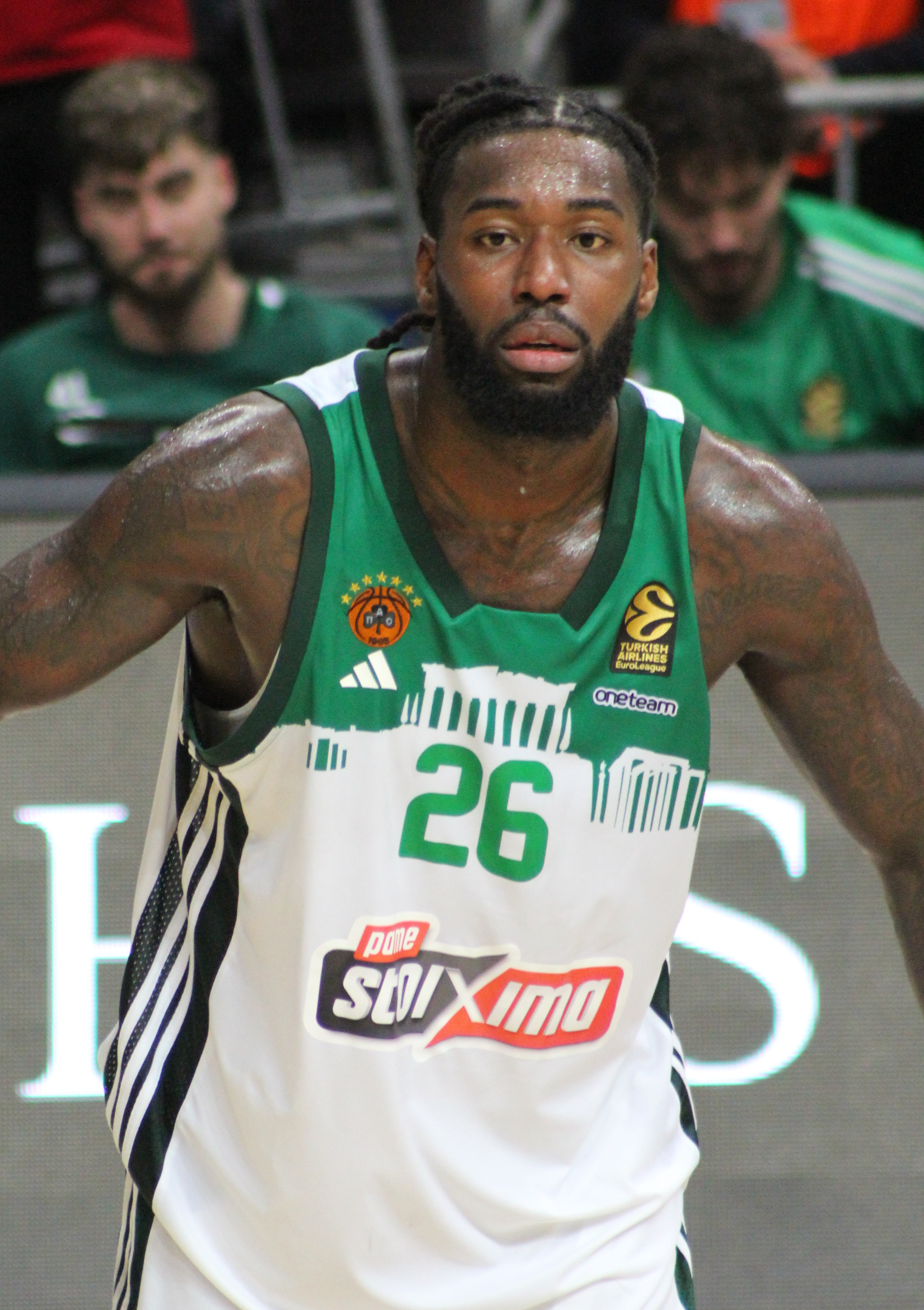
- Lessort with Panathinaikos in 2024

No. 26 – Panathinaikos
- Position: Center
- League: Greek Basketball League; EuroLeague

Personal information
- Born: 29 September 1995 (age 31) Fort-de-France, Martinique
- Listed height: 2.06 m (6 ft 9 in)
- Listed weight: 116 kg (256 lb)

Career information
- NBA draft: 2017: 2nd round, 50th overall pick
- Drafted by: Philadelphia 76ers
- Playing career: 2014–present

Career history
- 2014–2016: Élan Chalon
- 2016–2017: Nanterre 92
- 2017–2018: Crvena zvezda
- 2018–2019: Unicaja Málaga
- 2019–2020: Bayern Munich
- 2020–2021: AS Monaco
- 2021: Maccabi Tel Aviv
- 2021–2023: Partizan
- 2023–present: Panathinaikos

Career highlights
- EuroLeague champion (2024); 2× All-EuroLeague First Team (2023, 2024); EuroLeague rebounding leader (2023); EuroLeague Flight Time (2024); EuroCup champion (2021); All-EuroCup First Team (2021); All-EuroCup Second Team (2019); FIBA Europe Cup champion (2017); Greek League champion (2024); 2x Greek Cup winner (2025, 2026); All-Greek League Team (2024); Greek League Most Spectacular Player (2024); ABA League champion (2023); Serbian League champion (2018); All-ABA League Team (2023); ABA League Defensive Player of the Year (2023); French Cup winner (2017); LNB Pro A Sixth Man of the Year (2016)
- Stats at Basketball Reference
Medals
Men's basketball
Representing France
Olympic Games
Silver medal – second place	2024 Paris	Team
FIBA World Cup
Bronze medal – third place	2019 China

Mathias Michel Lessort (born 29 September 1995) is a French professional basketball player for Panathinaikos of the Greek Basketball League (GBL) and the EuroLeague. He stands 206 cm (6’9’’) tall and plays at the center position. A two-time All-EuroLeague First Team selection in 2023 and 2024, Lessort won the EuroLeague title in 2024 with Panathinaikos.

== Early life ==
Born in the French overseas department of Martinique and raised in Le Morne-Vert until the age of 15, Lessort joined the youth ranks of Élan Chalon in 2010 and won the French national championship with Chalon's cadet team in 2012 and 2013 and with their development team ("Espoirs") in 2013. He also helped Chalon win the 2013 Trophée du Futur.

== Personal life ==
Lessort is married to Traicy, and together they have two children.

== Professional career ==
=== Early years ===
Lessort was handed his first professional contract by the club in June 2014 and made his debut in the French top-flight Pro A during the 2014–15 season. Before turning professional, he had considered enrolling at a university in the United States and had been in touch with Gonzaga and North Carolina State.

He saw action in 23 games as a rookie, chipping in with 2.0 points a game, while pulling down 2.0 rebounds per contest. In 2015–16, he logged his first minutes in a European club competition, the FIBA Europe Cup.

In April 2016, he declared for the NBA draft, but later withdrew. On 1 June 2016 he joined JSF Nanterre of the French Pro A on a three-year deal. In April 2017, Lessort won both the French Basketball Cup and the FIBA Europe Cup championships with Nanterre.

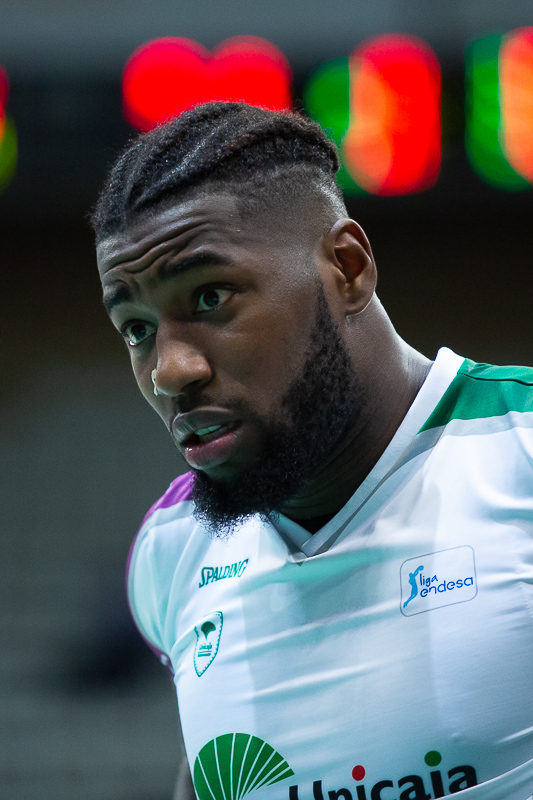
Lessort with Unicaja in 2018

On 11 August 2017 Lessort signed a three-year deal with the Serbian club Crvena zvezda. He played there only in the 2017–18 season, before signing with Spanish ACB side Unicaja in July 2018.

Lessort spent the 2019–20 season in Germany with Bayern Munich.

=== AS Monaco (2020–2021) ===
On 18 September 2020, Lessort signed with AS Monaco of the French LNB Pro A.

=== Maccabi Tel Aviv (2021) ===
On 25 September 2021, Lessort signed a 2-month contract with Maccabi Tel Aviv of the Israeli Premier League in order to replace the injured Ante Žižić. In five games, Lessort averaged 7.4 points and 3.4 rebounds per game. He parted ways with the team on 26 November.

=== Partizan Belgrade (2021–2023) ===
On 20 December 2021, Lessort signed with KK Partizan of the Basketball League of Serbia, the ABA League and the EuroCup.

On 18 July 2022, he signed a new contract with Partizan. Under coach Željko Obradović. He was one of the most useful players in the Euroleague, he was in the first team of the Euroleague, and he was also one of the main candidates for the MVP title. During the 2022–23 season, Partizan was eliminated from the Real Madrid in tight playoffs series. Over the season, Lessort averaged 12 points and 7.1 rebounds per game. Partizan ended the 2022–23 season by lifting the ABA League championship trophy, after 3–2 score against Crvena zvezda in the Finals series.

In March 2023, Lessort was involved in a physical altercation after an ABA League derby between Partizan and Crvena zvezda, following provocation by Filip Petrusev. In the moments after full-time, Lessort shoved Petrusev and then struck him in the face. He later apologized for his reaction, saying he felt his dignity had been impinged.

He was suspended for three games and fined €10,000 for the incident.

=== Panathinaikos (2023–present) ===
On 27 June 2023, Lessort signed a two-year contract with Greek powerhouse Panathinaikos. On February 29, 2024, in a 97–86 win against Real Madrid, Lessort set his EuroLeague career-high of 26 points, alongside 7 rebounds and 4 assists. On May 26, 2024, Lessort helped Panathinaikos win its seventh EuroLeague title by scoring 17 points and recording 6 rebounds in a 95–80 win over Real Madrid in the final.

On December 19, 2024, during a EuroLeague match against Baskonia, Lessort suffered a serious fibula fracture in his left leg. The injury caused panic inside the arena, with several fans fainting and one suffering a heart attack. He underwent successful surgery the following day at Ygeia Hospital, performed by team physician Dr. Athanasios Konidis. Initial estimates suggested an absence of approximately four months.

On December 31, 2024, and whilst being injured, Lessort officially signed the newly offered three-year contract extension with the defending EuroLeague champions through 2028.

Despite the severity of the injury, Lessort began rehabilitation quickly and made a surprising return during the 2025 EuroLeague Final Four in Abu Dhabi, where he logged minutes in the semifinal against Fenerbahçe. However, he was later omitted from Panathinaikos's roster for the domestic league finals against Olympiacos. Team doctor Thanasis Konidis stated that Lessort had been medically cleared to play, but the coaching staff opted to rest him to allow confidence and rhythm to return gradually rather than due to any renewed medical restriction.

On 29 September 2025, Panathinaikos head coach Ergin Ataman provided an update on Lessort's recovery from his serious fibula fracture. Ataman confirmed that while Lessort was progressing, he was not yet ready to return to full team activities. The club intended to act cautiously, and Lessort was expected to be available for selection in November. Ataman stressed that Lessort's participation in the EuroLeague Final Four was not a misjudgment, noting that the player had completed one month of intensive individual and partial team training prior to the tournament. “He'll return in November, about 1–1.5 months from now,” Ataman said.

However, on 7 November 2025, the club issued a further statement indicating that Lessort's recovery plan remained unclear. During his reintegration phase he experienced discomfort in his left ankle, and new imaging revealed bone oedema, prompting a reassessment of his treatment strategy. The statement noted that a decision was yet to be made regarding whether he would continue with conservative treatment or undergo surgery. As a result, no definitive timetable for his return to full team participation was given.

On 17 November 2025, Panathinaikos and head coach Ergin Ataman provided an update on Lessort's recovery. They confirmed that he had been experiencing persistent discomfort in his left ankle and that new imaging revealed bone oedema. The club stated that a final decision on whether to continue with conservative treatment or proceed with surgery was still pending, and no definitive timetable for his return to full team participation was given.

He eventually returned to action on March 12th in a home game against Zalgiris Kaunas, recording 9 points and 3 rebounds in 23 minutes of play.

In July 2026, Lessort underwent elbow surgery to correct a persistent issue that troubled him during the 2025-2026 season.

On October 10, 2026, he was named the EuroLeague Round 4 Most Valuable Player. He scored 19 points, 8 rebounds, 1 assist, 1 steal and 1 block. It is the fourth MVP of the Round award of his career and the first since his fibula injury.

=== NBA draft rights ===
Lessort was drafted in the second round as the 50th pick in the 2017 NBA draft by the Philadelphia 76ers. In July 2019, his draft rights were traded to the Los Angeles Clippers as part of a four-team trade. On 19 November 2020 his draft rights were traded to the Minnesota Timberwolves. Lessort's draft rights were traded again, to the New York Knicks, on 20 November.

On February 6, 2025, Lessort's draft rights were included in a four-team trade and ultimately acquired by the Milwaukee Bucks.

== National team career ==
Lessort played in the 2013 Nike Global Challenge, averaging 19.5 points, 7.8 rebounds and 1.3 blocks a game, while receiving International All-Tournament Team honors.

He represented France at the 2014 and 2015 U20 European Championships. In 2015, he averaged 4.1 points and 5.1 rebounds en route to a semifinal appearance.

As a member of the French men's national team, he captured a bronze medal at the 2019 World Cup and a silver medal at the 2024 Olympics in Paris.

In 2025, Lessort was included in France's preliminary roster for EuroBasket 2025, but withdrew from the extended squad having still not fully recovered from a fibula fracture he sustained in December 2024. He was replaced by Yoan Makoundou in the 18-man training camp roster.

== Career statistics ==
Legend
GP	Games played	GS	Games started	MPG	Minutes per game
FG%	Field-goal percentage	3P%	3-point field-goal percentage	FT%	Free-throw percentage
RPG	Rebounds per game	APG	Assists per game	SPG	Steals per game
BPG	Blocks per game	PPG	Points per game	PIR	Performance index rating
**Bold**	Career high

=== EuroLeague ===
†	Competition Winner
*	Led the league
Injured	Denotes season with 50%+ of games missed due to injury

Year	Team	GP	GS	MPG	FG%	3P%	FT%	RPG	APG	SPG	BPG	PPG	PIR
2017–18	Crvena zvezda	30	**29**	21.1	.549	.000	.632	5.7	.8	.8	.7	8.5	10.7
2019–20	Bayern Munich	22	4	11.3	.528	—	.600	2.2	.5	.5	.5	3.8	4.2
2021–22	Maccabi Tel Aviv	5	3	11.7	**.737**	—	.562	3.4	.6	**1.0**	—	7.4	9.2
2022–23	Partizan	38	23	**30.2**	.674	.000	**.734**	**7.1***	1.4	.9	.8	12.0	19.1
2023–24†	Panathinaikos	**41***	**29**	29.4	.624	.000	.607	6.3	1.4	**1.0**	**.9**	**13.9**	19.6
2024–25 (injured)	Panathinaikos	19	16	25.4	**.714**	.000	.644	6.5	**1.6**	**1.0**	.7	13.0	20.1
2025–26 (injured)	Panathinaikos	14	13	22.6	.588	.000	.667	5.6	1.2	.7	.5	8.3	12.1
Career		169	117	24.3	.628	.000	.647	5.7	1.2	.8	.7	10.6	10.4

=== EuroCup ===
Year	Team	GP	GS	MPG	FG%	3P%	FT%	RPG	APG	SPG	BPG	PPG	PIR
2018–19	Málaga	19	11	21.9	**.701**	—	.602	5.4	**1.1**	.9	**1.3**	11.0	16.6
2020–21	Monaco	**23**	**17**	**24.6**	.583	.000	.672	6.1	**1.1**	.9	1.2	12.5	17.8
2021–22	Partizan	10	4	23.4	.634	—	**.683**	**6.4**	1.0	**1.0**	.5	**13.1**	**19.1**
Career		52	32	23.4	.630	.000	.651	5.9	1.1	.9	1.1	12.1	17.6

=== FIBA Europe Cup ===
Year	Team	GP	GS	MPG	FG%	3P%	FT%	RPG	APG	SPG	BPG	PPG
2015–16	Élan Chalon	18	6	16.1	.623	—	**.721**	5.0	**.8**	.4	.9	7.2
2016–17	Nanterre	**20**	**18**	**21.3**	**.634**	.000	.689	**6.3**	.6	**.7**	**1.3**	**9.9**
Career		38	24	18.8	.630	.000	.705	5.7	.7	.6	1.1	8.6

=== Domestic leagues ===
Year	Team	League	GP	MPG	FG%	3P%	FT%	RPG	APG	SPG	BPG	PPG
2014–15	(France) Élan Chalon	Pro A	23	5.9	.586	.000	.667	2.3	.1	.3	.2	2.2
2015–16	(France) Élan Chalon	Pro A	34	12.4	.625	**1.000**	.633	4.4	.7	.4	.8	5.6
2016–17	(France) Nanterre	Pro A	36	**22.9**	.574	**1.000**	.593	**7.2**	.7	.7	1.0	10.2
2017–18	(Serbia) Crvena zvezda	KLS	15	12.0	.563	.500	.657	3.8	.4	.7	.3	4.0
2017–18	(Serbia) Crvena zvezda	ABA	29	18.4	.671	—	.608	4.4	.6	.9	.9	8.8
2018–19	(Spain) Málaga	ACB	**37**	20.0	.566	—	.647	5.3	1.0	.9	.5	8.6
2019–20	(Germany) Bayern Munich	BBL	19	15.8	.620	—	.565	3.9	.8	.8	**1.1**	6.5
2020–21	(France) Monaco	LNB Élite	31	21.7	.610	.000	.565	5.6	**2.0**	1.0	.7	**10.8**
2021–22	(Serbia) Partizan	ABA	22	22.8	.632	—	.664	5.9	1.6	.7	.9	10.1
2022–23	(Serbia) Partizan	ABA	32	21.6	**.692**	—	**.704**	5.2	1.4	**1.1**	.6	9.3
2023–24†	(Greece) Panathinaikos	GBL	28	21.0	.630	.000	.674	5.1	1.0	1.0	.6	**10.8**
2023–24 (injured)	(Greece) Panathinaikos	GBL	9	17.4	.574	.000	.675	4.4	1.0	0.6	.2	9.9

== Awards & Honours ==
=== Club career ===
- Greek Cup winner (2025)
- EuroLeague champion (2024)
- Greek League champion (2024)
- ABA League champion (2023)
- EuroCup champion (2021)
- FIBA Europe Cup champion (2017)
- Serbian League champion (2018)
- French Cup winner (2017)

=== Individual awards ===
- 2× All-EuroLeague First Team (2023, 2024)
- EuroLeague Flight Time (2024)
- Greek League Finals MVP (2024)
- All-Greek League Team (2024)
- Greek League Most Spectacular Player (2024)
- EuroLeague rebounding leader (2023)
- All-ABA League Team (2023)
- ABA League Best Defender (2023)
- All-EuroCup First Team (2021)
- All-EuroCup Second Team (2019)
- LNB Pro A Sixth Man of the Year (2016)

=== France senior national team ===
- Silver Medal (2024 Paris Summer Olympics)
- Bronze Medal (2019 FIBA World Cup)

=== Honours ===
- Chevalier in the French Order of Merit (2024)
