= Aleksa Stepanović =

Serbian basketball player

Free Agent
- Position: Power forward

Personal information
- Born: 2 June 1998 (age 28) Niš, FR Yugoslavia
- Listed height: 2.07 m (6 ft 9 in)
- Listed weight: 93 kg (205 lb)

Career information
- NBA draft: 2020: undrafted
- Playing career: 2017–present

Career history
- 2015–2018: Spars Sarajevo
- 2018–2019: Dynamic Belgrade
- 2019–2020: Metalac
- 2020–2021: Sloboda Užice
- 2021: Partizan
- 2021–2024: FMP

Aleksa Stepanović (Serbian Cyrillic: Алекса Степановић; born 2 June 1998) is a Serbian professional basketball player who last played for FMP of the Adriatic League and the Basketball League of Serbia.

== Playing career ==
A power forward, Stepanović played for Spars Sarajevo, Dynamic Belgrade, Metalac, and Sloboda Užice prior he signed for Partizan in May 2021. In July 2021, he signed a three-year contract extension with Partizan. In November 2021, he parted ways with Partizan. On 16 November 2021, he signed a three-year contract with FMP.

== National team career ==
In December 2016, Stepanović was a member of the Serbian U-18 national team that finished 10th at the FIBA U18 European Championship in Samsun, Turkey. Over three tournament games, he averaged 1.3 points and 1.3 rebounds per game. In July 2017, Stepanović was a member of the Serbian U-20 national team that finished 5th at the FIBA U20 European Championship in Greece. Over five tournament games, he averaged two points, 2.2 rebounds, and 0.8 assists per game. In July 2018, he was a member of the U-20 team that finished 6th at the European Championship in Chemnitz, Germany. Over five tournament games, he averaged 3.1 points, 1.4 rebounds, and 0.4 assists per game.
