= Andrija Bojić =

Serbian basketball player

Personal information
- Born: May 28, 1993 (age 33) Belgrade, FR Yugoslavia
- Listed height: 2.08 m (6 ft 10 in)
- Listed weight: 105 kg (231 lb)

Career information
- Playing career: 2011–present
- Position: Power forward / center

Career history
- 2011–2015: Mega Vizura
- 2013–2014: → OKK Beograd
- 2015–2016: OKK Beograd
- 2016: Borac Čačak
- 2016: Mladost Zemun
- 2016–2017: Jászberényi KSE
- 2017–2018: Polpharma Starogard Gdański
- 2018: Politehnica Iași
- 2018–2019: MZT Skopje
- 2019–2020: Voluntari
- 2020–2021: MZT Skopje
- 2021–2022: Mladost MaxBet
- 2022: Kaohsiung Steelers
- 2022–2024: Spartak Office Shoes
- 2024: Sloboda Tuzla
- 2024–2025: Pelister

Career highlights
- Macedonian Cup winner (2021); 2x North Macedonia League champion (2019, 2021); Serbian First League MVP (2014)

Andrija Bojić (Serbian Cyrillic: Андрија Бојић, born May 28, 1993) is a Serbian professional basketball player, who last played as a power forward for Pelister of the Macedonian League.
