= 2021–22 P. League+ season =

2021–22 PLG season
- League: P. League+
- Sport: Basketball
- Duration: December 12, 2021 – May 28, 2022; June 3, 2022 – June 14, 2022 (playoffs); June 18, 2022 – June 27, 2022 (finals)
- Games: 30
- Teams: 6
- TV partner(s): FTV One, MOMOTV

Draft
- Top draft pick: Chu Yun-Hao
- Picked by: Hsinchu JKO Lioneers

Regular season
- Top seed: Hsinchu JKO Lioneers
- Season MVP: Yang Chin-Min (Kings)
- Top scorer: Sim Bhullar (Lioneers)

Playoffs

Finals
- Champions: Taipei Fubon Braves
- Runners-up: Hsinchu JKO Lioneers
- Finals MVP: Mike Singletary

P. League+ seasons
- ← 2020–21 2022–23 →

The 2021–22 P. League+ season was the second season of the P. League+ (PLG). The P. League+ added two new teams, New Taipei Kings and Kaohsiung Steelers, extending the number of teams to six. The regular season began on December 12, 2021, and was originally scheduled to end on May 15, 2022. The playoffs started on June 3, 2022 and ended on June 27, 2022, after the Taipei Fubon Braves clinched their second consecutive champion.

== Transactions ==
=== Retirement ===
- On March 15, 2021, Tien Lei announced his retirement from professional basketball.
- On July 8, 2021, LaDontae Henton joined Providence Friars as a special assistant to the head coach, ending his playing career.
- On September 23, 2021, Lai Kuo-Wei joined New Taipei CTBC DEA as assistant coach, ending his playing career.

=== Coaching changes ===
Coaching changes
Team	2020–21 season	2021–22 season
Off-season
Kaohsiung Steelers	—N/a	DeMarcus Berry
New Taipei Kings	—N/a	Ryan Marchand
Taoyuan Pilots	Yang I-Feng (interim)	Cheng Chih-Lung
In-season
Kaohsiung Steelers	DeMarcus Berry	Hung Chi-Chao (interim)
Taoyuan Pilots	Cheng Chih-Lung	Yen Hsing-Su (interim)
Kaohsiung Steelers	Hung Chi-Chao (interim)	Slavoljub Gorunovic (interim)

==== Off-season ====
- On June 7, 2021, the New Taipei Kings hired Ryan Marchand as their new head coach.
- On June 11, 2021, the Kaohsiung Steelers hired DeMarcus Berry as their new head coach.
- On July 12, 2021, the Taoyuan Pilots hired Cheng Chih-Lung as their new head coach.
- On September 28, 2021, Taoyuan Pilots intermin head coach Yang I-Feng was assigned to assistant coach and player development director.

==== In-season ====
- On March 19, 2022, the Kaohsiung Steelers fired head coach DeMarcus Berry and named Hung Chi-Chao as their interim head coach.
- On March 23, 2022, Cheng Chih-Lung resigned from his position as head coach of the Taoyuan Pilots after 16 games with the team. On March 25, 2022, the Pilots named Yen Hsing-Su as their interim head coach.

== Imports / foreign students / heritage players ==
Club	Imports	Foreign students	Heritage players
Formosa Taishin Dreamers	(United States) ~~Stephan Hicks~~ (United States) ~~Ricky Ledo~~ (United States) Julian Boyd (United States) Brandon Gilbeck (Serbia) Stefan Janković	—N/a	(United States) Kenneth Chien (United States) Randall Walko
Hsinchu JKO Lioneers	(United States) ~~Branden Dawson~~ (Canada) Sim Bhullar (United States) Mike Bruesewitz (United States) Nick Faust	(Macau) Iong Ngai-San	(United States) Elliot Tan
Kaohsiung Steelers	(United States) ~~Manny Harris~~; ~~(United States) Anthony Tucker~~ (Canada) Anthony Bennett (United States) Keith Benson (United States) Taylor Braun	(Saint Vincent and the Grenadines) Austin Derrick	(United States) Matthew Yang
New Taipei Kings	(United States) ~~Chris McCullough~~ (United States) DeAndre Liggins (United States) Byron Mullens (United States) Thomas Welsh	(Senegal) Omar Niang	(France) Steven Guinchard
Taipei Fubon Braves	(Malta) ~~Samuel Deguara~~ (United States) Perry Jones (United States) Mike Singletary (Ukraine) Ihor Zaytsev	(Saint Vincent and the Grenadines) Brendon Smart	(United States) Joseph Lin
Taoyuan Pilots	(United States) ~~John Gillon~~ (Serbia) Nemanja Bešović (United States) Devin Robinson (United States) Jordan Tolbert	—N/a	—N/a

Note 1: "Heritage player" refers to a player who is of Taiwanese descent but does not meet the FIBA eligibility rules to be local.

Note 2: Team can either register two heritage players, or one foreign student and one heritage player.

== Preseason ==
The preseason began on November 6, 2021, and ended on November 21.

== Regular season ==
The regular season began on December 12, 2021, and ended on May 28, 2022.

Team	GP	W	L	PCT
z − Hsinchu JKO Lioneers	30	20	10	.667
x − Formosa Taishin Dreamers	30	19	11	.633
x − Taipei Fubon Braves	30	18	12	.600
x − New Taipei Kings	30	16	14	.533
Kaohsiung Steelers	29	9	20	.310
Taoyuan Pilots	29	7	22	.241

Notes

- z – Clinched home court advantage for the entire playoffs
- x – Clinched playoff spot

=== Postponed games due to COVID-19 ===
- Three Taoyuan Pilots home games (against the New Taipei Kings on February 11, against the Hsinchu JKO Lioneers on February 19, and against the Formosa Taishin Dreamers on February 20) were postponed due to a COVID outbreak in Taoyuan City.
- The May 7 game between the Taoyuan Pilots and the Kaohsiung Steelers was postponed due to the Steelers not having the required minimum players (seven locals and one import) available.
- Two New Taipei Kings games (one home game against the Formosa Taishin Dreamers on May 6 and one road game against Taipei Fubon Braves on May 8) were postponed due to the Kings not having the required minimum players (seven locals and one import) available.
- The May 7 game between the Taipei Fubon Braves and the Hsinchu JKO Lioneers was postponed due to Lioneers staffs testing positive for COVID-19 rapid test.
- The May 8 game between the Taoyuan Pilots and the Formosa Taishin Dreamers was postponed due to Pilots players testing positive for COVID-19 rapid test.
- The May 16 game between the Taoyuan Pilots and the Kaohsiung Steelers was postponed due to the Steelers not having the required minimum players (eight) available.
- Two Formosa Taishin Dreamers road games (one game against the Taoyuan Pilots on May 17 and one game against New Taipei Kings on May 19) were postponed due to the Dreamers not having the required minimum players (eight) available.

=== Postponed games due to other reasons ===
- The February 26 game between the Formosa Taishin Dreamers and the Hsinchu JKO Lioneers was postponed due to the 2023 FIBA Basketball World Cup qualification.
- Two New Taipei Kings home games (against the Kaohsiung Steelers on February 27 and against the Hsinchu JKO Lioneers on February 28) were postponed due to the 2023 FIBA Basketball World Cup qualification.
- Two Taipei Fubon Braves home games (against the Taoyuan Pilots on February 27 and against the Formosa Taishin Dreamers on February 28) were postponed due to the 2023 FIBA Basketball World Cup qualification.

=== Cancelled games ===
- On May 29, the Taoyuan Pilots and the Kaohsiung Steelers had reached an agreement that the last game between both teams, which would affect neither the playoffs seeding nor the 2022 draft order, would not be played due to the Steelers could not reach the criteria of required minimum players (eight) before June 1.

== Playoffs ==
=== Bracket ===
Playoffs
1	**Lioneers**	3
4	Kings	2
2	Dreamers	1
3	**Braves**	3

Finals
1	Lioneers	1
3	**Braves**	4

Bold: Series winner
Italic: Team with home-court advantage

== Statistics ==
=== Individual statistic leaders ===
Category	Player	Team(s)	Statistic
Points per game	Sim Bhullar	Hsinchu JKO Lioneers	26.33
Rebounds per game	Sim Bhullar	Hsinchu JKO Lioneers	20.81
Assists per game	Lee Kai-Yan	New Taipei Kings	5.96
Steals per game	Chen Yu-Wei	Kaohsiung Steelers	2.25
Blocks per game	Brandon Gilbeck	Formosa Taishin Dreamers	3.00
2P%	Sim Bhullar	Hsinchu JKO Lioneers	67%
3P%	Ihor Zaytsev	Taipei Fubon Braves	40%
FT%	Yang Chin-Min	New Taipei Kings	84%

=== Individual game highs ===
Category	Player	Team	Statistic
Points	Sim Bhullar	Hsinchu JKO Lioneers	50
Rebounds	Sim Bhullar	Hsinchu JKO Lioneers	35
Assists	Lee Kai-Yan	New Taipei Kings	13
Assists	Jordan Tolbert	Taoyuan Pilots	13
Steals	Branden Dawson	Hsinchu JKO Lioneers	6
Steals	Lee Kai-Yan	New Taipei Kings	6
Steals	Lu Chun-Hsiang	Taoyuan Pilots	6
Steals	Devin Robinson	Taoyuan Pilots	6
Blocks	Sim Bhullar	Hsinchu JKO Lioneers	9
Turnovers	Devin Robinson	Taoyuan Pilots	10

=== Team statistic leaders ===
Category	Team	Statistic
Points per game	Taipei Fubon Braves	98.73
Rebounds per game	Hsinchu JKO Lioneers	53.47
Assists per game	Taipei Fubon Braves	21.67
Steals per game	Taoyuan Pilots	10.41
Blocks per game	Formosa Taishin Dreamers	5.07
Turnovers per game	Hsinchu JKO Lioneers	18.10
Fouls per game	Hsinchu JKO Lioneers	21.97
2P%	Taipei Fubon Braves	51.04%
3P%	Taipei Fubon Braves	32.05%
FT%	New Taipei Kings	71.70%

== Awards ==
=== Yearly awards ===
2021–22 P. League+ awards
Award	Recipient(s)	ref
Most Valuable Player	Yang Chin-Min (New Taipei Kings)	
Import of the Year	Sim Bhullar (Hsinchu JKO Lioneers)	
6th Man of the Year	Lu Chun-Hsiang (Taoyuan Pilots)	
Rookie of the Year	Chen Yu-Wei (Kaohsiung Steelers)	
Defensive Player of the Year	Thomas Welsh (New Taipei Kings)	
GM of the Year	Tsai Cherng-Ru (Taipei Fubon Braves)	
Gold Whistle Award	Chen Hung-Ming	
Coach of the Year	Lin Kuan-Lun (Hsinchu JKO Lioneers)	
Most Improved Player	Kenneth Chien (Formosa Taishin Dreamers)	
Best Home Court	Hsinchu JKO Lioneers	
Best Dressed of the Year	Chang Tsung-Hsien (Taipei Fubon Braves)	
Mr. Popular	Lin Chih-Chieh (Taipei Fubon Braves)	
PLG Cheerleader Squad of the Year	Formosa Sexy (Formosa Taishin Dreamers)	

- All-PLG First Team:
  - Yang Chin-Min, New Taipei Kings
  - Lee Kai-Yan, New Taipei Kings
  - Sim Bhullar, Hsinchu JKO Lioneers
  - Chen Yu-Wei, Kaohsiung Steelers
  - Lu Cheng-Ju, Kaohsiung Steelers
- All-PLG Second Team:
  - Lin Chih-Chieh, Taipei Fubon Braves
  - Thomas Welsh, New Taipei Kings
  - Lu Chun-Hsiang, Taoyuan Pilots
  - Kao Kuo-Hao, Hsinchu JKO Lioneers
  - Kenneth Chien, Formosa Taishin Dreamers

- All-Defensive Team:
  - Lee Kai-Yan, New Taipei Kings
  - Thomas Welsh, New Taipei Kings
  - Kao Kuo-Hao, Hsinchu JKO Lioneers
  - Kenneth Chien, Formosa Taishin Dreamers
  - Chen Yu-Wei, Kaohsiung Steelers

==== Statistical awards ====
2021–22 P. League+ statistical awards
Award	Recipient(s)	ref
Points Leader	Sim Bhullar (Hsinchu JKO Lioneers)	
Rebounds Leader	Sim Bhullar (Hsinchu JKO Lioneers)	
Assists Leader	Lee Kai-Yan (New Taipei Kings)	
Blocks Leader	Brandon Gilbeck (Formosa Taishin Dreamers)	
Steals Leader	Chen Yu-Wei (Kaohsiung Steelers)	

==== Finals ====
2022 P. League+ Finals awards
Award	Recipient(s)	ref
Champion	Taipei Fubon Braves	
Finals MVP	Mike Singletary (Taipei Fubon Braves)	

=== Players of the Week ===
==== Preseason ====
Week	Recipient	Ref
1	Kao Kuo-Hao (Hsinchu JKO Lioneers)	
2	Lu Cheng-Ju (Kaohsiung Steelers)	
3	Sim Bhullar (Hsinchu JKO Lioneers)	

==== Regular season ====
Week	Recipient	Ref
1	Mike Singletary (Taipei Fubon Braves) (1/2)	
2	Mike Singletary (Taipei Fubon Braves) (2/2)	
3	Lee Kai-Yan (New Taipei Kings) (1/1)	
4	Brendon Smart (Taipei Fubon Braves) (1/1)	
5	Lin Chih-Chieh (Taipei Fubon Braves) (1/1)	
6	Wang Po-Chih (Kaohsiung Steelers) (1/1)	
7	Lin Chun-Chi (Formosa Taishin Dreamers) (1/2)	
8	Lu Cheng-Ju (Kaohsiung Steelers) (1/1)	
9	Branden Dawson (Hsinchu JKO Lioneers) (1/1)	
10	Chang Tsung-Hsien (Taipei Fubon Braves) (1/1)	
12	Devin Robinson (Taoyuan Pilots) (1/1)	
13	Nick Faust (Hsinchu JKO Lioneers) (1/1)	
14	Lin Chun-Chi (Formosa Taishin Dreamers) (2/2)	
15	Yang Chin-Min (New Taipei Kings) (1/1)	
16	Kao Kuo-Hao (Hsinchu JKO Lioneers) (1/1)	
17	Kuo Shao-Chieh (Hsinchu JKO Lioneers) (1/1)	
18	Sim Bhullar (Hsinchu JKO Lioneers) (1/1)	
19	Douglas Creighton (Formosa Taishin Dreamers) (1/1)	
20	Chen Yu-Wei (Kaohsiung Steelers) (1/1)	

=== Players of the Month ===
Month	Recipient	Ref
December	Thomas Welsh (New Taipei Kings) (1/1)	
January	Lu Cheng-Ju (Kaohsiung Steelers) (1/1)	
February	Julian Boyd (Formosa Taishin Dreamers) (1/1)	
March	Yang Chin-Min (New Taipei Kings) (1/1)	
April	Sim Bhullar (Hsinchu JKO Lioneers) (1/1)	
May	Nick Faust (Hsinchu JKO Lioneers) (1/1)	

== Arenas ==
- The Kaohsiung Steelers announced on May 25, 2021, that they would play their home games at Fengshan Arena.
- The New Taipei Kings announced on September 4, that they would play their home games at Xinzhuang Gymnasium, and would share the same arena with New Taipei CTBC DEA of T1 League.
- Due to the renovation of Changhua County Stadium, the Formosa Taishin Dreamers announced on July 7, 2021, that they would play their home games at Intercontinental Basketball Stadium in Taichung City this season.
- The Taoyuan Pilots scheduled their first two home games at National Taiwan Sport University Arena.
- The Taoyuan Pilots relocated their last two rescheduled home games to Nanshan High School Gymnasium in New Taipei City, despite the latter one being cancelled on May 29.

== Media ==
The games were aired on television via FTV One and MOMOTV, and broadcast online on the YouTube official channel, 4gTV, and Yahoo! Sports.
