= 2022 P. League+ finals =

Team	Coach	Wins
Hsinchu JKO Lioneers	Lin Kuan-Lun	1
Taipei Fubon Braves	Hsu Chin-Che	4
- Dates: June 18–27
- MVP: Mike Singletary (Taipei Fubon Braves)

The 2022 P. League+ finals is the championship series of the P. League+'s (PLG) 2021–22 season and conclusion of the season's playoffs. The series started on June 18 and ended on June 27. The Taipei Fubon Braves won their second consecutive champion after defeating Hsinchu JKO Lioneers in five games. Mike Singletary won his second FMVP in a row.

== Background ==
=== Road to the finals ===
Team	GP	W	L	PCT
z – Hsinchu JKO Lioneers	30	20	10	.667
x – Formosa Taishin Dreamers	30	19	11	.633
x – Taipei Fubon Braves	30	18	12	.600
x – New Taipei Kings	30	16	14	.533
Kaohsiung Steelers	29	9	20	.310
Taoyuan Pilots	29	7	22	.241

Notes

- z – Clinched home court advantage for the entire playoffs
- x – Clinched playoff spot

Playoff results
Hsinchu JKO Lioneers		Taipei Fubon Braves
Defeated the 4th-seeded New Taipei Kings, 3–2	Playoffs	Defeated the 2nd-seeded Formosa Taishin Dreamers, 3–1

=== Regular season series ===
The Lioneers won the regular season series 4–2.

December 11, 2021

Boxscore

Taipei Fubon Braves 98, Hsinchu JKO Lioneers 87

Hsinchu County Stadium, Hsinchu County

December 25, 2021

Boxscore

Taipei Fubon Braves 92, Hsinchu JKO Lioneers 82

Hsinchu County Stadium, Hsinchu County

January 1, 2022

Boxscore

Hsinchu JKO Lioneers 114, Taipei Fubon Braves 106

Taipei Heping Basketball Gymnasium, Taipei City

April 3, 2022

Boxscore

Hsinchu JKO Lioneers 114, Taipei Fubon Braves 103

Taipei Heping Basketball Gymnasium, Taipei City

April 10, 2022

Boxscore

Taipei Fubon Braves 91, Hsinchu JKO Lioneers 98

Hsinchu County Stadium, Hsinchu County

May 21, 2022

Boxscore

Hsinchu JKO Lioneers 108, Taipei Fubon Braves 99

Taipei Heping Basketball Gymnasium, Taipei City

== Series summary ==
Game	Date	Away team	Result	Home team
Game 1	Saturday, June 18	Taipei Fubon Braves	101–102 (0–1)	Hsinchu JKO Lioneers
Game 2	Monday, June 20	Taipei Fubon Braves	102–81 (1–1)	Hsinchu JKO Lioneers
Game 3	Thursday, June 23	Hsinchu JKO Lioneers	101–116 (1–2)	Taipei Fubon Braves
Game 4	Saturday, June 25	Hsinchu JKO Lioneers	110–128 (1–3)	Taipei Fubon Braves
Game 5	Monday, June 27	Taipei Fubon Braves	108–104 (4–1)	Hsinchu JKO Lioneers

== Game summaries ==
=== Game 1 ===
June 18
5:00pm

Boxscore

Taipei Fubon Braves 101, Hsinchu JKO Lioneers 102
Scoring by quarter: 34–22, 33–28, 17–35, 17–17
Pts: Mike Singletary 33; Rebs: Mike Singletary 11; Asts: J. Lin, Singletary 4 each	Pts: Lee Chia-Jui 25; Rebs: Sim Bhullar 12; Asts: Lee Chia-Jui 5
Lioneers leads series, 1–0

Hsinchu County Stadium, Hsinchu County
Attendance: 7,200
Referees: Lai Jian-Zhong, Huang Chen-Feng, Yu Hao-Ping

=== Game 2 ===
June 20
7:00pm

Boxscore

Taipei Fubon Braves 102, Hsinchu JKO Lioneers 81
Scoring by quarter: 28–20, 34–21, 30–26, 10–14
Pts: Mike Singletary 33; Rebs: Mike Singletary 18; Asts: Lin Chih-Chieh 6	Pts: Sim Bhullar 22; Rebs: Sim Bhullar 11; Asts: Tien Hao 5
Series tied, 1–1

Hsinchu County Stadium, Hsinchu County
Attendance: 7,200
Referees: Chen Hung-Min, Hsieh Wen-Wei, Luo Kuo-Hsien

=== Game 3 ===
June 23
7:00pm

Boxscore

Hsinchu JKO Lioneers 101, Taipei Fubon Braves 116
Scoring by quarter: 22–26, 32–33, 28–32, 19–25
Pts: Sim Bhullar 32; Rebs: Sim Bhullar 24; Asts: Lin Ming-Yi 3	Pts: Mike Singletary 35; Rebs: Mike Singletary 11; Asts: Mike Singletary 11
Braves leads series, 2–1

Taipei Heping Basketball Gymnasium, Taipei City
Attendance: 7,000
Referees: Ng Yui-Wai, Hong Yung-Yu, Yeh Chun-Hung

=== Game 4 ===
June 25
5:00pm

Boxscore

Hsinchu JKO Lioneers 110, Taipei Fubon Braves 128
Scoring by quarter: 34–37, 31–34, 22–33, 23–24
Pts: Sim Bhullar 24; Rebs: Sim Bhullar 18; Asts: Kao Kuo-Hao 7	Pts: Jones, Singletary 24 each Rebs: Mike Singletary 17; Asts: Tseng Hsiang-Chun 7
Braves leads series, 3–1

Taipei Heping Basketball Gymnasium, Taipei City
Attendance: 7,000
Referees: Lai Jian-Zhong, Sung Ming-Lu, Mei Ming-Sheng

=== Game 5 ===
June 27
7:00pm

Boxscore

Taipei Fubon Braves 108, Hsinchu JKO Lioneers 104
Scoring by quarter: 23–31, 37–19, 28–28, 20–26
Pts: Mike Singletary 43; Rebs: Mike Singletary 13; Asts: Tseng Hsiang-Chun 6	Pts: Sim Bhullar 38; Rebs: Sim Bhullar 15; Asts: Kao Kuo-Hao 8
Braves wins series, 4–1

Hsinchu County Stadium, Hsinchu County
Attendance: 8,000
Referees: Chen Hung-Ming, Yeh Chun-Hung, Hong Yung-Yu

== Rosters ==
=== Hsinchu JKO Lioneers ===
2021–22 Hsinchu JKO Lioneers roster
Players
Coaches

Pos.	No.	Nat.	Name	Ht.	Wt.	Age	From
G	3	(Chinese Taipei)	Lin Ming-Yi	1.78 m (5 ft 10 in)	68 kg (150 lb)	30 – 27 March 1996	MingDao
G	4	(Chinese Taipei)	Kao Kuo-Hao	1.79 m (5 ft 10 in)	76 kg (168 lb)	27 – 22 September 1998	Southeast Missouri State
G	5	(Chinese Taipei)	Sung Yu-Hsuan	1.84 m (6 ft 0 in)	80 kg (176 lb)	36 – 5 December 1989	Chinese Culture
G	6	(United States) (Chinese Taipei)	Elliot Tan	1.78 m (5 ft 10 in)	78 kg (172 lb)	37 – 4 October 1988	Biola
G/F	7	(United States)	Nick Faust (I)	1.98 m (6 ft 6 in)	95 kg (209 lb)	33 – 25 February 1993	Long Beach State
F	8	(Chinese Taipei)	Chu Yun-Hao	1.94 m (6 ft 4 in)	90 kg (198 lb)	28 – 3 November 1997	Chien Hsin Tech
G	9	(Chinese Taipei)	Tien Hao	1.73 m (5 ft 8 in)	68 kg (150 lb)	27 – 16 September 1998	NCCU
F	11	(Chinese Taipei)	Hsiao Hsun-Yi	1.92 m (6 ft 4 in)	82 kg (181 lb)	33 – 23 October 1992	NTUA
F	12	(Chinese Taipei)	Lee Chia-Jui (C)	2.00 m (6 ft 7 in)	86 kg (190 lb)	31 – 4 December 1994	KLCIVS
F	24	(Chinese Taipei)	Kuo Shao-Chieh	1.90 m (6 ft 3 in)	80 kg (176 lb)	36 – 9 April 1990	TNU
F	31	(United States)	Mike Bruesewitz (I)	1.99 m (6 ft 6 in)	100 kg (220 lb)	35 – 9 August 1990	Wisconsin
C	35	(Canada)	Sim Bhullar (I)	2.26 m (7 ft 5 in)	140 kg (309 lb)	33 – 2 December 1992	New Mexico State
F	36	(Chinese Taipei)	Lin Yi-Huei	1.93 m (6 ft 4 in)	100 kg (220 lb)	40 – 24 March 1986	NTNU
C	52	(Macau)	Iong Ngai-San	2.00 m (6 ft 7 in)	108 kg (238 lb)	30 – 9 February 1996	NTNU
F	54	(Chinese Taipei)	Wu Tai-Hao	2.03 m (6 ft 8 in)	105 kg (231 lb)	41 – 7 February 1985	BYU–Hawaii

Head coach

- (Chinese Taipei) Lin Kuan-Lun

Assistant coach(es)

- (Chinese Taipei) Sheng Hsin-Han

Strength & conditioning coach(es)

- (Chinese Taipei) Huang Sheng-Fu

Athletic trainer(s)

- (Chinese Taipei) Huang Chien-Yuan
- (Chinese Taipei) Ou Po-Hung

Legend

- (C) Team captain
- (I) Import player
- Injured

=== Taipei Fubon Braves ===
2021–22 Taipei Fubon Braves roster
Players
Coaches

Pos.	No.	Nat.	Name	Ht.	Wt.	Age	From
G	0	(Chinese Taipei)	Lai Ting-En	1.76 m (5 ft 9 in)	70 kg (154 lb)	29 – 22 July 1996	Fu Jen
G	1	(United States) (Chinese Taipei)	Joseph Lin	1.82 m (6 ft 0 in)	69 kg (152 lb)	33 – 21 June 1992	Hamilton
G	2	(Chinese Taipei)	Chien Wei-Ju	1.85 m (6 ft 1 in)	80 kg (176 lb)	34 – 20 January 1992	NTNU
G	3	(Chinese Taipei)	Chang Tsung-Hsien	1.92 m (6 ft 4 in)	88 kg (194 lb)	37 – 27 December 1988	BYU–Hawaii
F	8	(Chinese Taipei)	Chou Kuei-Yu	1.93 m (6 ft 4 in)	95 kg (209 lb)	27 – 19 July 1998	NTNU
F	11	(United States)	Perry Jones (I)	2.11 m (6 ft 11 in)	107 kg (236 lb)	34 – 24 September 1991	Baylor
F	12	(Chinese Taipei)	Lin Chih-Chieh	1.92 m (6 ft 4 in)	92 kg (203 lb)	43 – 11 June 1982	Chinese Culture
F	13	(Chinese Taipei)	Lin Meng-Hsueh	1.95 m (6 ft 5 in)	88 kg (194 lb)	33 – 14 October 1992	NTSU
F	14	(Chinese Taipei)	Tsai Wen-Cheng (C)	1.90 m (6 ft 3 in)	96 kg (212 lb)	40 – 31 May 1985	NCUE
F	17	(United States)	Mike Singletary (I)	1.98 m (6 ft 6 in)	103 kg (227 lb)	37 – 19 September 1988	Texas Tech
C	21	(Chinese Taipei)	Tseng Hsiang-Chun	2.05 m (6 ft 9 in)	95 kg (209 lb)	27 – 8 August 1998	Fu Jen
F	23	(Saint Vincent and the Grenadines)	Brendon Smart	1.98 m (6 ft 6 in)	95 kg (209 lb)	30 – 5 October 1995	Chien Hsin Tech
F	29	(Chinese Taipei)	Chang Keng-Yu	1.88 m (6 ft 2 in)	85 kg (187 lb)	30 – 16 October 1995	NTUS
C	32	(Ukraine)	Ihor Zaytsev (I)	2.11 m (6 ft 11 in)	110 kg (243 lb)	37 – 11 May 1989	Ukraine
C	76	(Chinese Taipei)	Tseng Wen-Ting	2.04 m (6 ft 8 in)	97 kg (214 lb)	41 – 6 July 1984	TPEC

Head coach

- (Chinese Taipei) Hsu Chin-Che

Assistant coach(es)

- (Chinese Taipei) Wu Yung-Jen
- (Chinese Taipei) Lin Wei-Hao
- (Chinese Taipei) Chiang Chih-Cheng
- (Chinese Taipei) Wei Wei

Strength & conditioning coach(es)

- (Chinese Taipei) Jheng Wei-Syuan

Athletic trainer(s)

- (Chinese Taipei) Lin Wu-Chang
- (Chinese Taipei) Peng Yu-Ming (assistant)

Legend

- (C) Team captain
- (I) Import player
- Injured

== Player statistics ==
Legend
GP	Games played	MPG	Minutes per game	2P%	2-point field goal percentage
3P%	3-point field goal percentage	FT%	Free throw percentage	RPG	Rebounds per game
APG	Assists per game	SPG	Steals per game	BPG	Blocks per game
PPG	Points per game

Hsinchu JKO Lioneers

Player	GP	MPG	PPG	2P%	3P%	FT%	RPG	APG	SPG	BPG
Sim Bhullar	5	35:47	27.60	79.10%	0.00%	57.14%	16.00	1.40	0.00	2.60
Mike Bruesewitz	2	35:25	14.00	27.78%	14.29%	92.31%	4.50	3.50	4.00	0.50
Chu Yun-Hao	5	26:59	6.80	42.11%	23.81%	42.86%	2.60	3.00	0.80	0.00
Nick Faust	3	36:57	16.00	28.57%	29.63%	100.00%	6.33	4.33	1.33	0.33
Hsiao Shun-Yi	5	14:05	4.00	42.11%	0.00%	66.67%	1.40	0.00	0.80	0.40
Iong Ngai-San	2	04:06	2.00	33.33%	0.00%	100.00%	1.50	0.50	0.00	0.00
Kao Kuo-Hao	5	40:26	15.80	42.50%	40.00%	90.00%	5.40	4.80	1.80	0.00
Kuo Shao-Chieh	3	14:32	6.33	30.00%	44.44%	50.00%	3.33	1.00	0.33	0.00
Lee Chia-Jui	5	17:38	7.20	48.00%	18.75%	50.00%	3.20	1.80	0.20	0.40
Lin Ming-Yi	3	19:40	3.67	12.50%	27.27%	0.00%	5.00	2.67	0.67	0.00
Lin Yi-Huei	4	12:04	4.25	25.00%	20.00%	35.71%	1.00	1.25	0.50	0.00
Sung Yu-Hsuan	5	14:59	7.60	60.71%	33.33%	33.33%	1.60	0.60	0.20	0.00
Elliot Tan	2	15:30	4.50	0.00%	30.00%	0.00%	1.00	4.00	0.50	0.00
Tien Hao	2	21:46	6.00	50.00%	50.00%	0.00%	2.50	4.00	1.00	0.00
Wu Tai-Hao	5	06:58	1.00	33.33%	0.00%	75.00%	2.40	0.20	0.20	0.60

Taipei Fubon Braves

Player	GP	MPG	PPG	2P%	3P%	FT%	RPG	APG	SPG	BPG
Chang Keng-Yu	3	01:47	0.00	0.00%	0.00%	0.00%	0.00	0.00	0.00	0.00
Chang Tsung-Hsien	5	27:45	11.20	43.75%	25.00%	72.22%	1.80	2.20	2.00	0.20
Chien Wei-Ju	4	05:02	1.00	0.00%	100.00%	50.00%	0.50	0.00	0.25	0.00
Chou Kuei-Yu	5	18:11	4.60	69.23%	11.11%	40.00%	1.40	1.40	0.80	0.00
Perry Jones	3	32:32	14.00	43.75%	27.27%	100.00%	5.67	3.67	1.00	0.33
Lai Ting-En	3	13:43	4.67	50.00%	33.33%	0.00%	1.00	1.33	0.33	0.00
Lin Chih-Chieh	5	23:08	15.20	61.54%	46.88%	75.00%	5.80	3.20	0.20	0.00
Joseph Lin	5	20:11	5.80	45.45%	27.27%	0.00%	3.00	2.80	0.80	0.00
Lin Meng-Hsueh	2	02:53	0.00	0.00%	0.00%	0.00%	0.50	0.00	0.00	0.00
Mike Singletary	5	41:21	33.60	59.70%	42.86%	80.95%	14.00	5.60	2.00	0.60
Brendon Smart	3	10:08	3.67	33.33%	50.00%	0.00%	4.00	0.33	0.00	0.33
Tsai Wen-Cheng	5	19:23	10.00	50.00%	72.73%	57.14%	5.60	0.80	1.60	0.00
Tseng Hsiang-Chun	5	21:02	7.40	50.00%	50.00%	62.50%	2.60	4.00	0.80	0.40
Tseng Wen-Ting	4	23:01	5.50	33.33%	37.50%	25.00%	4.25	2.25	1.50	1.75
Ihor Zaytsev	2	26:01	5.50	33.33%	37.50%	25.00%	3.00	1.50	0.00	1.50
