= 2022 P. League+ playoffs =

Taiwanese basketball tournament

Tournament details
- Dates: June 3–27, 2022
- Season: 2021–22
- Teams: 4

Final positions
- Champions: Taipei Fubon Braves (2nd title)
- Runners-up: Hsinchu JKO Lioneers

The 2022 P. League+ playoffs was the postseason tournament of the 2021–22 P. League+ season. The playoffs was originally scheduled to begin on May 21 but was postponed until June 3 due to the conflict with the extended regular season, while four rescheduled games were remaining on May 21.

== Format ==
The top four seed qualify the playoffs. All seeds will play the best-of-five playoffs series, which is in a 2-2-1 format. The winners advance and play in the best-of-seven finals series, which is in a 2-2-1-1-1 format. The seeding is based on each team's regular season record. Home court advantage goes to the higher seed for both series.

== Playoff qualifying ==
On April 9, 2022, the New Taipei Kings became the first team to clinch a playoff spot. On May 21, the Hsinchu JKO Lioneers clinched the regular season title.

Seed	Team	Record	Clinched	
Seed	Team	Record	Playoff berth	Best record in PLG
1	Hsinchu JKO Lioneers	20–10	April 10	May 21
2	Formosa Taishin Dreamers	19–11	April 23	—
3	Taipei Fubon Braves	18–12	April 10	—
4	New Taipei Kings	16–14	April 9	—

== Bracket ==
Playoffs
1	Lioneers	3
4	Kings	2
2	Dreamers	1
3	Braves	3

Finals
1	Lioneers	1
3	Braves	4

Bold Series winner
Italic Team with home-court advantage

== Playoffs: (1) Hsinchu JKO Lioneers vs. (4) New Taipei Kings ==
June 3
5:00pm

Boxscore

New Taipei Kings 86, Hsinchu JKO Lioneers 97
Scoring by quarter: 30–22, 19–33, 13–18, 24–24
Pts: Thomas Welsh 24; Rebs: Thomas Welsh 15; Asts: Lee Kai-Yan 7	Pts: Sim Bhullar 26; Rebs: Sim Bhullar 19; Asts: Tien Hao 5
Lioneers leads series, 1–0

Hsinchu County Stadium, Hsinchu County
Attendance: 6,400
Referees: Chen Hung-Ming, Yeh Chun-Hung, Wang Li-Chang

June 5
5:00pm

Boxscore

New Taipei Kings 91, Hsinchu JKO Lioneers 99
Scoring by quarter: 27–24, 24–31, 18–21, 22–23
Pts: Mullens, Welsh 22 each Rebs: Thomas Welsh 27; Asts: Lee Kai-Yan 6	Pts: Chu Yun-Hao 24; Rebs: Sim Bhullar 23; Asts: Kao Kuo-Hao 6
Lioneers leads series, 2–0

Hsinchu County Stadium, Hsinchu County
Attendance: 6,002
Referees: Lai Jian-Zhong, Sung Ming-Lu, Yu Hao-Ping

June 9
7:00pm

Boxscore

Hsinchu JKO Lioneers 93, New Taipei Kings 111
Scoring by quarter: 20–22, 33–26, 19–37, 21–26
Pts: Sim Bhullar 22; Rebs: Sim Bhullar 13; Asts: Kao Kuo-Hao 6	Pts: Thomas Welsh 34; Rebs: Thomas Welsh 17; Asts: Yang Chin-Min 12
Lioneers leads series, 2–1

Xinzhuang Gymnasium, New Taipei City
Attendance: 4,577
Referees: Ng Yui-Wai, Hung Yung-Yu, Luo Kuo-Hsien

June 11
5:00pm

Boxscore

Hsinchu JKO Lioneers 77, New Taipei Kings 97
Scoring by quarter: 29–22, 14–25, 14–31, 20–19
Pts: Chu Yun-Hao 16; Rebs: Sim Bhullar 16; Asts: Lee Chia-Jui 4	Pts: Yang Chin-Min 32; Rebs: Byron Mullens 16; Asts: Lee Kai-Yan 9
Series tied, 2–2

Xinzhuang Gymnasium, New Taipei City
Attendance: 6,540
Referees: Hsieh Wen-Wei, Pang Yun-Han, Huang Chen-Feng

June 14
7:00pm

Boxscore

New Taipei Kings 93, Hsinchu JKO Lioneers 98
Scoring by quarter: 18–25, 32–22, 23–25, 20–26
Pts: Quincy Davis 24; Rebs: Quincy Davis 16; Asts: DeAndre Liggins 5	Pts: Sim Bhullar 29; Rebs: Sim Bhullar 23; Asts: Kao Kuo-Hao 6
Lioneers wins series, 3–2

Hsinchu County Stadium, Hsinchu County
Attendance: 6,400
Referees: Chen Hung-Ming, Hung Yung-Yu, Yeh Chun-Hung

Regular-season series
Lioneers won 4–2 in the regular-season series

December 26, 2021

Boxscore

New Taipei Kings 80, Hsinchu JKO Lioneers 101

Hsinchu County Stadium, Hsinchu County

February 13, 2022

Boxscore

New Taipei Kings 97, Hsinchu JKO Lioneers 92

Hsinchu County Stadium, Hsinchu County

March 6, 2022

Boxscore

New Taipei Kings 111, Hsinchu JKO Lioneers 96

Hsinchu County Stadium, Hsinchu County

April 17, 2022

Boxscore

Hsinchu JKO Lioneers 123, New Taipei Kings 116

Xinzhuang Gymnasium, New Taipei City

April 23, 2022

Boxscore

Hsinchu JKO Lioneers 110, New Taipei Kings 92

Xinzhuang Gymnasium, New Taipei City

May 15, 2021

Boxscore

Hsinchu JKO Lioneers 122, New Taipei Kings 113

Xinzhuang Gymnasium, New Taipei City

== Playoffs: (2) Formosa Taishin Dreamers vs. (3) Taipei Fubon Braves ==
June 4
5:00pm

Boxscore

Taipei Fubon Braves 98, Formosa Taishin Dreamers 89
Scoring by quarter: 13–25, 20–20, 31–15, 34–29
Pts: Chang Tsung-Hsien 31; Rebs: Ihor Zaytsev 15; Asts: Joseph Lin 5	Pts: Lin Chun-Chi 22; Rebs: Brandon Gilbeck 14; Asts: Chien, Lin, Lee 3 each
Braves leads series, 1–0

Intercontinental Basketball Stadium, Taichung City
Attendance: 3,000
Referees: Pang Yun-Han, Huang Chen-Feng, Mei Ming-Sheng

June 6
7:00pm

Boxscore

Taipei Fubon Braves 100, Formosa Taishin Dreamers 94
Scoring by quarter: 27–24, 23–28, 23–19, 27–23
Pts: Chang Tsung-Hsien 18; Rebs: Mike Singletary 11; Asts: Tseng Wen-Ting 7	Pts: Julian Boyd 31; Rebs: Brandon Gilbeck 21; Asts: Chien, Lin 5 each
Braves leads series, 2–0

Intercontinental Basketball Stadium, Taichung City
Attendance: 3,000
Referees: Hsieh Wen-Wei, Lin Kun-Lin, Lin Ying-Feng

June 10
7:00pm

Boxscore

Formosa Taishin Dreamers 95, Taipei Fubon Braves 80
Scoring by quarter: 27–22, 29–23, 20–18, 19–17
Pts: Douglas Creighton 23; Rebs: Brandon Gilbeck 13; Asts: Julian Boyd 5	Pts: Ihor Zaytsev 15; Rebs: Mike Singletary 15; Asts: Mike Singletary 4
Braves leads series, 2–1

Taipei Heping Basketball Gymnasium, Taipei City
Attendance: 6,616
Referees: Chen Hung-Ming, Yeh Chun-Hung, Yu Hao-Ping

June 12
5:00pm

Boxscore

Formosa Taishin Dreamers 111, Taipei Fubon Braves 119 (2OT)
Scoring by quarter: 28–22, 20–21, 19–25, 22–21, Overtime: 22–30
Pts: Brandon Gilbeck 25; Rebs: Brandon Gilbeck 15; Asts: Lin Chun-Chi 9	Pts: Mike Singletary 37; Rebs: Mike Singletary 18; Asts: Lin C., Singletary 5 each
Braves wins series, 3–1

Taipei Heping Basketball Gymnasium, Taipei City
Attendance: 5,962
Referees: Lai Jian-Zhong, Ng Yui-Wai, Sung Ming-Lu

Regular-season series
Dreamers won 4–2 in the regular-season series

December 4, 2021

Boxscore

Formosa Taishin Dreamers 111, Taipei Fubon Braves 108

Taipei Heping Basketball Gymnasium, Taipei City

January 7, 2022

Boxscore

Taipei Fubon Braves 80, Formosa Taishin Dreamers 86

Intercontinental Basketball Stadium, Taichung City

February 12, 2022

Boxscore

Taipei Fubon Braves 83, Formosa Taishin Dreamers 68

Intercontinental Basketball Stadium, Taichung City

March 12, 2022

Boxscore

Formosa Taishin Dreamers 101, Taipei Fubon Braves 121

Taipei Heping Basketball Gymnasium, Taipei City

April 23, 2022

Boxscore

Taipei Fubon Braves 87, Formosa Taishin Dreamers 124

Intercontinental Basketball Stadium, Taichung City

May 15, 2021

Boxscore

Formosa Taishin Dreamers 104, Taipei Fubon Braves 100

Taipei Heping Basketball Gymnasium, Taipei City

== P. League+ finals: (1) Hsinchu JKO Lioneers vs. (3) Taipei Fubon Braves ==
June 18
5:00pm

Boxscore

Taipei Fubon Braves 101, Hsinchu JKO Lioneers 102
Scoring by quarter: 34–22, 33–28, 17–35, 17–17
Pts: Mike Singletary 33; Rebs: Mike Singletary 11; Asts: J. Lin, Singletary 4 each	Pts: Lee Chia-Jui 25; Rebs: Sim Bhullar 12; Asts: Lee Chia-Jui 5
Lioneers leads series, 1–0

Hsinchu County Stadium, Hsinchu County
Attendance: 7,200
Referees: Lai Jian-Zhong, Huang Chen-Feng, Yu Hao-Ping

June 20
7:00pm

Boxscore

Taipei Fubon Braves 102, Hsinchu JKO Lioneers 81
Scoring by quarter: 28–20, 34–21, 30–26, 10–14
Pts: Mike Singletary 33; Rebs: Mike Singletary 18; Asts: Lin Chih-Chieh 6	Pts: Sim Bhullar 22; Rebs: Sim Bhullar 11; Asts: Tien Hao 5
Series tied, 1–1

Hsinchu County Stadium, Hsinchu County
Attendance: 7,200
Referees: Chen Hung-Min, Hsieh Wen-Wei, Luo Kuo-Hsien

June 23
7:00pm

Boxscore

Hsinchu JKO Lioneers 101, Taipei Fubon Braves 116
Scoring by quarter: 22–26, 32–33, 28–32, 19–25
Pts: Sim Bhullar 32; Rebs: Sim Bhullar 24; Asts: Lin Ming-Yi 3	Pts: Mike Singletary 35; Rebs: Mike Singletary 11; Asts: Mike Singletary 11
Braves leads series, 2–1

Taipei Heping Basketball Gymnasium, Taipei City
Attendance: 7,000
Referees: Ng Yui-Wai, Hong Yung-Yu, Yeh Chun-Hung

June 25
5:00pm

Boxscore

Hsinchu JKO Lioneers 110, Taipei Fubon Braves 128
Scoring by quarter: 34–37, 31–34, 22–33, 23–24
Pts: Sim Bhullar 24; Rebs: Sim Bhullar 18; Asts: Kao Kuo-Hao 7	Pts: Jones, Singletary 24 each Rebs: Mike Singletary 17; Asts: Tseng Hsiang-Chun 7
Braves leads series, 3–1

Taipei Heping Basketball Gymnasium, Taipei City
Attendance: 7,000
Referees: Lai Jian-Zhong, Sung Ming-Lu, Mei Ming-Sheng

June 27
7:00pm

Boxscore

Taipei Fubon Braves 108, Hsinchu JKO Lioneers 104
Scoring by quarter: 23–31, 37–19, 28–28, 20–26
Pts: Mike Singletary 43; Rebs: Mike Singletary 13; Asts: Tseng Hsiang-Chun 6	Pts: Sim Bhullar 38; Rebs: Sim Bhullar 15; Asts: Kao Kuo-Hao 8
Braves wins series, 4–1

Hsinchu County Stadium, Hsinchu County
Attendance: 8,000
Referees: Chen Hung-Ming, Yeh Chun-Hung, Hong Yung-Yu

Regular-season series
Lioneers won 4–2 in the regular-season series

December 11, 2021

Boxscore

Taipei Fubon Braves 98, Hsinchu JKO Lioneers 87

Hsinchu County Stadium, Hsinchu County

December 25, 2021

Boxscore

Taipei Fubon Braves 92, Hsinchu JKO Lioneers 82

Hsinchu County Stadium, Hsinchu County

January 1, 2022

Boxscore

Hsinchu JKO Lioneers 114, Taipei Fubon Braves 106

Taipei Heping Basketball Gymnasium, Taipei City

April 3, 2022

Boxscore

Hsinchu JKO Lioneers 114, Taipei Fubon Braves 103

Taipei Heping Basketball Gymnasium, Taipei City

April 10, 2022

Boxscore

Taipei Fubon Braves 91, Hsinchu JKO Lioneers 98

Hsinchu County Stadium, Hsinchu County

May 21, 2022

Boxscore

Hsinchu JKO Lioneers 108, Taipei Fubon Braves 99

Taipei Heping Basketball Gymnasium, Taipei City
