= P. League+ cheerleading =

Professional basketball league in Taiwan

The P. League+ (PLG) is a professional basketball league in Taiwan. All teams have a squad of dancers for cheerleading. In 2021–22 season, P. League+ had added more fan-voting annual awards, including PLG Cheerleader Squad of the Year, which is awarded to the cheerleading squad with the highest fan votes for each season.

== Current squads ==
Name	Team	Seasons	Ref.
Fubon Angels	Taipei Fubon Braves	2020–present	
Pilots Crew	Taoyuan Pauian Pilots	2021–present	
Wing Stars	Tainan TSG GhostHawks	2024–present	
YoungKey Girls	Yankey Ark	2025–present	

== Former squads ==
Name	Team	Seasons	Ref.
Formosa Sexy	Formosa Dreamers	2020–2024	
Muse Girls	Hsinchu Toplus Lioneers	2020–2024	
Rakuten Girls	Taoyuan Pilots	2020–2021	
Queens	New Taipei Kings	2021–2024	
Athena Girls	Kaohsiung 17LIVE Steelers	2021–2025	

== PLG cheerleader awards ==
=== PLG Cheerleader Squad of the Year ===
Year	Squad	Team	Ref.
2022	Formosa Sexy	Formosa Taishin Dreamers	
2023	Fubon Angels	Taipei Fubon Braves	
2024	Fubon Angels	Taipei Fubon Braves	

=== PLG Cheerleader Ms. Popular ===
Year	Name	Squad	Team	Ref.
2024	Chloe	Formosa Sexy	Formosa Dreamers	

=== PLG Cheerleader Rookie of the Year ===
Year	Name	Squad	Team	Ref.
2024	Lee Ho-Zeong	Fubon Angels	Taipei Fubon Braves	
