= 2021–22 Taoyuan Pilots season =

Taiwanese professional basketball season

Taoyuan Pilots
2021-22 season
- President: Li Chung-Shu
- General Manager: Chen Hsin-An
- Head Coach: Cheng Chih-Lung (resigned); Yen Hsin-Su (interim)
- Arena: Taoyuan Arena; NTSU Multipurpose Gymnasium; Nanshan High School Gymnasium
- P. League+: 7-22(.241)
- Scoring leader: Devin Robinson(24.61)
- Rebounding leader: Devin Robinson(12.48)
- Assists leader: Wu Chia-Chun(3.86)
- Highest home attendance: 4,168 (December 19, 2021)
- Lowest home attendance: 0 (May 27, 2022)
- Average home attendance: 2,339
- Biggest win: Pilots 88-70 Steelers (December 26, 2021)
- Biggest defeat: Pilots 77-111 Dreamers (April 3, 2022); Pilots 76-110 Dreamers (May 27, 2022)
- All statistics correct as of May 29, 2022.

The 2021–22 Taoyuan Pilots season was the franchise's 2nd season, its second season in the P. LEAGUE+ (PLG), its 2nd in Taoyuan City. The Pilots were coached by Cheng Chih-Lung in his first year as head coach.

On March 23, the Pilots announced that Cheng Chih-Lung resigned as head coach. On March 25, the Pilots named Yen Hsing-Su as their interim head coach.

== Draft ==
The Pilots' 2021 first-round draft pick was traded to New Taipei Kings in exchange for 2022 first-round draft pick. However, the Pilots doesn't select any player on 2021 P. League+ draft.

== Standings ==
Team	GP	W	L	PCT
z − Hsinchu JKO Lioneers	30	20	10	.667
x − Formosa Taishin Dreamers	30	19	11	.633
x − Taipei Fubon Braves	30	18	12	.600
x − New Taipei Kings	30	16	14	.533
Kaohsiung Steelers	29	9	20	.310
Taoyuan Pilots	29	7	22	.241

== Roster ==
Note: Flags indicate national team eligibility at FIBA-sanctioned events. Players may hold other non-FIBA nationalities not displayed.

2021–22 Taoyuan Pilots roster
Players
Coaches

Pos.	No.	Nat.	Name	Ht.	Wt.	DOB (YYYY-MM-DD)	From
F	0	(United States)	Devin Robinson (I)	2.03 m (6 ft 8 in)	91 kg (201 lb)	30 – 7 March 1995	Florida
F	1	(United States)	Jordan Tolbert (I)	2.00 m (6 ft 7 in)	102 kg (225 lb)	32 – 8 November 1992	SMU
G	3	(Chinese Taipei)	Wu Chia-Chun	1.74 m (5 ft 9 in)	68 kg (150 lb)	31 – 3 March 1994	NTSU
F	5	(Chinese Taipei)	Shih Yen-Tsung	1.92 m (6 ft 4 in)	91 kg (201 lb)	33 – 29 May 1992	I-Shou
G	6	(Chinese Taipei)	Kuan Ta-You	1.81 m (5 ft 11 in)	89 kg (196 lb)	28 – 15 September 1997	NTSU
F	7	(Chinese Taipei)	Lin Yao-Tsung	1.94 m (6 ft 4 in)	100 kg (220 lb)	35 – 7 September 1990	MingDao
F	9	(Chinese Taipei)	Lin Chin-Pang	1.90 m (6 ft 3 in)	90 kg (198 lb)	40 – 15 June 1985	NTCPE
G	10	(Chinese Taipei)	Su Chih-Cheng	1.78 m (5 ft 10 in)	88 kg (194 lb)	26 – 15 April 1999	NTSU
G	12	(Chinese Taipei)	Li Chia-Kang	1.85 m (6 ft 1 in)	85 kg (187 lb)	27 – 16 October 1998	NTSU
G	13	(Chinese Taipei)	Chen Yu-Jui	1.85 m (6 ft 1 in)	75 kg (165 lb)	29 – 22 December 1995	NTSU
C	18	(Serbia)	Nemanja Besovic (I)	2.21 m (7 ft 3 in)	120 kg (265 lb)	33 – 8 June 1992	Serbia
F	22	(Chinese Taipei)	Huang Hung-Han	1.92 m (6 ft 4 in)	92 kg (203 lb)	31 – 15 October 1994	Chien Hsin Tech
C	25	(Chinese Taipei)	Lin Cheng	2.02 m (6 ft 8 in)	102 kg (225 lb)	25 – 25 July 2000	NTSU
F	28	(Chinese Taipei)	Shih Chin-Yao	1.88 m (6 ft 2 in)	86 kg (190 lb)	35 – 28 October 1990	Chinese Culture
C	30	(Chinese Taipei)	Chen Kuan-Chuan (C)	1.97 m (6 ft 6 in)	115 kg (254 lb)	31 – 30 December 1993	NTSU
F	45	(Chinese Taipei)	Wen Li-Huang	2.00 m (6 ft 7 in)	97 kg (214 lb)	32 – 26 October 1993	I-Shou
G	69	(Chinese Taipei)	Lu Chun-Hsiang	1.90 m (6 ft 3 in)	82 kg (181 lb)	28 – 15 July 1997	Fu Jen

Head coach

- (Chinese Taipei) Yen Hsing-Su (interim)

Assistant coach(es)

- (Chinese Taipei) Yang I-Feng
- (Chinese Taipei) Yen Hsing-Su
- (Chinese Taipei) Ko Huan-Wei

Strength & conditioning coach(es)

- (Chinese Taipei) Liu Cheng-Yu
- (Chinese Taipei) Huang Yu-Chih (assistant)

Athletic trainer(s)

- (Chinese Taipei) Peng Li-Chen
- (Chinese Taipei) Fan Hsiang-Yu

Legend

- (C) Team captain
- (I) Import player
- Injured

- Roster
Updated: 28 March 2022

== Game log ==
=== Preseason ===
2021 preseason game log Total: 1-2 (Home: 0–1; Road: 1–1)
Game	Date	Team	Score	High points	High rebounds	High assists	Location Attendance	Record
1	November 7	@Hsinchu JKO Lioneers	W 97-82	Shih Chin-Yao (27)	Wu Chia-Chun (8); Huang Hung-Han (8)	Wu Chia-Chun (5)	Xinzhuang Gymnasium; 5,977	1-0
2	November 14	@Formosa Taishin Dreamers	L 88-90	Lu Chun-Hsiang (25)	Huang Hung-Han (12)	Huang Hung-Han (10)	Fengshan Arena; 4,866	1-1
3	November 21	Taipei Fubon Braves	L 74-89	Shih Chin-Yao (20)	Shih Yen-Tsung (7)	Li Chia-Kang (5)	National Taiwan University Sports Center; 3,087	1-2

=== Regular season ===
2021–22 regular season game log Total: 7-22 (Home: 2–12; Road: 5–10)
Game	Date	Team	Score	High points	High rebounds	High assists	Location Attendance	Record
1	December 12	@Formosa Taishin Dreamers	L 92-95(OT)	John Gillon (28)	Jordan Tolbert (22)	Shih Chin-Yao (4)	Intercontinental Basketball Stadium; 3,000	0-1
2	December 18	Kaohsiung Steelers	L 64-84	John Gillon (21)	Jordan Tolbert (13)	Wu Chia-Chun (3); John Gillon (3)	National Taiwan Sport University Arena; 3,288	0-2
3	December 19	Hsinchu JKO Lioneers	L 83-95	Chen Kuan-Chuan (20)	Devin Robinson (19)	John Gillon (6)	National Taiwan Sport University Arena; 4,168	0-3
4	December 24	@New Taipei Kings	W 109-94	Devin Robinson (28)	Devin Robinson (18)	Jordan Tolbert (13)	Xinzhuang Gymnasium; 5,516	1-3
5	December 26	@Kaohsiung Steelers	W 88-70	Devin Robinson (26)	Jordan Tolbert (17)	Jordan Tolbert (3)	Fengshan Arena; 3,229	2-3
6	January 8	@New Taipei Kings	L 90-101	Devin Robinson (29)	Jordan Tolbert (13)	Wu Chia-Chun (6)	Xinzhuang Gymnasium; 5,061	2-4
7	January 14	@Kaohsiung Steelers	W 101-94	Jordan Tolbert (24)	Devin Robinson (19)	Jordan Tolbert (6)	Fengshan Arena; 3,011	3-4
8	January 16	@Taipei Fubon Braves	L 84-103	Devin Robinson (40)	Devin Robinson (13)	Wu Chia-Chun (6)	Taipei Heping Basketball Gymnasium; 6,066	3-5
9	January 23	@Hsinchu JKO Lioneers	L 65-91	Kuan Ta-You (19)	Devin Robinson (10)	Kuan Ta-You (3); Lin Yao-Tsung (3); Li Chia-Kang (3)	Hsinchu County Stadium; 4,012	3-6
PPD	February 11	New Taipei Kings	Postponed					
10	February 12	@Hsinchu JKO Lioneers	L 80-101	Kuan Ta-You (17); Shih Chin-Yao (17)	Jordan Tolbert (12)	Wu Chia-Chun (9)	Hsinchu County Stadium; 4,317	3-7
PPD	February 19	Hsinchu JKO Lioneers	Postponed					
PPD	February 20	Formosa Taishin Dreamers	Postponed					
PPD	February 27	@Taipei Fubon Braves	Postponed					
11	March 5	Formosa Taishin Dreamers	W 81-77	Devin Robinson (22)	Devin Robinson (12); Jordan Tolbert (12)	Chen Kuan-Chuan (6)	Taoyuan Arena; 2,058	4-7
12	March 6	Taipei Fubon Braves	L 79-99	Devin Robinson (22); Jordan Tolbert (22)	Devin Robinson (15)	Wu Chia-Chun (3); Kuan Ta-You (3); Shih Chin-Yao (3)	Taoyuan Arena; 2,471	4-8
13	March 8	New Taipei Kings	W 97-95	Devin Robinson (36)	Devin Robinson (13); Jordan Tolbert (13)	Jordan Tolbert (4); Kuan Ta-You (4)	Taoyuan Arena; 2,569	5-8
14	March 13	@Taipei Fubon Braves	L 82-91	Devin Robinson (26)	Devin Robinson (14)	Kuan Ta-You (5)	Taipei Heping Basketball Gymnasium; 5,262	5-9
15	March 19	New Taipei Kings	L 92-102	Devin Robinson (27)	Devin Robinson (17)	Devin Robinson (5); Wu Chia-Chun (5)	Taoyuan Arena; 2,511	5-10
16	March 20	Taipei Fubon Braves	L 85-95	Lu Chun-Hsiang (28)	Devin Robinson (11)	Devin Robinson (7)	Taoyuan Arena; 2,106	5-11
17	March 25	@Hsinchu JKO Lioneers	W 97-89	Jordan Tolbert (25)	Jordan Tolbert (16)	Wu Chia-Chun (3); Shih Chin-Yao (3)	Hsinchu County Stadium; 5,004	6-11
18	March 27	@New Taipei Kings	L 104-111	Devin Robinson (26)	Devin Robinson (8)	Kuan Ta-You (7)	Xinzhuang Gymnasium; 3,171	6-12
19	April 1	Hsinchu JKO Lioneers	L 97-116	Nemanja Bešović (27)	Devin Robinson (8)	Devin Robinson (4); Wu Chia-Chun (4)	Taoyuan Arena; 2,780	6-13
20	April 3	@Formosa Taishin Dreamers	L 77-111	Shih Chin-Yao (22)	Jordan Tolbert (12)	Jordan Tolbert (6)	Intercontinental Basketball Stadium; 3,000	6-14
21	April 9	New Taipei Kings	L 85-95	Jordan Tolbert (24); Nemanja Bešović (24)	Jordan Tolbert (14)	Jordan Tolbert (3)	Taoyuan Arena; 2,791	6-15
22	April 10	Kaohsiung Steelers	L 102-107	Devin Robinson (37)	Devin Robinson (16)	Wu Chia-Chun (8)	Taoyuan Arena; 1,936	6-16
23	April 12	Formosa Taishin Dreamers	L 87-92	Devin Robinson (33)	Devin Robinson (14)	Wu Chia-Chun (7)	Taoyuan Arena; 2,182	6-17
24	April 16	@Kaohsiung Steelers	W 106-104(OT)	Devin Robinson (23)	Devin Robinson (14)	Jordan Tolbert (4); Shih Chin-Yao (4)	Fengshan Arena; 2,137	7-17
25	April 24	@Formosa Taishin Dreamers	L 97-104	Devin Robinson (28)	Devin Robinson (11)	Shih Chin-Yao (5)	Intercontinental Basketball Stadium; 3,000	7-18
26	April 30	Taipei Fubon Braves	L 80-86	Lu Chun-Hsiang (28)	Devin Robinson (7); Lin Cheng (7)	Wu Chia-Chun (6)	Taoyuan Arena; 1,728	7-19
27	May 1	Hsinchu JKO Lioneers	L 86-94	Lu Chun-Hsiang (24)	Huang Hung-Han (9)	Wu Chia-Chun (6); Chen Kuan-Chuan (6)	Taoyuan Arena; 2,159	7-20
PPD	May 7	Kaohsiung Steelers	Postponed					
PPD	May 8	Formosa Taishin Dreamers	Postponed					
28	May 14	@Taipei Fubon Braves	L 97-98	Devin Robinson (24)	Jordan Tolbert (15)	Jordan Tolbert (6)	Taipei Heping Basketball Gymnasium; 4,535	7-21
PPD	May 16	Kaohsiung Steelers	Postponed					
PPD	May 17	Formosa Taishin Dreamers	Postponed					
29	May 27	Formosa Taishin Dreamers	L 76-110	Lin Cheng (25); Lu Chun-Hsiang (25)	Huang Hung-Han (10); Lin Cheng(10)	Wu Chia-Chin (5); Huang Hung-Han (5)	Nanshan High School Gymnasium; 0	7-22

== Player statistics ==
Legend
GP	Games played	MPG	Minutes per game	2P%	2-point field goal percentage
3P%	3-point field goal percentage	FT%	Free throw percentage	RPG	Rebounds per game
APG	Assists per game	SPG	Steals per game	BPG	Blocks per game
PPG	Points per game		Led the league

=== Regular season ===
Player	GP	MPG	PPG	2P%	3P%	FT%	RPG	APG	SPG	BPG
Devin Robinson	23	33:03	24.61	52.52%	30.34%	76.07%	12.48	2.70	2.04	1.26
Jordan Tolbert	21	36:40	17.90	54.84%	28.77%	66.13%	11.81	3.52	2.00	0.90
Wu Chia-Chun	29	32:36	7.59	46.15%	28.42%	81.58%	2.79	3.86	0.76	0.03
John Gillon	3	35:04	22.67	37.50%	31.58%	86.96%	5.00	4.00	2.33	0.00
Shih Yen-Tsung	14	17:33	3.86	31.43%	37.50%	56.00%	3.79	1.00	0.86	0.07
Kuan Ta-You	22	20:49	6.05	37.33%	31.15%	66.67%	2.50	2.41	1.41	0.32
Lin Yao-Tsung	16	09:52	1.56	33.33%	0.00%	37.50%	1.81	0.88	0.13	0.38
Lin Chin-Pang	1	19:56	5.00	33.33%	33.33%	0.00%	0.00	2.00	1.00	1.00
Su Chih-Cheng	1	03:58	0.00	0.00%	0.00%	0.00%	0.00	1.00	0.00	0.00
Li Chia-Kang	19	14:23	3.47	40.91%	24.14%	47.37%	1.00	0.84	0.53	0.11
Chen Yu-Jui	19	22:29	5.74	48.94%	29.79%	58.33%	3.95	1.26	1.16	0.00
Nemanja Besovic	6	24:17	12.83	52.83%	25.00%	85.71%	7.00	0.17	1.00	0.17
Huang Hung-Han	10	18:15	3.20	36.36%	26.67%	50.00%	4.50	1.40	0.60	0.10
Lin Cheng	11	17:42	4.91	50.00%	50.00%	88.89%	4.45	1.00	0.36	0.18
Shih Chin-Yao	29	32:41	10.66	46.24%	23.56%	65.00%	2.97	1.93	1.07	0.24
Chen Kuan-Chuan	26	22:34	4.85	31.90%	25.00%	50.00%	4.12	1.81	0.77	0.31
Wen Li-Huang	18	07:12	0.89	20.00%	0.00%	50.00%	1.11	0.33	0.11	0.11
Lu Chun-Hsiang	22	29:43	14.86	42.18%	35.63%	82.05%	4.41	1.55	1.68	0.23

- Reference：

== Transactions ==
=== Trades ===
October 21, 2021
To Taoyuan Pilots

- 2023 first-round pick
To Kaohsiung Steelers

- Peng Chun-Yen

=== Free Agency ===
==== Re-signed ====
Date	Player	Contract terms	Ref.
July 5, 2021	Shih Chin-Yao	3-year contract, worth unknown	
July 14, 2021	Lin Yao-Tsung	—	
July 14, 2021	Chen Kuan-Chuan	—	

==== Additions ====
Date	Player	Contract terms	Former team	Ref.
June 30, 2021	Huang Hung-Han	—	Taiwan Beer	
July 9, 2021	Chen Yu-Jui	—	Bank of Taiwan	
July 21, 2021	Jordan Tolbert	—	Yulon Luxgen Dinos	
August 25, 2021	Wu Chia-Chun	—	Taoyuan Pauian Archiland	
August 25, 2021	Lu Chun-Hsiang	—	Taoyuan Pauian Archiland	
August 25, 2021	Shih Yen-Tsung	—	Taoyuan Pauian Archiland	
August 25, 2021	Li Chia-Kang	—	Taoyuan Pauian Archiland	
August 25, 2021	Wen Li-Huang	—	Taoyuan Pauian Archiland	
September 28, 2021	Su Chih-Cheng	—	NTSU	
November 9, 2021	John Gillon	—	(Hungary) Alba Fehérvár	
November 10, 2021	Devin Robinson	—	(United States) Fort Wayne Mad Ants	
March 10, 2022	Nemanja Bešović	—	(Bulgaria) Academic Plovdiv	
March 28, 2022	Lin Chin-Pang	—	Taoyuan Pauian Archiland	

==== Subtractions ====
Date	Player	Reason	New Team	Ref.
April 22, 2021	Kadeem Jack	contract expired	(Puerto Rico) Cangrejeros de Santurce	
April 22, 2021	Davon Reed	contract expired	(United States) Denver Nuggets	
June 30, 2021	Ting Sheng-Ju	contract expired	Taichung Wagor Suns	
June 30, 2021	Sun Szu-Yao	contract expired	Taichung Wagor Suns	
June 30, 2021	Lai Kuo-Wei	contract expired	New Taipei CTBC DEA	
June 30, 2021	Chang Keng-Yu	contract expired	Taipei Fubon Braves	
July 8, 2021	Quincy Davis	contract expired	New Taipei Kings	
July 30, 2021	Chen Ching-Huan	waived	Taichung Wagor Suns	
November 29, 2021	Jordan Chatman	contract expired	Tainan TSG GhostHawks	
November 30, 2021	Chen Shih-Chieh	contract expired	Taoyuan Pauian Archiland	
January 4, 2022	John Gillon	contract expired	Taoyuan Leopards	

== Awards ==
=== End-of-Season Awards ===
Recipient	Award	Ref.
Lu Chun-Hsiang	6th Man of the Year	
Lu Chun-Hsiang	All-PLG 2nd Team	

=== Players of the Week ===
Week	Recipient	Date awarded	Ref.
Week 12	Devin Robinson	March 5 - March 8	
