= 2021–22 Taipei Fubon Braves season =

Taiwanese professional basketball season

Taipei Fubon Braves
2021–22 season
- President: Tsai Cherng-Ru
- General Manager: Tsai Cherng-Ru
- Head Coach: Hsu Chin-Che
- Arena: Taipei Heping Basketball Gymnasium
- P. League+: 18-12(.600)
- Playoffs: P. League+ Champions (Defeated Lioneers 4-1)
- Scoring leader: Mike Singletary(21.86)
- Rebounding leader: Mike Singletary(11.77)
- Assists leader: Mike Singletary(4.59)
- Highest home attendance: 6,981 (January 1, 2022)
- Lowest home attendance: 4,535 (May 14, 2022)
- Average home attendance: 5,901
- Biggest win: Braves 107-82 Steelers (December 5, 2021)
- Biggest defeat: Braves 87-124 Dreamers (April 23, 2022)
- All statistics correct as of June 28, 2022.

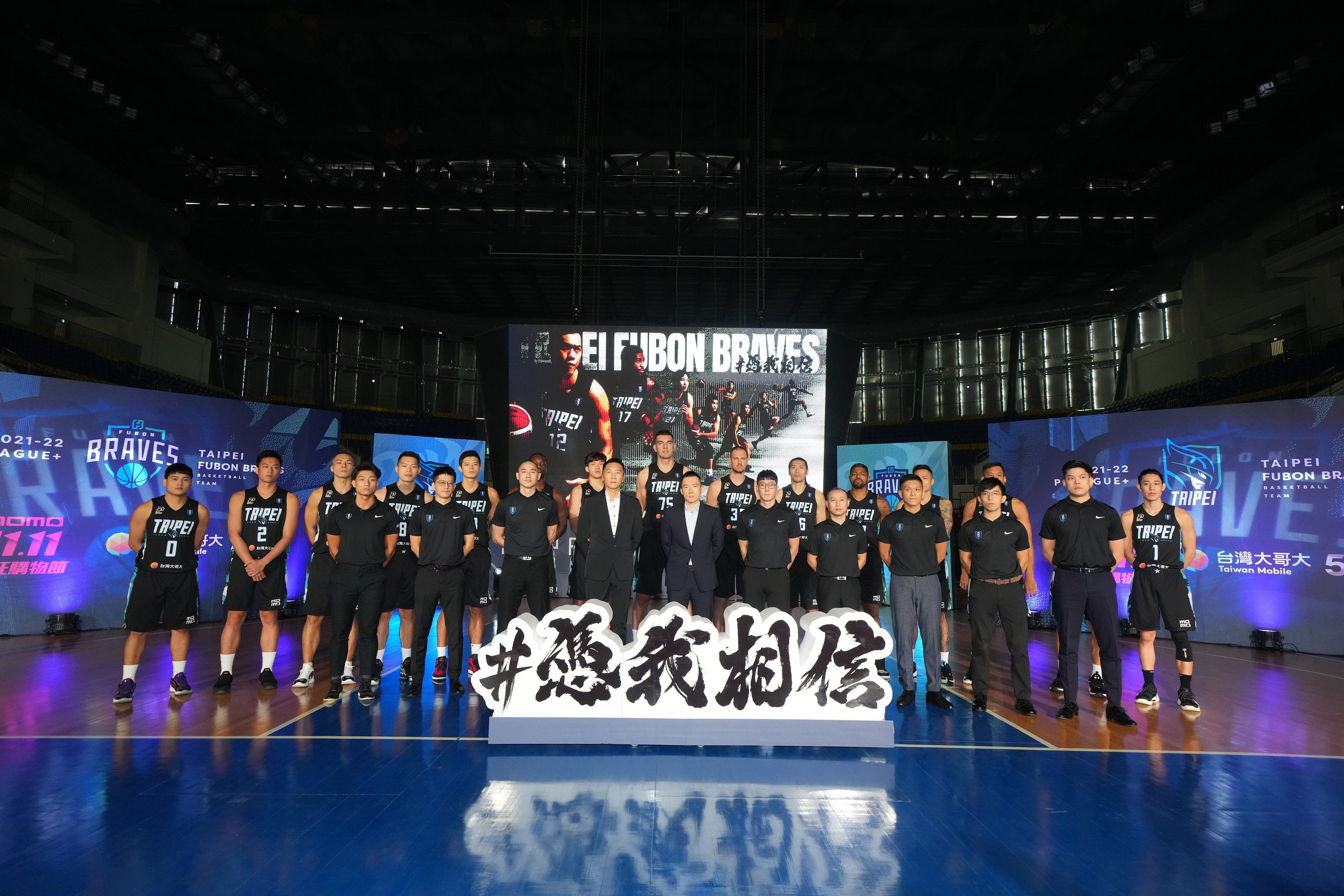

The 2021–22 Taipei Fubon Braves season was the franchise's 24th league season, the franchise's second season in the P. LEAGUE+ (PLG), its 3rd in Taipei City. The Braves are coached by Hsu Chin-Che in his fifth year as head coach.

== Draft ==
Round	Pick	Player	Position	Status	School/club team
1	6	Wang Lu-Hsiang	G	Local	CCUT

On October 27, 2021, the first rounder, Wang Lu-Hsiang was traded to Kaohsiung Steelers in exchange for 2022 first-round draft pick.

== Standings ==
Team	GP	W	L	PCT
z − Hsinchu JKO Lioneers	30	20	10	.667
x − Formosa Taishin Dreamers	30	19	11	.633
x − Taipei Fubon Braves	30	18	12	.600
x − New Taipei Kings	30	16	14	.533
Kaohsiung Steelers	29	9	20	.310
Taoyuan Pilots	29	7	22	.241

== Roster ==
Note: Flags indicate national team eligibility at FIBA-sanctioned events. Players may hold other non-FIBA nationalities not displayed.

2021–22 Taipei Fubon Braves roster
Players
Coaches

Pos.	No.	Nat.	Name	Ht.	Wt.	Age	From
G	0	(Chinese Taipei)	Lai Ting-En	1.76 m (5 ft 9 in)	70 kg (154 lb)	29 – 22 July 1996	Fu Jen
G	1	(United States) (Chinese Taipei)	Joseph Lin	1.82 m (6 ft 0 in)	69 kg (152 lb)	33 – 21 June 1992	Hamilton
G	2	(Chinese Taipei)	Chien Wei-Ju	1.85 m (6 ft 1 in)	80 kg (176 lb)	33 – 20 January 1992	NTNU
G	3	(Chinese Taipei)	Chang Tsung-Hsien	1.92 m (6 ft 4 in)	88 kg (194 lb)	36 – 27 December 1988	BYU–Hawaii
F	8	(Chinese Taipei)	Chou Kuei-Yu	1.93 m (6 ft 4 in)	95 kg (209 lb)	27 – 19 July 1998	NTNU
F	11	(United States)	Perry Jones (I)	2.11 m (6 ft 11 in)	107 kg (236 lb)	34 – 24 September 1991	Baylor
F	12	(Chinese Taipei)	Lin Chih-Chieh	1.92 m (6 ft 4 in)	92 kg (203 lb)	43 – 11 June 1982	Chinese Culture
F	13	(Chinese Taipei)	Lin Meng-Hsueh	1.95 m (6 ft 5 in)	88 kg (194 lb)	33 – 14 October 1992	NTSU
F	14	(Chinese Taipei)	Tsai Wen-Cheng (C)	1.90 m (6 ft 3 in)	96 kg (212 lb)	40 – 31 May 1985	NCUE
F	17	(United States)	Mike Singletary (I)	1.98 m (6 ft 6 in)	103 kg (227 lb)	37 – 19 September 1988	Texas Tech
C	21	(Chinese Taipei)	Tseng Hsiang-Chun	2.05 m (6 ft 9 in)	95 kg (209 lb)	27 – 8 August 1998	Fu Jen
F	23	(Saint Vincent and the Grenadines)	Brendon Smart	1.98 m (6 ft 6 in)	95 kg (209 lb)	30 – 5 October 1995	Chien Hsin Tech
F	29	(Chinese Taipei)	Chang Keng-Yu	1.88 m (6 ft 2 in)	85 kg (187 lb)	30 – 16 October 1995	NTUS
C	32	(Ukraine)	Ihor Zaytsev (I)	2.11 m (6 ft 11 in)	110 kg (243 lb)	36 – 11 May 1989	Ukraine
C	76	(Chinese Taipei)	Tseng Wen-Ting	2.04 m (6 ft 8 in)	97 kg (214 lb)	41 – 6 July 1984	TPEC

Head coach

- (Chinese Taipei) Hsu Chin-Che

Assistant coach(es)

- (Chinese Taipei) Wu Yung-Jen
- (Chinese Taipei) Lin Wei-Hao
- (Chinese Taipei) Chiang Chih-Chen
- (Chinese Taipei) Wei Wei

Strength & conditioning coach(es)

- (Chinese Taipei) Jheng Wei-Syuan

Athletic trainer(s)

- (Chinese Taipei) Lin Wu-Chang
- (Chinese Taipei) Peng Yu-Ming (assistant)

Legend

- (C) Team captain
- (I) Import player
- Injured

- Roster
Updated: 21 March 2022

== Game log ==
=== Preseason ===
2021 preseason game log Total: 3-1 (Home: 1–0; Road: 2–1)
Game	Date	Team	Score	High points	High rebounds	High assists	Location Attendance	Record
1	November 7	@New Taipei Kings	W 106-93	Ihor Zaytsev (25)	Samuel Deguara (17)	Lin Chih-Chieh (7)	Xinzhuang Gymnasium; 5,977	1-0
2	November 14	@Kaohsiung Steelers	L 89-95	Samuel Deguara (18)	Samuel Deguara (15)	Joseph Lin (5)	Fengshan Arena; 4,866	1-1
3	November 20	Hsinchu JKO Lioneers	W 97-94	Joseph Lin (25)	Samuel Deguara (13)	Joseph Lin (6)	National Taiwan University Sports Center; 2,955	2-1
4	November 21	@Taoyuan Pilots	W 89-74	Chien Wei-Ju (16)	Tsai Wen-Cheng (9)	Ihor Zaytsev (4); Tseng Wen-Ting (4)	National Taiwan University Sports Center; 3,087	3-1

=== Regular season ===
2021–22 regular season game log Total: 18-12 (Home: 9–6; Road: 9–6)
Game	Date	Team	Score	High points	High rebounds	High assists	Location Attendance	Record
1	December 4	Formosa Taishin Dreamers	L 108-111	Samuel Deguara (30)	Samuel Deguara (20)	Chang Tsung-Hsien (7)	Taipei Heping Basketball Gymnasium; 6,788	0-1
2	December 5	Kaohsiung Steelers	W 107-82	Mike Singletary (37)	Mike Singletary (14); Brendon Smart (14); Ihor Zaytsev (14)	Mike Singletary (5)	Taipei Heping Basketball Gymnasium; 6,062	1-1
3	December 11	@Hsinchu JKO Lioneers	W 98-87	Mike Singletary (33)	Mike Singletary (17)	Mike Singletary (5)	Hsinchu County Stadium; 7,207	2-1
4	December 18	@New Taipei Kings	L 102-109	Mike Singletary (27)	Mike Singletary (17)	Mike Singletary (7)	Xinzhuang Gymnasium; 6,032	2-2
5	December 25	@Hsinchu JKO Lioneers	W 92-82	Chang Tsung-Hsien (18)	Brendon Smart (15)	Joseph Lin (4); Chang Tsung-Hsien (4)	Hsinchu County Stadium; 6,714	3-2
6	January 1	Hsinchu JKO Lioneers	L 106-114	Mike Singletary (34)	Tseng Hsiang-Chun (10)	Joseph Lin (6)	Taipei Heping Basketball Gymnasium; 6,981	3-3
7	January 2	New Taipei Kings	W 120-115 (OT)	Ihor Zaytsev (27)	Ihor Zaytsev (16)	Joseph Lin (9)	Taipei Heping Basketball Gymnasium; 6,849	4-3
8	January 7	@Formosa Taishin Dreamers	L 80-86	Ihor Zaytsev (22)	Mike Singletary (16)	Joseph Lin (5)	Intercontinental Basketball Stadium; 3,000	4-4
9	January 9	@New Taipei Kings	W 95-91	Mike Singletary (26)	Mike Singletary (15)	Tseng Wen-Ting (7)	Xinzhuang Gymnasium; 6,058	5-4
10	January 15	New Taipei Kings	L 75-102	Mike Singletary (22)	Mike Singletary (8)	Tseng Wen-Ting (7)	Taipei Heping Basketball Gymnasium; 6,876	5-5
11	January 16	Taoyuan Pilots	W 103-84	Ihor Zaytsev (27)	Ihor Zaytsev (12); Samuel Deguara (12)	Joseph Lin (8)	Taipei Heping Basketball Gymnasium; 6,066	6-5
12	January 23	@Kaohsiung Steelers	L 82-94	Chang Tsung-Hsien (17)	Ihor Zaytsev (9)	Chang Tsung-Hsien (5)	Fengshan Arena; 4,798	6-6
13	February 12	@Formosa Taishin Dreamers	W 83-68	Mike Singletary (17)	Lin Chih-Chieh (11)	Mike Singletary (6)	Intercontinental Basketball Stadium; 3,000	7-6
14	February 19	@Kaohsiung Steelers	W 106-87	Chang Tsung-Hsien (28)	Mike Singletary (11)	Lai Ting-En (8)	Fengshan Arena; 4,382	8-6
PPD	February 27	Taoyuan Pilots	Postponed					
PPD	February 28	Formosa Taishin Dreamers	Postponed					
15	March 6	@Taoyuan Pilots	W 99-79	Samuel Deguara (22)	Samuel Deguara (17)	Mike Singletary (8)	Taoyuan Arena; 2,471	9-6
16	March 12	Formosa Taishin Dreamers	W 121-101	Mike Singletary (25)	Mike Singletary (16)	Mike Singletary (7)	Taipei Heping Basketball Gymnasium; 6,432	10-6
17	March 13	Taoyuan Pilots	W 91-82	Chang Tsung-Hsien (17)	Ihor Zaytsev (11)	Joseph Lin (7)	Taipei Heping Basketball Gymnasium; 5,262	11-6
18	March 18	Kaohsiung Steelers	W 111-91	Mike Singletary (26)	Mike Singletary (15)	Mike Singletary (12)	Taipei Heping Basketball Gymnasium; 5,875	12-6
19	March 20	@Taoyuan Pilots	W 95-85	Ihor Zaytsev (26)	Ihor Zaytsev (11)	Joseph Lin (7); Mike Singletary (7)	Taoyuan Arena; 2,106	13-6
20	March 26	@New Taipei Kings	L 99-107	Ihor Zaytsev (22)	Mike Singletary (14)	Chang Tsung-Hsien (7)	Xinzhuang Gymnasium; 6,220	13-7
21	April 3	Hsinchu JKO Lioneers	L 103-114	Perry Jones (27)	Lin Chih-Chieh (13)	Lin Chih-Chieh (8)	Taipei Heping Basketball Gymnasium; 6,085	13-8
22	April 4	Kaohsiung Steelers	W 113-97	Ihor Zaytsev (28)	Ihor Zaytsev (18)	Mike Singletary (9)	Taipei Heping Basketball Gymnasium; 5,955	14-8
23	April 10	@Hsinchu JKO Lioneers	L 91-98	Perry Jones (17)	Brendon Smart (9)	Joseph Lin (4); Tseng Wen-Ting (4)	Hsinchu County Stadium; 6,112	14-9
24	April 17	@Kaohsiung Steelers	W 109-87	Lin Chih-Chieh (23)	Ihor Zaytsev (13)	Mike Singletary (6)	Fengshan Arena; 4,563	15-9
25	April 23	@Formosa Taishin Dreamers	L 87-124	Ihor Zaytsev (16)	Ihor Zaytsev (12)	Lai Ting-En (7)	Intercontinental Basketball Stadium; 3,000	15-10
26	April 30	@Taoyuan Pilots	W 86-80	Chang Tsung-Hsien (22)	Perry Jones (12)	Chang Tsung-Hsien (6)	Taoyuan Arena; 1,728	16-10
PPD	May 7	Hsinchu JKO Lioneers	Postponed					
PPD	May 8	New Taipei Kings	Postponed					
27	May 14	Taoyuan Pilots	W 98-97	Mike Singletary (23)	Mike Singletary (11)	Lin Chih-Chieh (7)	Taipei Heping Basketball Gymnasium; 4,535	17-10
28	May 15	Formosa Taishin Dreamers	L 100-104	Mike Singletary (28)	Lin Chih-Chieh (6); Mike Singletary (6); Tseng Wen-Ting (6)	Chang Tsung-Hsien (7)	Taipei Heping Basketball Gymnasium; 5,018	17-11
29	May 18	New Taipei Kings	W 103-98	Mike Singletary (23)	Tsai Wen-Cheng (11)	Tseng Wen-Ting (7)	Taipei Heping Basketball Gymnasium; 4,662	18-11
30	May 21	Hsinchu JKO Lioneers	L 99-108	Lai Ting-En (22)	Ihor Zaytsev (11)	Chou Kuei-Yu (7)	Taipei Heping Basketball Gymnasium; 5,065	18-12

=== Playoffs ===
2022 playoffs game log Total: 3-1 (Home: 1–1; Road: 2–0)
Game	Date	Team	Score	High points	High rebounds	High assists	Location Attendance	Record
1	June 4	@Formosa Taishin Dreamers	W 98-89	Chang Tsung-Hsien (31)	Ihor Zaytsev (15)	Joseph Lin (5)	Intercontinental Basketball Stadium; 3,000	1-0
2	June 6	@Formosa Taishin Dreamers	W 100-94	Chang Tsung-Hsien (18)	Mike Singletary (11)	Tseng Wen-Ting (7)	Intercontinental Basketball Stadium; 3,000	2-0
3	June 10	Formosa Taishin Dreamers	L 80-95	Ihor Zaytsev (15)	Mike Singletary (15)	Mike Singletary (4)	Taipei Heping Basketball Gymnasium; 6,616	2-1
4	June 12	Formosa Taishin Dreamers	W 119-111(2OT)	Mike Singletary (37)	Mike Singletary (18)	Lin Chih-Chieh (5); Mike Singletary (5)	Taipei Heping Basketball Gymnasium; 5,962	3-1

=== Finals ===
2022 finals game log Total: 4-1 (home: 2–0; road: 2–1)
Game	Date	Team	Score	High points	High rebounds	High assists	Location Attendance	Record
1	June 18	@Hsinchu JKO Lioneers	L 101-102	Mike Singletary (33)	Mike Singletary (11)	Joseph Lin (4); Mike Singletary (4)	Hsinchu County Stadium; 7,200	0-1
2	June 20	@Hsinchu JKO Lioneers	W 102-81	Mike Singletary (33)	Mike Singletary (18)	Lin Chih-Chieh (6)	Hsinchu County Stadium; 7,200	1-1
3	June 23	Hsinchu JKO Lioneers	W 116-101	Mike Singletary (35)	Mike Singletary (11)	Mike Singletary (11)	Taipei Heping Basketball Gymnasium; 7,000	2-1
4	June 25	Hsinchu JKO Lioneers	W 128-110	Perry Jones (24); Mike Singletary (24)	Mike Singletary (17)	Tseng Hsiang-Chun (7)	Taipei Heping Basketball Gymnasium; 7,000	3-1
5	June 27	@Hsinchu JKO Lioneers	W 108-104	Mike Singletary (43)	Mike Singletary (13)	Tseng Hsiang-Chun (6)	Hsinchu County Stadium; 8,000	4-1

== Player statistics ==
Legend
GP	Games played	MPG	Minutes per game	2P%	2-point field goal percentage
3P%	3-point field goal percentage	FT%	Free throw percentage	RPG	Rebounds per game
APG	Assists per game	SPG	Steals per game	BPG	Blocks per game
PPG	Points per game		Led the league

=== Regular season ===
Player	GP	MPG	PPG	2P%	3P%	FT%	RPG	APG	SPG	BPG
Lai Ting-En	25	13:40	4.44	39.22%	38.18%	66.67%	1.84	1.80	1.24	0.00
Joseph Lin	23	28:54	11.83	53.79%	30.77%	64.71%	2.96	3.91	1.30	0.39
Chien Wei-Ju	27	14:08	4.81	41.18%	34.21%	55.56%	1.74	0.56	0.33	0.00
Chang Tsung-Hsien	26	28:20	12.46	40.60%	22.76%	73.53%	3.08	3.38	1.31	0.12
Chou Kuei-Yu	22	13:57	3.73	39.47%	31.82%	76.92%	1.59	1.50	0.73	0.14
Perry Jones	4	35:45	19.25	50.00%	58.33%	30.00%	7.75	2.25	1.00	1.25
Lin Chih-Chieh	26	22:31	10.92	62.79%	31.11%	71.43%	4.96	2.96	0.42	0.12
Lin Meng-Hsueh	25	14:54	3.20	50.82%	18.75%	45.00%	2.28	0.56	0.28	0.04
Tsai Wen-Cheng	30	14:49	4.67	41.59%	37.50%	62.50%	3.67	1.27	0.70	0.03
Mike Singletary	22	36:23	21.86	53.02%	32.60%	86.36%	11.77	4.59	1.41	0.68
Tseng Hsiang-Chun	23	13:07	3.78	44.07%	31.25%	50.00%	2.74	0.30	0.35	0.35
Brendon Smart	22	16:35	6.41	52.24%	35.29%	68.00%	5.77	0.50	0.64	0.55
Chang Keng-Yu	23	08:45	3.22	39.47%	37.04%	87.50%	1.00	0.09	0.35	0.22
Ihor Zaytsev	24	37:07	18.71	61.43%	40.22%	65.31%	10.08	1.71	0.79	1.38
Samuel Deguara	7	28:21	15.29	68.18%	0.00%	60.71%	10.43	1.00	0.57	0.43
Tseng Wen-Ting	22	22:10	5.59	58.97%	15.22%	52.63%	3.64	3.27	0.36	0.86

=== Playoffs ===
Player	GP	MPG	PPG	2P%	3P%	FT%	RPG	APG	SPG	BPG
Lai Ting-En	4	12:39	2.75	28.57%	25.00%	50.00%	0.50	0.25	1.00	0.00
Joseph Lin	4	25:16	8.50	28.57%	28.57%	80.00%	5.00	2.75	1.50	0.25
Chien Wei-Ju	3	07:05	2.00	0.00%	40.00%	0.00%	1.67	0.00	0.33	0.00
Chang Tsung-Hsien	4	32:47	14.25	41.38%	20.00%	80.00%	3.75	2.50	1.25	0.25
Chou Kuei-Yu	4	11:29	4.00	57.14%	0.00%	0.00%	1.75	1.00	0.75	0.00
Perry Jones	2	31:57	12.50	60.00%	11.11%	66.67%	6.50	2.00	0.00	0.50
Lin Chih-Chieh	4	29:03	16.00	43.48%	40.00%	66.67%	7.00	3.00	1.25	0.00
Lin Meng-Hsueh	Did not play									
Tsai Wen-Cheng	4	12:01	3.00	44.44%	0.00%	100.00%	2.00	0.75	0.00	0.25
Mike Singletary	3	40:35	22.33	60.00%	40.00%	86.36%	14.67	4.00	1.67	1.00
Tseng Hsiang-Chun	4	09:42	4.00	37.50%	0.00%	66.67%	1.75	0.25	0.00	0.00
Brendon Smart	4	11:44	5.25	30.00%	45.45%	0.00%	4.25	0.25	0.25	0.25
Chang Keng-Yu	Did not play									
Ihor Zaytsev	3	38:55	14.67	51.72%	15.38%	61.54%	9.00	1.67	1.00	1.33
Tseng Wen-Ting	4	26:50	6.00	53.33%	20.00%	62.50%	4.50	3.75	1.50	0.50

=== Finals ===
Player	GP	MPG	PPG	2P%	3P%	FT%	RPG	APG	SPG	BPG
Lai Ting-En	3	13:43	4.67	50.00%	33.33%	0.00%	1.00	1.33	0.33	0.00
Joseph Lin	5	20:11	5.80	45.45%	27.27%	0.00%	3.00	2.80	0.80	0.00
Chien Wei-Ju	4	05:02	1.00	0.00%	100.00%	50.00%	0.50	0.00	0.25	0.00
Chang Tsung-Hsien	5	27:45	11.20	43.75%	25.00%	72.22%	1.80	2.20	2.00	0.20
Chou Kuei-Yu	5	18:11	4.60	69.23%	11.11%	40.00%	1.40	1.40	0.80	0.00
Perry Jones	3	32:32	14.00	43.75%	27.27%	100.00%	5.67	3.67	1.00	0.33
Lin Chih-Chieh	5	23:08	15.20	61.54%	46.88%	75.00%	5.80	3.20	0.20	0.00
Lin Meng-Hsueh	2	02:53	0.00	0.00%	0.00%	0.00%	0.50	0.00	0.00	0.00
Tsai Wen-Cheng	5	19:23	10.00	50.00%	72.73%	57.14%	5.60	0.80	1.60	0.00
Mike Singletary	5	41:21	33.60	59.70%	42.86%	80.95%	14.00	5.60	2.00	0.60
Tseng Hsiang-Chun	5	21:02	7.40	50.00%	50.00%	62.50%	2.60	4.00	0.80	0.40
Brendon Smart	3	10:08	3.67	33.33%	50.00%	0.00%	4.00	0.33	0.00	0.33
Chang Keng-Yu	3	01:47	0.00	0.00%	0.00%	0.00%	0.00	0.00	0.00	0.00
Ihor Zaytsev	2	26:01	5.50	33.33%	37.50%	25.00%	3.00	1.50	0.00	1.50
Tseng Wen-Ting	4	23:01	5.50	33.33%	37.50%	25.00%	4.25	2.25	1.50	1.75

- Reference：

== Transactions ==
=== Trades ===
October 27, 2021
To Taipei Fubon Braves

- 2022 first-round pick
To Kaohsiung Steelers

- Wang Lu-Hsiang

=== Free Agency ===
==== Re-signed ====
Date	Player	Contract terms	Ref.
June 23, 2021	Mike Singletary	—	
September 14, 2021	Ihor Zaytsev	—	

==== Additions ====
Date	Player	Contract terms	Former team	Ref.
July 1, 2021	Chang Keng-Yu	—	Taoyuan Pilots	
August 12, 2021	Wang Lu-Hsiang	2+1-year contract, worth unknown	CCUT	
October 1, 2021	Samuel Deguara	—	(Japan) Tokyo Excellence	
March 9, 2022	Perry Jones	—	(United States) Windy City Bulls	

==== Subtractions ====
Date	Player	Reason	New Team	Ref.
June 3, 2021	Kuo Shao-Chieh	contract expired	Hsinchu JKO Lioneers	
June 29, 2021	Chang Po-Wei	contract expired	Kaohsiung Steelers	
September 17, 2021	Oscar Lin	contract expired	Tainan TSG GhostHawks	
September 28, 2021	Charles Garcia	contract expired	Tainan TSG GhostHawks	
March 21, 2022	Samuel Deguara	released	TaiwanBeer HeroBears	

== Awards ==
=== Finals awards ===
Recipient	Award	Ref.
Taipei Fubon Braves	2022 P. League+ champions	
Mike Singletary	Finals Most Valuable Player	

=== End-of-season awards ===
Recipient	Award	Ref.
Lin Chih-Chieh	Mr. Popular	
Lin Chih-Chieh	All-PLG 2nd Team	
Chang Tsung-Hsien	Best Dressed of the Year	
Tsai Cherng-Ru	General Manager of the Year	

=== Players of the Week ===
Week	Recipient	Date awarded	Ref.
Week 1	Mike Singletary	December 4 - December 5	
Week 2	Mike Singletary	December 11 - December 12	
Week 4	Brendon Smart	December 24 - December 26	
Week 5	Lin Chih-Chieh	January 1 - January 2	
Week 10	Chang Tsung-Hsien	February 18 - February 20	
