= 2021–22 Hsinchu JKO Lioneers season =

Taiwanese professional basketball season

Hsinchu JKO Lioneers
2021-22 season
- President: Hu Lung-Chih
- General Manager: Kenny Kao
- Head Coach: Lin Kuan-Lun
- Arena: Hsinchu County Stadium
- P. League+: 20-10(.667)
- Playoffs: P. League+ finals (lost to Braves 1-4)
- Scoring leader: Sim Bhullar(26.33)
- Rebounding leader: Sim Bhullar(20.81)
- Assists leader: Kao Kuo-Hao(4.42)
- Highest home attendance: 7,207 (December 11, 2021)
- Lowest home attendance: 4,012 (January 23, 2022)
- Average home attendance: 5,289
- Biggest win: Lioneers 91-65 Pilots (January 23, 2022)
- Biggest defeat: Lioneers 74-97 Dreamers (March 19, 2022)
- All statistics correct as of June 28, 2022.

The 2021–22 Hsinchu JKO Lioneers season was the franchise's 2nd season, its second season in the P. LEAGUE+ (PLG), its 2nd in Hsinchu County. The Lioneers are coached by Lin Kuan-Lun in his second year as head coach.

== Draft ==
Round	Pick	Player	Position	Status	School/club team
1	1	Chu Yun-Hao	F	Local	UCH

== Standings ==
Team	GP	W	L	PCT
z − Hsinchu JKO Lioneers	30	20	10	.667
x − Formosa Taishin Dreamers	30	19	11	.633
x − Taipei Fubon Braves	30	18	12	.600
x − New Taipei Kings	30	16	14	.533
Kaohsiung Steelers	29	9	20	.310
Taoyuan Pilots	29	7	22	.241

== Roster ==
Note: Flags indicate national team eligibility at FIBA-sanctioned events. Players may hold other non-FIBA nationalities not displayed.

2021–22 Hsinchu JKO Lioneers roster
Players
Coaches

Pos.	No.	Nat.	Name	Ht.	Wt.	Age	From
G	3	(Chinese Taipei)	Lin Ming-Yi	1.78 m (5 ft 10 in)	68 kg (150 lb)	29 – 27 March 1996	MingDao
G	4	(Chinese Taipei)	Kao Kuo-Hao	1.79 m (5 ft 10 in)	76 kg (168 lb)	27 – 22 September 1998	Southeast Missouri State
G	5	(Chinese Taipei)	Sung Yu-Hsuan	1.84 m (6 ft 0 in)	80 kg (176 lb)	35 – 5 December 1989	Chinese Culture
G	6	(United States) (Chinese Taipei)	Elliot Tan	1.78 m (5 ft 10 in)	78 kg (172 lb)	37 – 4 October 1988	Biola
G/F	7	(United States)	Nick Faust (I)	1.98 m (6 ft 6 in)	95 kg (209 lb)	32 – 25 February 1993	Long Beach State
F	8	(Chinese Taipei)	Chu Yun-Hao	1.94 m (6 ft 4 in)	90 kg (198 lb)	27 – 3 November 1997	Chien Hsin Tech
G	9	(Chinese Taipei)	Tien Hao	1.73 m (5 ft 8 in)	68 kg (150 lb)	27 – 16 September 1998	NCCU
F	11	(Chinese Taipei)	Hsiao Hsun-Yi	1.92 m (6 ft 4 in)	82 kg (181 lb)	33 – 23 October 1992	NTUA
F	12	(Chinese Taipei)	Lee Chia-Jui (C)	2.00 m (6 ft 7 in)	86 kg (190 lb)	30 – 4 December 1994	KLCIVS
F	24	(Chinese Taipei)	Kuo Shao-Chieh	1.90 m (6 ft 3 in)	80 kg (176 lb)	35 – 9 April 1990	TNU
F	31	(United States)	Mike Bruesewitz (I)	1.99 m (6 ft 6 in)	100 kg (220 lb)	35 – 9 August 1990	Wisconsin
C	35	(Canada)	Sim Bhullar (I)	2.26 m (7 ft 5 in)	140 kg (309 lb)	32 – 2 December 1992	New Mexico State
F	36	(Chinese Taipei)	Lin Yi-Huei	1.93 m (6 ft 4 in)	100 kg (220 lb)	39 – 24 March 1986	NTNU
C	52	(Macau)	Iong Ngai-San	2.00 m (6 ft 7 in)	108 kg (238 lb)	29 – 9 February 1996	NTNU
F	54	(Chinese Taipei)	Wu Tai-Hao	2.03 m (6 ft 8 in)	105 kg (231 lb)	40 – 7 February 1985	BYU–Hawaii

Head coach

- (Chinese Taipei) Lin Kuan-Lun

Assistant coach(es)

- (Chinese Taipei) Seng Hsin-Han

Strength & conditioning coach(es)

- (Chinese Taipei) Huang Sheng-Fu

Athletic trainer(s)

- (Chinese Taipei) Huang Chien-Yuan
- (Chinese Taipei) Ou Po-Hung

Legend

- (C) Team captain
- (I) Import player
- Injured

- Roster
Updated: 28 March 2022

== Game log ==
=== Taiwan 3x3 Basketball Association ===
==== Round 1 ====
September 4
3:45pm

Jeoutai Technology 14, Hsinchu Lioneers 21

Pingzhen Sports Center, Taoyuan City

September 4
4:45pm

Chang Jia M&E 12, Hsinchu Lioneers 21

Pingzhen Sports Center, Taoyuan City

September 5
2:45pm

Hsinchu Lioneers 21, DLIVE 18

Pingzhen Sports Center, Taoyuan City

September 5
3:45pm

Tai-Ning Skywalker 21, Hsinchu Lioneers 19

Pingzhen Sports Center, Taoyuan City

==== Round 2 ====
September 18
3:00pm

X-Line Fitness 18, Hsinchu Lioneers 20

Chaoma Sports Center, Taichung City

September 18
4:00pm

Hsinchu Lioneers 17, Tai-Ning Skywalker 21

Chaoma Sports Center, Taichung City

September 19
2:15pm

Chang Jia M&E 21, Hsinchu Lioneers 14

Chaoma Sports Center, Taichung City

==== Round 3 ====
September 25
3:15pm

Taishin Dreamers 21, Hsinchu Lioneers 15

Xindian Sports Center, New Taipei City

September 25
4:15pm

DLIVE 13, Hsinchu Lioneers 21

Xindian Sports Center, New Taipei City

September 26
2:30pm

Taoyuan Fighters 16, Hsinchu Lioneers 20

Xindian Sports Center, New Taipei City

September 26
3:40pm

Hsinchu Lioneers 21, Taishin Dreamers 20

Xindian Sports Center, New Taipei City

September 26
4:30pm

Hsinchu Lioneers 21, Style Aesthetic Clinic 11

Xindian Sports Center, New Taipei City

==== Round 4 ====
October 2
3:45pm

X-Line Fitness 19, Hsinchu Lioneers 18

Pingzhen Sports Center, Taoyuan City

October 2
4:45pm

Yohong Fighters 21, Hsinchu Lioneers 8

Pingzhen Sports Center, Taoyuan City

==== Round 5 ====
October 9
3:45pm

Taoyuan Fighters 21, Hsinchu Lioneers 13

Taipei Heping Basketball Gymnasium, Taipei City

October 9
4:45pm

DLIVE 21, Hsinchu Lioneers 19

Taipei Heping Basketball Gymnasium, Taipei City

==== Round 6 ====
October 16
3:15pm

Style Aesthetic Clinic 20, Hsinchu Lioneers 18

Bade Sports Center, Taoyuan City

October 16
4:15pm

Taishin Dreamers 19, Hsinchu Lioneers 21

Bade Sports Center, Taoyuan City

October 17
2:30pm

Kaohsiung Hanshin 137 22, Hsinchu Lioneers 16

Bade Sports Center, Taoyuan City

==== Round 7 ====
October 23
3:45pm

Yohong Fighters 21, Hsinchu Lioneers 12

Pingzhen Sports Center, Taoyuan City

October 23
4:45pm

Tai-Ning Skywalker 21, Hsinchu Lioneers 13

Pingzhen Sports Center, Taoyuan City

==== Final ====
October 30
4:00pm

Taoyuan Fighters 18, Hsinchu Lioneers 10

Chaoma Sports Center, Taichung City

=== Hsinchu JKO Lioneers Masters Game ===
October 9
5:00pm

NCCU Griffins 78, Hsinchu JKO Lioneers 100

Hsinchu County Stadium, Hsinchu County

October 14
7:00pm

SHU Tigers 38, Hsinchu JKO Lioneers 69

Hsinchu County Stadium, Hsinchu County

October 16
5:00pm

New Taipei CTBC DEA 89, Hsinchu JKO Lioneers 93

Hsinchu County Stadium, Hsinchu County

October 17
5:00pm

NTUA Sharks 53, Hsinchu JKO Lioneers 63

Hsinchu County Stadium, Hsinchu County

October 23
5:00pm

Taiwan Beer 81, Hsinchu JKO Lioneers 95

Hsinchu County Stadium, Hsinchu County

October 24
5:00pm

Tainan TSG GhostHawks 58, Hsinchu JKO Lioneers 94

Hsinchu County Stadium, Hsinchu County

=== Preseason ===
2021 preseason game log Total: 2-2 (home: 1–1; road: 1–1)
Game	Date	Team	Score	High points	High rebounds	High assists	Location Attendance	Record
1	November 6	@New Taipei Kings	W 96-87	Lin Yi-Huei (17); Kuo Shao-Chieh (17)	Kao Kuo-Hao (11)	Kao Kuo-Hao (9)	Xinzhuang Gymnasium; 4,075	1-0
2	November 7	Taoyuan Pilots	L 82-97	Lee Chia-Jui (25)	Lee Chia-Jui (9)	Kao Kuo-Hao (4)	Xinzhuang Gymnasium; 5,977	1-1
3	November 20	@Taipei Fubon Braves	L 94-97	Branden Dawson (20); Sim Bhullar (20)	Sim Bhullar (15)	Chu Yun-Hao (4); Tien Hao (4)	National Taiwan University Sports Center; 2,955	1-2
4	November 21	Formosa Taishin Dreamers	W 109-94	Sim Bhullar (39)	Sim Bhullar (18)	Elliot Tan (5)	National Taiwan University Sports Center; 3,087	2-2

=== Invitation Game ===
December 2
6:30pm

Hsinchu JKO Lioneers 133, Tainan TSG GhostHawks 98

Shao Tsung Gymnasium, Tainan City

=== Regular season ===
2021–22 regular season game log Total: 20-10 (home: 8–7; road: 12–3)
Game	Date	Team	Score	High points	High rebounds	High assists	Location Attendance	Record
1	December 11	Taipei Fubon Braves	L 87-98	Sim Bhullar (20)	Sim Bhullar (23)	Sim Bhullar (3)	Hsinchu County Stadium; 7,207	0-1
2	December 12	Kaohsiung Steelers	W 105-95	Nick Faust (29)	Sim Bhullar (26)	Kao Kuo-Hao (4)	Hsinchu County Stadium; 4,657	1-1
3	December 19	@Taoyuan Pilots	W 95-83	Sim Bhullar (32)	Sim Bhullar (27)	Lin Yi-Huei (6)	National Taiwan Sport University Multipurpose Gymnasium; 4,168	2-1
4	December 25	Taipei Fubon Braves	L 82-92	Nick Faust (22)	Nick Faust (16)	Nick Faust (4)	Hsinchu County Stadium; 6,714	2-2
5	December 26	New Taipei Kings	W 101-80	Sim Bhullar (35)	Sim Bhullar (19)	Lee Chia-Jui (7)	Hsinchu County Stadium; 4,055	3-2
6	January 1	@Taipei Fubon Braves	W 114-106	Nick Faust (45)	Sim Bhullar (12)	Sim Bhullar (5)	Taipei Heping Basketball Gymnasium; 6,981	4-2
7	January 8	Kaohsiung Steelers	L 97-98	Sim Bhullar (35)	Sim Bhullar (21)	Elliot Tan (6)	Hsinchu County Stadium; 4,234	4-3
8	January 9	Formosa Taishin Dreamers	W 86-80 (OT)	Sim Bhullar (34)	Sim Bhullar (31)	Lin Yi-Huei (4)	Hsinchu County Stadium; 5,521	5-3
9	January 15	@Formosa Taishin Dreamers	L 78-84	Branden Dawson (21)	Sim Bhullar (27)	Lin Yi-Huei (5)	Intercontinental Basketball Stadium; 3,000	5-4
10	January 21	@Kaohsiung Steelers	L 92-105	Branden Dawson (20)	Branden Dawson (15)	Kao Kuo-Hao (5)	Fengshan Arena; 3,952	5-5
11	January 23	Taoyuan Pilots	W 91-65	Branden Dawson (17)	Sim Bhullar (21)	Kao Kuo-Hao (3); Lee Chia-Jui (3)	Hsinchu County Stadium; 4,012	6-5
12	February 12	Taoyuan Pilots	W 101-80	Sim Bhullar (22)	Sim Bhullar (16)	Kao Kuo-Hao (8); Lin Yi-Huei (8)	Hsinchu County Stadium; 4,317	7-5
13	February 13	New Taipei Kings	L 92-97	Nick Faust (33)	Branden Dawson (18)	Lin Ming-Yi (5)	Hsinchu County Stadium; 5,027	7-6
PPD	February 19	@Taoyuan Pilots	Postponed					
PPD	February 26	@Formosa Taishin Dreamers	Postponed					
PPD	February 28	@New Taipei Kings	Postponed					
14	March 5	Kaohsiung Steelers	W 97-87	Sim Bhullar (27)	Sim Bhullar (18)	Tien Hao (6)	Hsinchu County Stadium; 6,035	8-6
15	March 6	New Taipei Kings	L 96-111	Sim Bhullar (34)	Sim Bhullar (14)	Lin Yi-Huei (6)	Hsinchu County Stadium; 5,572	8-7
16	March 12	@Kaohsiung Steelers	W 103-95	Nick Faust (47)	Sim Bhullar (20)	Tien Hao (6); Lin Yi-Huei (6)	Fengshan Arena; 4,325	9-7
17	March 19	@Formosa Taishin Dreamers	L 74-97	Nick Faust (20)	Sim Bhullar (15)	Tien Hao (4)	Intercontinental Basketball Stadium; 3,000	9-8
18	March 25	Taoyuan Pilots	L 89-97	Nick Faust (34)	Sim Bhullar (22)	Tien Hao (7)	Hsinchu County Stadium; 5,004	9-9
19	March 27	@Kaohsiung Steelers	W 107-96	Sim Bhullar (30)	Sim Bhullar (35)	Kao Kuo-Hao (5)	Fengshan Arena; 4,532	10-9
20	April 1	@Taoyuan Pilots	W 116-97	Sim Bhullar (27)	Sim Bhullar (22)	Kao Kuo-Hao (3); Nick Faust (3); Chu Yun-Hao (3); Sim Bhullar (3)	Taoyuan Arena; 2,780	11-9
21	April 3	@Taipei Fubon Braves	W 114-103	Nick Faust (31)	Sim Bhullar (20)	Kao Kuo-Hao (7)	Taipei Heping Basketball Gymnasium; 6,085	12-9
22	April 9	Formosa Taishin Dreamers	W 96-78	Kao Kuo-Hao (23)	Sim Bhullar (18)	Kao Kuo-Hao (7)	Hsinchu County Stadium; 5,865	13-9
23	April 10	Taipei Fubon Braves	W 98-91	Sim Bhullar (34)	Sim Bhullar (18)	Kao Kuo-Hao (9)	Hsinchu County Stadium; 6,112	14-9
24	April 17	@New Taipei Kings	W 123-116(OT)	Sim Bhullar (50)	Sim Bhullar (32)	Tien Hao (10)	Xinzhuang Gymnasium; 3,158	15-9
25	April 23	@New Taipei Kings	W 110-92	Sim Bhullar (30)	Sim Bhullar (21)	Kao Kuo-Hao (9)	Xinzhuang Gymnasium; 3,071	16-9
26	April 29	Formosa Taishin Dreamers	L 85-92	Mike Bruesewitz (21)	Mike Bruesewitz (20)	Kao Kuo-Hao (6)	Hsinchu County Stadium; 5,006	16-10
27	May 1	@Taoyuan Pilots	W 94-86	Nick Faust (31)	Nick Faust (16); Sim Bhullar (16)	Tien Hao (8)	Taoyuan Arena; 2,159	17-10
PPD	May 7	@Taipei Fubon Braves	Postponed					
28	May 13	@Formosa Taishin Dreamers	W 89-84	Sim Bhullar (24)	Sim Bhullar (20)	Chu Yun-Hao (7)	Intercontinental Basketball Stadium; 3,000	18-10
29	May 15	@New Taipei Kings	W 122-113(OT)	Nick Faust (37)	Sim Bhullar (27)	Tien Hao (9)	Xinzhuang Gymnasium; 2,852	19-10
30	May 21	@Taipei Fubon Braves	W 108-99	Nick Faust (36)	Mike Bruesewitz (13)	Nick Faust (5); Tien Hao (5)	Taipei Heping Basketball Gymnasium; 5,065	20-10

=== Playoffs ===
2022 playoffs game log Total: 3-2 (home: 3–0; road: 0–2)
Game	Date	Team	Score	High points	High rebounds	High assists	Location Attendance	Record
1	June 3	New Taipei Kings	W 97-86	Sim Bhullar (26)	Sim Bhullar (19)	Tien Hao (5)	Hsinchu County Stadium; 6,400	1-0
2	June 5	New Taipei Kings	W 99-91	Chu Yun-Hao (24)	Sim Bhullar (23)	Kao Kuo-Hao (6)	Hsinchu County Stadium; 6,002	2-0
3	June 9	@New Taipei Kings	L 93-111	Sim Bhullar (22)	Sim Bhullar (13)	Kao Kuo-Hao (6)	Xinzhuang Gymnasium; 4,577	2-1
4	June 11	@New Taipei Kings	L 77-97	Chu Yun-Hao (16)	Sim Bhullar (16)	Lee Chia-Jui (4)	Xinzhuang Gymnasium; 6,540	2-2
5	June 14	New Taipei Kings	W 98-93	Sim Bhullar (29)	Sim Bhullar (23)	Kao Kuo-Hao (6)	Hsinchu County Stadium; 6,400	3-2

=== Finals ===
2022 finals game log Total: 1-4 (home: 1–2; road: 0–2)
Game	Date	Team	Score	High points	High rebounds	High assists	Location Attendance	Record
1	June 18	Taipei Fubon Braves	W 102-101	Lee Chia-Jui (25)	Sim Bhullar (12)	Lee Chia-Jui (5)	Hsinchu County Stadium; 7,200	1-0
2	June 20	Taipei Fubon Braves	L 81-102	Sim Bhullar (22)	Sim Bhullar (11)	Tien Hao (5)	Hsinchu County Stadium; 7,200	1-1
3	June 23	@Taipei Fubon Braves	L 101-116	Sim Bhullar (32)	Sim Bhullar (24)	Lin Ming-Yi (3)	Taipei Heping Basketball Gymnasium; 7,000	1-2
4	June 25	@Taipei Fubon Braves	L 110-128	Sim Bhullar (24)	Sim Bhullar (18)	Kao Kuo-Hao (7)	Taipei Heping Basketball Gymnasium; 7,000	1-3
5	June 27	Taipei Fubon Braves	L 104-108	Sim Bhullar (38)	Sim Bhullar (15)	Kao Kuo-Hao (8)	Hsinchu County Stadium; 8,000	1-4

== Player statistics ==
Legend
GP	Games played	MPG	Minutes per game	2P%	2-point field goal percentage
3P%	3-point field goal percentage	FT%	Free throw percentage	RPG	Rebounds per game
APG	Assists per game	SPG	Steals per game	BPG	Blocks per game
PPG	Points per game		Led the league

=== Regular season ===
Player	GP	MPG	PPG	2P%	3P%	FT%	RPG	APG	SPG	BPG
Lin Ming-Yi	14	14:48	1.57	18.18%	22.22%	100.00%	1.79	1.21	0.36	0.21
Kao Kuo-Hao	24	29:46	11.63	41.21%	36.36%	76.09%	4.42	4.04	2.13	0.13
Sung Yu-Hsuan	16	08:22	3.19	58.06%	50.00%	75.00%	0.94	0.25	0.13	0.00
Elliot Tan	25	19:16	5.80	43.48%	35.23%	75.00%	2.08	1.36	0.48	0.16
Nick Faust	23	34:33	24.83	42.90%	34.17%	77.87%	9.83	2.96	1.78	0.39
Chu Yun-Hao	30	23:41	7.50	46.67%	27.89%	51.43%	3.17	1.40	0.80	0.17
Tien Hao	27	17:56	3.56	36.21%	31.71%	62.50%	1.70	3.59	0.81	0.04
Hsiao Shun-Yi	28	11:47	3.14	40.00%	9.09%	65.79%	2.25	0.46	0.21	0.11
Lee Chia-Jui	21	24:24	5.95	49.43%	14.58%	51.43%	3.71	1.95	0.38	0.86
Branden Dawson	7	33:06	16.86	38.71%	13.33%	45.71%	14.43	1.71	3.00	1.14
Kuo Shao-Chieh	27	14:34	5.26	39.22%	38.81%	75.00%	1.67	0.59	0.22	0.30
Mike Bruesewitz	3	36:44	20.33	51.85%	50.00%	50.00%	13.00	2.00	1.00	0.27
Sim Bhullar	27	39:20	26.33	66.83%	33.33%	57.99%	20.81	2.26	0.63	2.48
Lin Yi-Huei	26	27:34	8.81	45.65%	23.76%	57.41%	3.42	2.69	1.08	0.27
Iong Ngai-San	23	06:49	1.61	45.45%	28.57%	64.71%	0.87	0.17	0.09	0.30
Wu Tai-Hao	28	09:11	1.50	39.47%	40.00%	42.86%	1.50	0.54	0.43	0.18

=== Playoffs ===
Player	GP	MPG	PPG	2P%	3P%	FT%	RPG	APG	SPG	BPG
Lin Ming-Yi	3	04:28	0.00	0.00%	0.00%	0.00%	0.00	1.00	0.33	0.00
Kao Kuo-Hao	5	37:17	13.80	50.00%	25.00%	69.23%	5.00	5.00	1.60	0.00
Sung Yu-Hsuan	1	00:10	0.00	0.00%	0.00%	0.00%	0.00	0.00	0.00	0.00
Elliot Tan	4	09:30	2.75	60.00%	100.00%	100.00%	0.50	0.00	0.25	0.25
Nick Faust	5	36:55	19.00	37.50%	25.64%	79.31%	9.60	2.20	1.60	0.20
Chu Yun-Hao	5	36:44	13.40	52.94%	36.36%	63.64%	2.40	0.80	1.20	0.00
Tien Hao	4	17:06	3.25	33.33%	33.33%	100.00%	1.00	3.00	0.25	0.00
Hsiao Shun-Yi	3	10:17	3.00	14.29%	50.00%	50.00%	2.00	0.33	0.33	0.33
Lee Chia-Jui	5	22:27	9.20	39.29%	35.00%	42.86%	3.80	1.20	1.00	0.40
Kuo Shao-Chieh	5	11:50	3.60	40.00%	30.77%	50.00%	1.20	0.40	0.80	0.00
Mike Bruesewitz	Did not play									
Sim Bhullar	5	38:46	22.40	74.60%	100.00%	60.00%	18.80	1.60	0.80	3.60
Lin Yi-Huei	4	18:25	4.50	28.57%	11.11%	75.00%	2.00	1.25	1.25	0.25
Iong Ngai-San	2	04:44	0.00	0.00%	0.00%	0.00%	0.00	0.00	0.00	0.00
Wu Tai-Hao	5	09:10	1.20	30.00%	0.00%	0.00%	1.60	0.40	0.20	0.40

=== Finals ===
Player	GP	MPG	PPG	2P%	3P%	FT%	RPG	APG	SPG	BPG
Lin Ming-Yi	3	19:40	3.67	12.50%	27.27%	0.00%	5.00	2.67	0.67	0.00
Kao Kuo-Hao	5	40:26	15.80	42.50%	40.00%	90.00%	5.40	4.80	1.80	0.00
Sung Yu-Hsuan	5	14:59	7.60	60.71%	33.33%	33.33%	1.60	0.60	0.20	0.00
Elliot Tan	2	15:30	4.50	0.00%	30.00%	0.00%	1.00	4.00	0.50	0.00
Nick Faust	3	36:57	16.00	28.57%	29.63%	100.00%	6.33	4.33	1.33	0.33
Chu Yun-Hao	5	26:59	6.80	42.11%	23.81%	42.86%	2.60	3.00	0.80	0.00
Tien Hao	2	21:46	6.00	50.00%	50.00%	0.00%	2.50	4.00	1.00	0.00
Hsiao Shun-Yi	5	14:05	4.00	42.11%	0.00%	66.67%	1.40	0.00	0.80	0.40
Lee Chia-Jui	5	17:38	7.20	48.00%	18.75%	50.00%	3.20	1.80	0.20	0.40
Kuo Shao-Chieh	3	14:32	6.33	30.00%	44.44%	50.00%	3.33	1.00	0.33	0.00
Mike Bruesewitz	2	35:25	14.00	27.78%	14.29%	92.31%	4.50	3.50	4.00	0.50
Sim Bhullar	5	35:47	27.60	79.10%	0.00%	57.14%	16.00	1.40	0.00	2.60
Lin Yi-Huei	4	12:04	4.25	25.00%	20.00%	35.71%	1.00	1.25	0.50	0.00
Iong Ngai-San	2	04:06	2.00	33.33%	0.00%	100.00%	1.50	0.50	0.00	0.00
Wu Tai-Hao	5	06:58	1.00	33.33%	0.00%	75.00%	2.40	0.20	0.20	0.60

- Reference：

== Transactions ==
=== Free Agency ===
==== Re-signed ====
Date	Player	Contract terms	Ref.
June 19, 2021	Branden Dawson	—	

==== Additions ====
Date	Player	Contract terms	Former team	Ref.
June 15, 2021	Kuo Shao-Chieh	2+1-year contract worth NT$5.72 million	Taipei Fubon Braves	
July 3, 2021	Lin Yi-Huei	2+1-year contract worth NT$9 million	Yulon Luxgen Dinos	
July 23, 2021	Chu Yun-Hao	3+1-year contract worth NT$5.98 million	UCH	
October 22, 2021	Sim Bhullar	—	Yulon Luxgen Dinos	
October 28, 2021	Nick Faust	—	(Poland) Spójnia Stargard	
March 28, 2022	Mike Bruesewitz	—	(Puerto Rico) Vaqueros de Bayamón	

==== Subtractions ====
Date	Player	Reason	New Team	Ref.
April 23, 2021	Pan Kuan-Han	contract expired	—	
June 3, 2021	Lin Li-Jen	contract buyout	New Taipei Kings	
June 29, 2021	Chieng Li-Huan	waived	Formosa Taishin Dreamers	
July 9, 2021	LaDontae Henton	contract expired retirement	—	
July 9, 2021	Tsai Chien-Yu	contract expired	Kaohsiung Jeoutai Technology	
July 26, 2021	Cheng Wei	contract expired	Taoyuan Leopards	
September 17, 2021	Lu Che-Yi	contract expired	Kaohsiung Steelers	
October 21, 2021	Hasheem Thabeet	contract expired	Tainan TSG GhostHawks	
March 1, 2022	Branden Dawson	mutual agreement due to family-related matters	TaiwanBeer HeroBears	

== Awards ==
=== End-of-Season Awards ===
Recipient	Award	Ref.
Sim Bhullar	Points Leader	
Sim Bhullar	Rebounds Leader	
Sim Bhullar	Import Player of the Year	
Sim Bhullar	All-PLG Team	
Hsinchu JKO Lioneers	Best Home Court	
Lin Kuan-Lun	Coach of the Year	
Kao Kuo-Hao	PLG All-Defensive Team	
Kao Kuo-Hao	All-PLG 2nd Team	

=== Players of the Month ===
Recipient	Award	Month awarded	Ref.
Sim Bhullar	April Most Valuable Player	April	
Nick Faust	May Most Valuable Player	May	

=== Players of the Week ===
Week	Recipient	Date awarded	Ref.
Preseason	Kao Kuo-Hao	November 6 - November 7	
Preseason	Sim Bhullar	November 20 - November 21	
Week 9	Branden Dawson	February 12 - February 13	
Week 13	Nick Faust	March 12 - March 13	
Week 16	Kao Kuo-Hao	April 1 - April 4	
Week 17	Kuo Shao-Chieh	April 9 - April 12	
Week 18	Sim Bhullar	April 16 - April 17	
