= 2021–22 New Taipei Kings season =

Taiwanese professional basketball season

New Taipei Kings
2021–22 season
- President: Walter Wang
- General Manager: James Mao
- Head Coach: Ryan Marchand
- Arena: Xinzhuang Gymnasium
- P. League+: 16-14(.533)
- Playoffs: Playoffs (lost to Lioneers 2–3)
- Scoring leader: Yang Chin-Min(21.21)
- Rebounding leader: Thomas Welsh(17.90)
- Assists leader: Lee Kai-Yan(5.96)
- Highest home attendance: 6,220 (March 26, 2022)
- Lowest home attendance: 1,505 (May 28, 2022)
- Average home attendance: 3,841
- Biggest win: Kings 100-70 Steelers (February 20, 2022); Kings 106-76 Steelers (May 14, 2022)
- Biggest defeat: Kings 87-126 Pilots (April 16, 2022)
- All statistics correct as of June 14, 2022.

The 2021–22 New Taipei Kings season was the franchise's 1st season, its first season in the P. LEAGUE+ (PLG), its 1st in New Taipei City. The Kings are coached by Ryan Marchand in his first year as head coach.

== Draft ==
Round	Pick	Player	Position	Status	School/club team
1	3	Hung Kai-Chieh	G	Local	NCCU
1	4	Chen Chun-Nan	G	Local	NTSU
1	7	Omar Niang	C	Foreign Student	NCCU
2	10	Tseng Yu-Hao	F	Local	NCCU
3	12	Lin Shih-Hsuan	G	Local	NTNU

The Kings acquired 2021 first-round draft pick from Taoyuan Pilots in exchange for 2022 first-round draft pick.

== Standings ==
Team	GP	W	L	PCT
z − Hsinchu JKO Lioneers	30	20	10	.667
x − Formosa Taishin Dreamers	30	19	11	.633
x − Taipei Fubon Braves	30	18	12	.600
x − New Taipei Kings	30	16	14	.533
Kaohsiung Steelers	29	9	20	.310
Taoyuan Pilots	29	7	22	.241

== Roster ==
Note: Flags indicate national team eligibility at FIBA-sanctioned events. Players may hold other non-FIBA nationalities not displayed.

2021–22 New Taipei Kings roster
Players
Coaches

Pos.	No.	Nat.	Name	Ht.	Wt.	DOB (YYYY-MM-DD)	From
F	1	(Chinese Taipei)	Lee Ying-Feng	1.93 m (6 ft 4 in)	87 kg (192 lb)	32 – 7 January 1993	TSU
G	2	(Chinese Taipei)	Lin Shih-Hsuan	1.77 m (5 ft 10 in)	76 kg (168 lb)	26 – 28 December 1998	NTNU
F	3	(Chinese Taipei)	Chen Chun-Nan	1.90 m (6 ft 3 in)	90 kg (198 lb)	25 – 20 April 2000	NTSU
F	6	(Chinese Taipei)	Yang Chin-Min (C)	1.90 m (6 ft 3 in)	92 kg (203 lb)	41 – 22 January 1984	Fu Jen
G	7	(Chinese Taipei)	Lin Li-Jen	1.83 m (6 ft 0 in)	85 kg (187 lb)	35 – 16 June 1990	MingDao
G	9	(Chinese Taipei)	Lee Kai-Yan	1.82 m (6 ft 0 in)	80 kg (176 lb)	32 – 6 May 1993	HWU
G	10	(Chinese Taipei)	Chien You-Che	1.80 m (5 ft 11 in)	80 kg (176 lb)	30 – 10 September 1995	Chien Hsin Tech
G	11	(Chinese Taipei)	Hung Kai-Chieh	1.85 m (6 ft 1 in)	85 kg (187 lb)	27 – 7 October 1998	NCCU
F	12	(United States)	Jerran Young (L)	1.98 m (6 ft 6 in)	99 kg (218 lb)	33 – 25 December 1991	Wright State
F	15	(Chinese Taipei)	Tseng Yu-Hao	1.96 m (6 ft 5 in)	94 kg (207 lb)	26 – 4 August 1999	NCCU
G	24	(Chinese Taipei)	Hung Chih-Shan	1.76 m (5 ft 9 in)	80 kg (176 lb)	40 – 5 July 1985	NTUT
C	25	(Senegal)	Omar Niang	2.05 m (6 ft 9 in)	98 kg (216 lb)	27 – 15 May 1998	NCCU
F	28	(France) (Chinese Taipei)	Steven Guinchard	1.95 m (6 ft 5 in)	85 kg (187 lb)	32 – 4 July 1993	EC Georgia
F/C	32	(United States) (United Kingdom)	Byron Mullens (I)	2.13 m (7 ft 0 in)	122 kg (269 lb)	36 – 14 February 1989	Ohio State
F	33	(Chinese Taipei)	Yang Hsing-Chih	1.95 m (6 ft 5 in)	100 kg (220 lb)	31 – 9 November 1993	NTNU
F	34	(United States)	DeAndre Liggins (I)	1.98 m (6 ft 6 in)	95 kg (209 lb)	37 – 31 March 1988	Kentucky
C	40	(United States)	Thomas Welsh (I)	2.13 m (7 ft 0 in)	100 kg (220 lb)	29 – 3 February 1996	UCLA
C	50	(Chinese Taipei)	Quincy Davis	2.03 m (6 ft 8 in)	114 kg (251 lb)	42 – 16 February 1983	Tulane

Head coach

- (United States) Ryan Marchand

Assistant coach(es)

- (Chinese Taipei) Chen Shih-Nien
- (Canada) Carlos Andrade
- (Chinese Taipei) Hsu Hao-Cheng

Strength & conditioning coach(es)

- (Chinese Taipei) Chang Chung-Hsi

Athletic trainer(s)

- (Chinese Taipei) Chiu Po-Kai

Team manager

- (Chinese Taipei) Hung Chih-Hu

Legend

- (C) Team captain
- (I) Import player
- (L) On leave from the team
- Injured

- Roster
Updated: 30 March, 2022

== Game log ==
=== Preseason ===
2021 preseason game log Total: 1-3 (home: 1–2; road: 0–1)
Game	Date	Team	Score	High points	High rebounds	High assists	Location Attendance	Record
1	November 6	Hsinchu JKO Lioneers	L 87-96	Yang Hsing-Chih (17)	Yang Hsing-Chih (6); Lee Kai-Yan (6); Yang Chin-Min (6)	Lee Kai-Yan (6)	Xinzhuang Gymnasium; 4,075	0-1
2	November 7	Taipei Fubon Braves	L 93-106	Chien You-Che (21)	Omar Niang (8)	Lin Shih-Hsuan (8)	Xinzhuang Gymnasium; 5,977	0-2
3	November 20	@Formosa Taishin Dreamers	L 87-89	Hung Kai-Chieh (17)	Yang Chin-Min (11); Steven Guinchard (11)	Yang Chin-Min (6)	National Taiwan University Sports Center; 2,955	0-3
4	November 21	Kaohsiung Steelers	W 100-82	Yang Chin-Min (16)	Lee Kai-Yan (11)	Yang Chin-Min (8)	National Taiwan University Sports Center; 3,087	1-3

=== Regular season ===
2021–22 regular season game log Total: 16-14 (home: 7–8; road: 9–6)
Game	Date	Team	Score	High points	High rebounds	High assists	Location Attendance	Record
1	December 11	@Formosa Taishin Dreamers	W 84-64	Yang Chin-Min (28)	Thomas Welsh (28)	Lee Kai-Yan (4)	Intercontinental Basketball Stadium; 3,000	1-0
2	December 18	Taipei Fubon Braves	W 109-102	Lee Kai-Yan (27)	Thomas Welsh (15)	Lee Kai-Yan (8)	Xinzhuang Gymnasium; 6,032	2-0
3	December 19	Formosa Taishin Dreamers	W 94-89	Thomas Welsh (28)	Thomas Welsh (17)	Yang Chin-Min (7)	Xinzhuang Gymnasium; 3,328	3-0
4	December 24	Taoyuan Pilots	L 94-109	Yang Chin-Min (29)	Yang Chin-Min (11)	Lee Kai-Yan (13)	Xinzhuang Gymnasium; 5,516	3-1
5	December 26	@Hsinchu JKO Lioneers	L 80-101	Yang Chin-Min (23)	Chen Chun-Nan (5); Yang Chin-Min (5)	Lin Shih-Hsuan (4)	Hsinchu County Stadium; 4,055	3-2
6	January 2	@Taipei Fubon Braves	L 115-120(OT)	Thomas Welsh (24)	Thomas Welsh (17)	Lee Kai-Yan (9)	Taipei Heping Basketball Gymnasium; 6,849	3-3
7	January 8	Taoyuan Pilots	W 101-90	Chris McCullough (25)	Thomas Welsh (15)	Lee Kai-Yan (11)	Xinzhuang Gymnasium; 5,061	4-3
8	January 9	Taipei Fubon Braves	L 91-95	Yang Chin-Min (23)	Thomas Welsh (29)	Yang Chin-Min (7)	Xinzhuang Gymnasium; 6,058	4-4
9	January 15	@Taipei Fubon Braves	W 102-75	Chris McCullough (27)	Thomas Welsh (16)	Lee Kai-Yan (8)	Taipei Heping Basketball Gymnasium; 6,876	5-4
PPD	February 11	@Taoyuan Pilots	Postponed					
10	February 13	@Hsinchu JKO Lioneers	W 97-92	Chris McCullough (20); Lee Kai-Yan (20)	Thomas Welsh (22)	Lee Kai-Yan (5)	Hsinchu County Stadium; 5,027	6-4
11	February 18	@Formosa Taishin Dreamers	L 99-115	Chris McCullough (33)	Chris McCullough (11)	Lin Shih-Hsuan (2); Chris McCullough (2); Hung Chih-Shan (2)	Intercontinental Basketball Stadium; 3,000	6-5
12	February 20	@Kaohsiung Steelers	W 100-70	DeAndre Liggins (17); Quincy Davis (17)	Thomas Welsh (19)	DeAndre Liggins (5); Quincy Davis (5)	Fengshan Arena; 4,018	7-5
PPD	February 27	Kaohsiung Steelers	Postponed					
PPD	February 28	Hsinchu JKO Lioneers	Postponed					
13	March 6	@Hsinchu JKO Lioneers	W 111-96	Thomas Welsh (25)	Thomas Welsh (11)	Lee Kai-Yan (6)	Hsinchu County Stadium; 5,572	8-5
14	March 8	@Taoyuan Pilots	L 95-97	DeAndre Liggins (18)	Quincy Davis (16)	DeAndre Liggins (7)	Taoyuan Arena; 2,569	8-6
15	March 13	@Kaohsiung Steelers	W 98-93	Yang Chin-Min (39)	Thomas Welsh (17)	Lee Kai-Yan (3)	Fengshan Arena; 4,123	9-6
16	March 19	@Taoyuan Pilots	W 102-92	Yang Chin-Min (23)	Thomas Welsh (23)	Hung Chih-Shan (6)	Taoyuan Arena; 2,511	10-6
17	March 26	Taipei Fubon Braves	W 107-99	Thomas Welsh (24)	Thomas Welsh (15)	Lee Kai-Yan (8)	Xinzhuang Gymnasium; 6,220	11-6
18	March 27	Taoyuan Pilots	W 111-104	Yang Chin-Min (26)	Thomas Welsh (16)	Lee Kai-Yan (8)	Xinzhuang Gymnasium; 3,171	12-6
19	April 2	Kaohsiung Steelers	W 105-94	DeAndre Liggins (22)	Thomas Welsh (16)	Lee Kai-Yan (9)	Xinzhuang Gymnasium; 4,333	13-6
20	April 4	@Formosa Taishin Dreamers	W 93-91	Yang Chin-Min (34)	Thomas Welsh (18)	DeAndre Liggins (5)	Intercontinental Basketball Stadium; 3,000	14-6
21	April 9	@Taoyuan Pilots	W 95-85	Yang Chin-Min (16); Lee Kai-Yan (16)	Thomas Welsh (19)	Lee Kai-Yan (5)	Taoyuan Arena; 2,791	15-6
22	April 16	Taoyuan Pilots	L 87-126	Quincy Davis (18)	Quincy Davis (7)	Lee Kai-Yan (6)	Xinzhuang Gymnasium; 3,106	15-7
23	April 17	Hsinchu JKO Lioneers	L 116-123(OT)	Yang Chin-Min (35)	Quincy Davis (11)	DeAndre Liggins (11)	Xinzhuang Gymnasium; 3,158	15-8
24	April 23	Hsinchu JKO Lioneers	L 92-110	Yang Chin-Min (28)	Quincy Davis (13)	DeAndre Liggins (5)	Xinzhuang Gymnasium; 3,071	15-9
25	April 24	Kaohsiung Steelers	L 92-101	DeAndre Liggins (28)	DeAndre Liggins (18)	DeAndre Liggins (6)	Xinzhuang Gymnasium; 2,012	15-10
26	April 30	@Kaohsiung Steelers	L 80-100	Yang Chin-Min (24)	DeAndre Liggins (12)	Lin Shih-Hsuan (4); Lee Kai-Yan (4)	Fengshan Arena; 3,215	15-11
PPD	May 6	Formosa Taishin Dreamers	Postponed					
PPD	May 8	@Taipei Fubon Braves	Postponed					
27	May 14	Kaohsiung Steelers	W 106-76	DeAndre Liggins (21)	Byron Mullens (17)	Lee Kai-Yan (9)	Xinzhuang Gymnasium; 2,194	16-11
28	May 15	Hsinchu JKO Lioneers	L 113-122(OT)	Yang Chin-Min (32)	Thomas Welsh (20)	Lee Kai-Yan (11)	Xinzhuang Gymnasium; 2,852	16-12
29	May 18	@Taipei Fubon Braves	L 98-103	Thomas Welsh (21)	Thomas Welsh (15)	DeAndre Liggins (8)	Taipei Heping Basketball Gymnasium; 4,662	16-13
PPD	May 19	Formosa Taishin Dreamers	Postponed					
30	May 28	Formosa Taishin Dreamers	L 85-100	Byron Mullens (26)	Byron Mullens (18)	Chen Chun-Nan (4); Hung Chih-Shan (4); Byron Mullens (4)	Xinzhuang Gymnasium; 1,505	16-14

=== Playoffs ===
2022 playoffs game log Total: 2-3 (home: 2–0; road: 0–3)
Game	Date	Team	Score	High points	High rebounds	High assists	Location Attendance	Record
1	June 3	@Hsinchu JKO Lioneers	L 86-97	Thomas Welsh (24)	Thomas Welsh (15)	Lee Kai-Yan (7)	Hsinchu County Stadium; 6,400	0-1
2	June 5	@Hsinchu JKO Lioneers	L 91-99	Byron Mullens (22); Thomas Welsh (22)	Thomas Welsh (27)	Lee Kai-Yan (6)	Hsinchu County Stadium; 6,002	0-2
3	June 9	Hsinchu JKO Lioneers	W 111-93	Thomas Welsh (34)	Thomas Welsh (17)	Yang Chin-Min (12)	Xinzhuang Gymnasium; 4,577	1-2
4	June 11	Hsinchu JKO Lioneers	W 97-77	Yang Chin-Min (32)	Byron Mullens (16)	Lee Kai-Yan (9)	Xinzhuang Gymnasium; 6,540	2-2
5	June 14	@Hsinchu JKO Lioneers	L 93-98	Quincy Davis (24)	Quincy Davis (16)	DeAndre Liggins (5)	Hsinchu County Stadium; 6,400	2-3

== Player statistics ==
Legend
GP	Games played	MPG	Minutes per game	2P%	2-point field goal percentage
3P%	3-point field goal percentage	FT%	Free throw percentage	RPG	Rebounds per game
APG	Assists per game	SPG	Steals per game	BPG	Blocks per game
PPG	Points per game		Led the league

=== Regular season ===
Player	GP	MPG	PPG	2P%	3P%	FT%	RPG	APG	SPG	BPG
Lee Ying-Feng	22	12:37	4.09	34.69%	25.00%	76.92%	2.27	0.55	0.41	0.14
Lin Shih-Hsuan	19	13:26	2.68	41.67%	20.69%	54.17%	1.58	1.84	0.79	0.00
Chen Chun-Nan	20	14:03	4.15	36.54%	37.50%	52.94%	1.60	0.85	0.50	0.15
Chris McCullough	7	32:19	20.86	35.53%	42.11%	58.82%	8.57	1.71	0.86	1.14
Yang Chin-Min	29	34:15	21.21	44.53%	32.50%	84.29%	4.86	3.21	1.28	0.10
Lin Li-Jen	16	09:27	3.31	21.05%	27.66%	75.00%	0.94	0.19	0.25	0.06
Lee Kai-Yan	27	32:15	12.70	47.12%	30.77%	71.28%	5.78	5.96	2.19	0.33
Chien You-Che	28	18:17	6.86	51.67%	35.71%	76.92%	1.36	0.54	0.50	0.11
Hung Kai-Chieh	27	22:55	7.07	42.42%	30.47%	81.82%	1.96	1.70	1.04	0.04
Tseng Yu-Hao	4	06:28	1.50	28.57%	0.00%	100.00%	0.75	0.00	0.50	0.50
Hung Chih-Shan	18	18:01	3.78	46.67%	25.93%	85.71%	1.89	2.50	0.28	0.06
Omar Niang	13	10:14	1.15	31.82%	0.00%	33.33%	2.85	0.46	0.46	0.15
Steven Guinchard	25	14:20	4.36	29.41%	25.00%	77.27%	2.36	0.72	0.52	0.16
Byron Mullens	3	32:44	17.33	51.52%	20.83%	37.50%	16.00	2.67	0.67	3.00
Yang Hsing-Chih	24	15:26	3.38	45.95%	0.00%	50.00%	2.00	0.58	0.50	0.17
DeAndre Liggins	16	36:50	16.38	47.42%	40.00%	66.67%	8.31	5.06	1.81	0.56
Thomas Welsh	20	37:10	17.65	66.10%	28.89%	66.13%	17.90	1.90	0.95	1.40
Quincy Davis	19	23:22	12.74	63.73%	42.59%	65.15%	8.74	1.63	1.05	1.63

=== Playoffs ===
Player	GP	MPG	PPG	2P%	3P%	FT%	RPG	APG	SPG	BPG
Lee Ying-Feng	3	01:16	0.67	100.00%	0.00%	0.00%	0.33	0.00	0.00	0.00
Lin Shih-Hsuan	4	01:19	0.00	0.00%	0.00%	0.00%	0.00	0.50	0.00	0.00
Chen Chun-Nan	4	06:04	1.00	33.33%	0.00%	0.00%	0.50	0.00	0.00	0.00
Yang Chin-Min	5	37:36	18.60	37.88%	23.81%	80.00%	3.20	4.20	0.40	0.00
Lin Li-Jen	1	00:10	0.00	0.00%	0.00%	0.00%	0.00	0.00	0.00	0.00
Lee Kai-Yan	5	33:30	7.20	34.78%	26.67%	57.14%	4.40	6.00	3.00	0.20
Chien You-Che	5	06:56	2.20	40.00%	33.33%	33.33%	0.20	0.00	0.20	0.00
Hung Kai-Chieh	4	22:06	8.00	40.00%	32.14%	100.00%	1.75	1.25	1.75	0.00
Tseng Yu-Hao	Did not play									
Hung Chih-Shan	5	20:42	3.60	37.50%	27.27%	60.00%	2.00	3.40	0.40	0.00
Omar Niang	Did not play									
Steven Guinchard	5	13:55	3.60	66.67%	25.00%	50.00%	0.60	0.40	1.20	0.00
Byron Mullens	4	30:02	18.25	42.2%	34.78%	61.11%	11.50	3.00	0.75	2.50
Yang Hsing-Chih	3	03:14	1.00	100.00%	0.00%	50.00%	1.33	0.00	0.00	0.00
DeAndre Liggins	2	37:50	15.00	46.15%	30.00%	69.23%	8.50	5.50	2.00	0.50
Thomas Welsh	4	37:59	23.25	59.62%	35.00%	83.33%	17.25	2.00	1.00	0.25
Quincy Davis	5	31:26	13.00	46.67%	33.33%	76.47%	9.40	1.80	1.20	2.40

- Reference：

== Transactions ==
=== Free Agency ===
==== Additions ====
Date	Player	Contract terms	Former team	Ref.
June 10, 2021	Lin Li-Jen	—	Hsinchu JKO Lioneers	
June 19, 2021	Chien You-Che	—	Taiwan Beer	
June 25, 2021	Lee Ying-Feng	—	Kaohsiung Jeoutai Technology	
July 1, 2021	Lee Kai-Yan	—	Yulon Luxgen Dinos	
August 13, 2021	Yang Hsing-Chih	—	Taipei Fubon Braves	
August 20, 2021	Hung Kai-Chieh	—	NCCU Griffins	
August 31, 2021	Chen Chun-Nan	—	NTSU	
August 31, 2021	Omar Niang	—	NCCU Griffins	
August 31, 2021	Tseng Yu-Hao	—	NCCU Griffins	
August 31, 2021	Lin Shih-Hsuan	—	NTNU Master	
September 10, 2021	Yang Chin-Min	3-year contract, worth unknown	Formosa Taishin Dreamers	
September 17, 2021	Jerran Young	—	Formosa Taishin Dreamers	
September 24, 2021	Thomas Welsh	—	(Belgium) B.C. Oostende	
October 13, 2021	Quincy Davis	—	Taoyuan Pilots	
October 15, 2021	Steven Guinchard	—	(France) Cran Pringy Basket	
October 16, 2021	Hung Chih-Shan	—	Taipei Fubon Braves	
November 17, 2021	Chris McCullough	—	(Puerto Rico) Gigantes de Carolina	
December 3, 2021	DeAndre Liggins	—	(United Kingdom) London Lions	
March 30, 2022	Byron Mullens	—	(United Kingdom) London Lions	

==== Subtractions ====
Date	Player	Reason	New Team	Ref.
March 18, 2022	Chris McCullough	injury	Formosa Taishin Dreamers	

== Awards ==
=== End-of-Season Awards ===
Recipient	Award	Ref.
Lee Kai-Yan	Assists Leader	
Lee Kai-Yan	PLG All-Defensive Team	
Lee Kai-Yan	All-PLG Team	
Thomas Welsh	Defensive Player of the Year	
Thomas Welsh	PLG All-Defensive Team	
Thomas Welsh	All-PLG 2nd Team	
Yang Chin-Min	Most Valuable Player Award	
Yang Chin-Min	All-PLG Team	

=== Players of the Month ===
Recipient	Award	Month awarded	Ref.
Thomas Welsh	December Most Valuable Player	December	
Yang Chin-Min	March Most Valuable Player	March	

=== Players of the Week ===
Week	Recipient	Date awarded	Ref.
Week 3	Lee Kai-Yan	December 18 - December 19	
Week 15	Yang Chin-Min	March 25 - March 27	
