= Nemanja Bešović =

Serbian basketball player (born 1992)

Personal information
- Born: June 8, 1992 (age 34) Podgorica, FR Yugoslavia
- Listed height: 2.21 m (7 ft 3 in)
- Listed weight: 120 kg (265 lb)

Career information
- NBA draft: 2014: undrafted
- Playing career: 2007–2025
- Position: Center

Career history
- 2007–2008: Vojvodina Srbijagas
- 2008–2012: Partizan
- 2013–2015: Spirou Charleroi
- 2013–2015: → VOO Wolves Verviers-Pepinster
- 2016: Strumica
- 2017–2018: Al Ahli Doha
- 2018–2019: Al-Gharafa Doha
- 2019–2020: Zob Ahan Isfahan
- 2020–2021: Baniyas Abu Dhabi
- 2021–2022: Academic Plovdiv
- 2022: Taoyuan Pilots
- 2022–2023: Al-Karamah
- 2024: Tangerang Hawks
- 2024–2025: Al-Kahrabaa

Career highlights
- 4× Serbian League champion (2009–2012); 4× Serbian Cup winner (2009–2012); 3× Adriatic League champion (2009–2011)

Nemanja Bešović (Cyrillic: Немања Бешовић; born June 8, 1992) is a Serbian former professional basketball player. At 2.21 m (7 ft 3 in), he played at the center position.

== Professional career ==
Bešović started playing basketball with youth selections of KK Budućnost Podgorica. He made his debut at senior level with KK Vojvodina Srbijagas during the 2007–08 season. In November 2008, Bešović moved to KK Partizan. Bešović requested termination of his contract on September 22, 2012, after not being selected for friendly games with Fuenlabrada.

On June 17, 2013, he signed a three-year deal with Spirou Charleroi, but was immediately sent on loan to VOO Wolves Verviers-Pepinster.

In September 2016, he signed with Macedonian club Strumica.

Bešović played for Al Ahli Doha of the Qatari Basketball League, averaging 19.5 points and 11.3 rebounds per game. He then signed with Al-Gharafa Doha on December 7, 2018.

In 2019-20 Bešović played for Zob Ahan Isfahan in the Iranian Basketball Super League where he averaged 15.5 points and 6.8 rebounds. He joined Academic Plovdiv of the National Basketball League in 2021 and averaged 10.9 points and 3.9 rebounds per game. He parted ways with the team on February 20, 2022.

On December 9, 2022, Bešović signed with Al-Karamah of the Syrian Basketball League.

On July 6, 2024, Bešović signed with Al-Kahrabaa of the Iraqi Basketball Premier League.

== Serbian national team ==
Bešović was a member of the Serbian junior team that won a gold medal at the FIBA U18 European Championship in 2009. He also won a silver medal at the 2011 FIBA U19 World Championship.
