= Mike Singletary (basketball) =

American basketball player

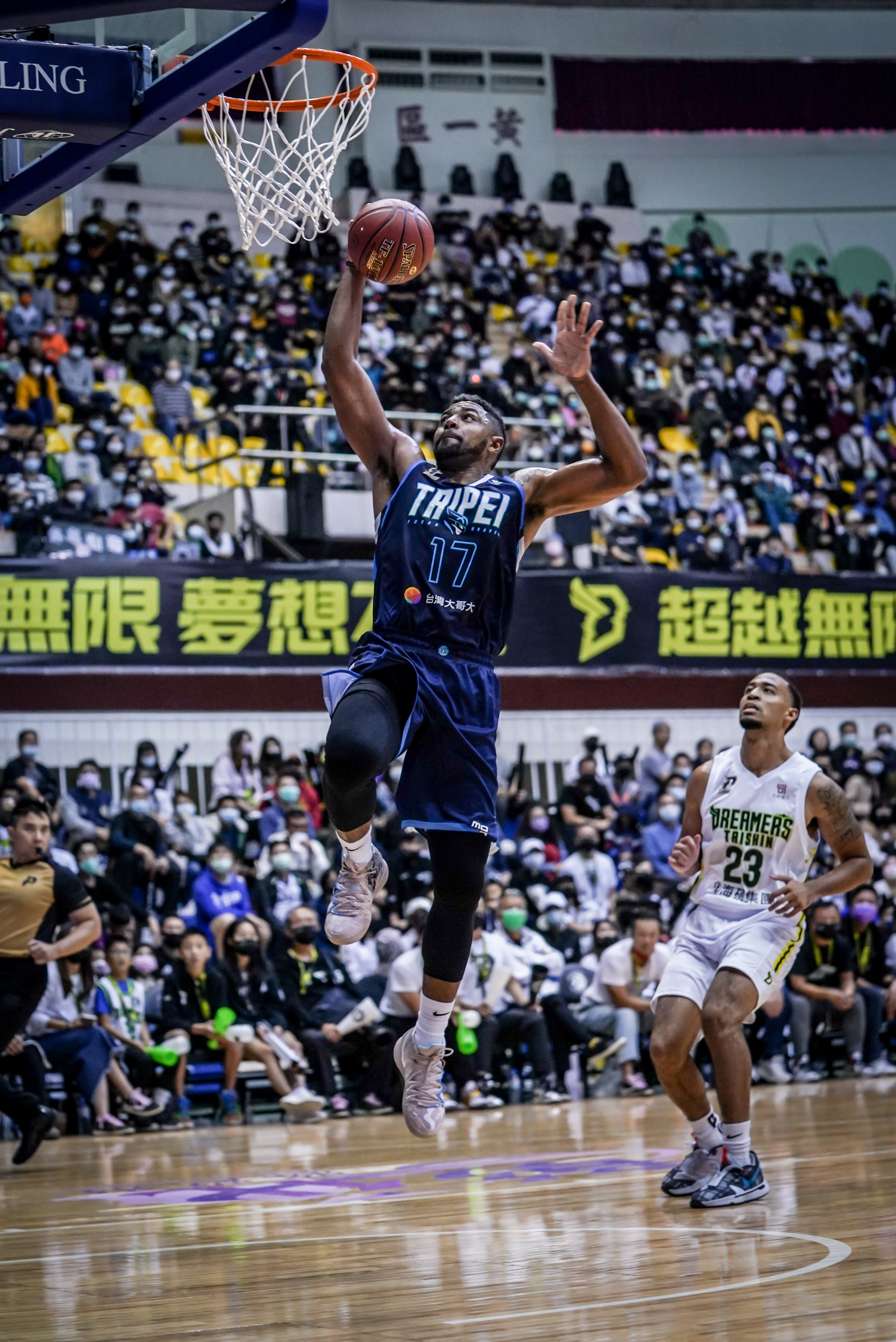
- Singletary with the Taipei Fubon Braves in 2020

No. 17 – Taipei Fubon Braves
- Position: Small forward / power forward
- League: P. League+

Personal information
- Born: September 19, 1988 (age 37) El Paso, Texas, U.S.
- Listed height: 6 ft 6 in (1.98 m)
- Listed weight: 227 lb (103 kg)

Career information
- High school: Kingwood (Houston, Texas)
- College: Texas Tech (2007–2011)
- NBA draft: 2011: undrafted
- Playing career: 2011–present

Career history
- 2011: Verviers-Pepinster
- 2012: Mornar Bar
- 2012–2013: Rio Grande Valley Vipers
- 2013: Erie BayHawks
- 2013: Rio Grande Valley Vipers
- 2013: Barako Bull Energy Cola
- 2014–2015: Ravenna
- 2016: Osaka Evessa
- 2016: San Miguel Beermen
- 2016-2020: Mono Vampire
- 2020–2024: Taipei Fubon Braves
- 2025: Kesatria Bengawan Solo
- 2025–present: Taipei Fubon Braves

Career highlights
- 3× P. League+ champion (2021, 2022, 2023); 2× P. League+ Finals MVP (2021, 2022); ASEAN Basketball League Player of the year, Import of the Year & Forward of the year (2019); Thailand League champion (2017); Thailand League MVP (2017); 2x Thailand Basketball Super League (2017, 2018); Thailand Basketball Super League MVP (2018); NBA D-League champion (2013); Serie A2 Basket All-Star (2015); NCAA Big 12 Tournament record of 29 straight points finishing with 43 total against Texas A&M in 2009

Michael Anthony Singletary (born September 19, 1988) is an American professional basketball player for Taipei Fubon Braves of the P. League+. He played college basketball for the Texas Tech Raiders.
