= Formosa Dreamers all-time roster =

The following is a list of players, both past and current, who appeared at least in one game for the Formosa Dreamers (2017–2020, 2023–present) or Formosa Taishin Dreamers (2020–2023) franchise.

== Players ==
Note: Statistics are correct through the end of the 2025–26 TPBL season.

G	Guard	PG	Point guard	SG	Shooting guard	G/F	Guard-forward	F	Forward	SF	Small forward	PF	Power forward	F/C	Forward-center	C	Center

^{x}	Denotes player who is currently on the Formosa Dreamers roster
0.0	Denotes the Formosa Dreamers statistics leader (min. 40 games played for the team for per-game statistics)
player	Denotes player who has played for the Formosa Dreamers in the ABL
player	Denotes player who has played for the Formosa Dreamers in the PLG

=== A ===
Player	Name	Nat.	Pos.	From	Yrs	Seasons	Statistics									Ref.
Player	Name	Nat.	Pos.	From	Yrs	Seasons	GP	MP	PTS	REB	AST	MPG	PPG	RPG	APG	Ref.
Ronnie Aguilar	–	(El Salvador) (United States)	C	Cal State Dominguez Hills	1	2017–2018	12	372:08	200	143	18	31:00	16.7	11.9	1.5	
Will Artino	–	(United States)	C	Creighton	1	2018–2019	23	789:43	485	247	70	34:20	21.1	10.7	3.0	

=== B ===
Player	Name	Nat.	Pos.	From	Yrs	Seasons	Statistics									Ref.
Player	Name	Nat.	Pos.	From	Yrs	Seasons	GP	MP	PTS	REB	AST	MPG	PPG	RPG	APG	Ref.
Charles Barratt	貝查理	(Taiwan) (United Kingdom)	G/F	RHUL	1	2017–2018	15	97:53	29	15	1	6:31	1.9	1.0	0.1	
Beau Beech	貝奇	(United States)	PF	North Florida	1	2024–2025	31	1059:55	552	306	55	34:11	17.8	9.9	1.8	
Anthony Bennett	班尼特	(Canada)	F	UNLV	1	2024–2025	5	138:46	80	45	6	27:45	16.0	9.0	1.2	
Ben Bentil^{x}	班提爾	(Ghana)	PF	Providence	1	2025–present	18	611:18	340	194	59	33:57	18.9	10.8	3.3	
Giorgi Bezhanishvili	貝扎尼什維利	(Austria) (Georgia (country))	F	Illinois	1	2023–2024	5	158:10	79	55	13	31:38	15.8	11.0	2.6	
Julian Boyd	布依德	(United States)	PF	LIU Brooklyn	3	2021–2022; 2023–2024; 2025–2026	63	1938:42	1103	651	124	30:46	17.5	10.3	2.0	

=== C ===
Player	Name	Nat.	Pos.	From	Yrs	Seasons	Statistics									Ref.
Player	Name	Nat.	Pos.	From	Yrs	Seasons	GP	MP	PTS	REB	AST	MPG	PPG	RPG	APG	Ref.
Chai Wei	柴瑋	(Taiwan)	G/F	TSU	2	2017–2019	19	259:34	79	20	7	13:39	4.2	1.1	0.4	
Chang Keng-Yu	張耕淯	(Taiwan)	G/F	NTUS	2	2018–2020	8	38:31	23	5	4	4:48	2.9	0.6	0.5	
Chang Tsung-Hsien^{x}	張宗憲	(Taiwan)	SG	BYU–Hawaii	4	2019–2020; 2024–present	68	1737:32	665	164	132	25:33	9.8	2.4	1.9	
Chen Hsiao-Jung	陳孝榮	(Taiwan)	F/C	DLIT	2	2018–2020	11	101:23	36	30	4	9:13	3.3	2.7	0.4	
Chen Jen-Jei^{x}	陳振傑	(Taiwan)	SG	Grand View	7	2020–present	121	1927:50	698	291	89	15:55	5.8	2.4	0.7	
Chen Shih-Nien	陳世念	(Taiwan)	G	TPEC	2	2018–2020	28	424:45	108	30	69	15:10	3.9	1.1	2.5	
Chen Yu-Han	陳昱翰	(Taiwan)	G	ISU	2	2017–2018; 2019–2020	27	536:09	186	52	40	19:51	6.9	1.9	1.5	
Cheng Chi-Kuan	鄭騏寬	(Taiwan)	G	SHU	1	2017–2018	16	228:54	55	27	10	14:18	3.4	1.7	0.6	
Cheng Hao-Hsuan	鄭皓璿	(Taiwan)	G/F	NDHU	1	2017–2018	2	10:23	0	2	1	5:11	0.0	1.0	0.5	
Cheng Tzu-Yang	鄭子洋	(Taiwan)	C	CCU	1	2021–2022	5	10:42	6	5	0	2:08	1.2	1.0	0.0	
Cheng Wei	鄭瑋	(Taiwan)	G	USC	1	2018–2019	19	216:38	65	23	24	11:24	3.4	1.2	1.3	
Chi Sung-Yu	紀松佑	(Taiwan)	F	CCU	1	2019–2020	2	3:59	0	1	0	1:59	0.0	0.5	0.0	
Chiang Yu-An^{x}	蔣淯安	(Taiwan)	PG	NTUS	3	2024–present	49	1480:42	542	172	193	30:13	11.1	3.5	3.9	
Kenneth Chien	錢肯尼	(United States) (Taiwan)	G/F	Broward	7	2017–2024	155	4241:24	1222	509	307	27:21	7.9	3.3	2.0	
Chien Wei-Ju^{x}	簡偉儒	(Taiwan)	SG	NTNU	3	2024–present	29	228:08	32	28	12	7:52	1.1	1.0	0.4	
Chieng Li-Huan	成力煥	(Taiwan) (United States)	G	NCTU	1	2021–2022	27	609:45	177	71	25	22:35	6.6	2.6	0.9	
Chou Po-Chen^{x}	周柏臣	(Taiwan)	PF	NTNU	5	2022–present	91	1011:33	130	205	24	11:06	1.4	2.3	0.3	
Chou Tzu-Hua	周資華	(Taiwan)	G	FJU	1	2017–2018	12	266:06	38	28	35	22:10	3.2	2.3	2.9	
Jaleel Cousins	–	(United States)	C	South Florida	1	2017–2018	5	140:01	74	62	3	28:00	14.8	12.4	0.6	
Douglas Creighton	簡浩	(Taiwan) (United States)	SF	Madonna	4	2021–2025	125	2724:25	796	375	197	21:47	6.4	3.0	1.6	

=== D ===
Player	Name	Nat.	Pos.	From	Yrs	Seasons	Statistics									Ref.
Player	Name	Nat.	Pos.	From	Yrs	Seasons	GP	MP	PTS	REB	AST	MPG	PPG	RPG	APG	Ref.
Lenny Daniel	–	(United States)	F	Cal State Northridge	1	2017–2018	12	418:26	217	132	31	34:52	18.1	11.0	2.6	

=== E ===
Player	Name	Nat.	Pos.	From	Yrs	Seasons	Statistics									Ref.
Player	Name	Nat.	Pos.	From	Yrs	Seasons	GP	MP	PTS	REB	AST	MPG	PPG	RPG	APG	Ref.
James Ennis	恩尼斯	(United States)	SF	Long Beach State	1	2025–2026	9	271:28	150	84	31	30:09	16.7	9.3	3.4	

=== F ===
Player	Name	Nat.	Pos.	From	Yrs	Seasons	Statistics									Ref.
Player	Name	Nat.	Pos.	From	Yrs	Seasons	GP	MP	PTS	REB	AST	MPG	PPG	RPG	APG	Ref.
Nick Faust	福斯特	(United States)	F	Long Beach State	1	2022–2023	1	27:00	16	9	6	27:00	16.0	9.0	6.0	
James Forrester	–	(Philippines) (Canada)	G/F	Arellano	1	2017–2018	2	52:52	18	7	4	26:26	9.0	3.5	2.0	
Cameron Forte	–	(United States)	F	Portland State	1	2017–2018	7	273:57	205	113	31	39:08	29.3	16.1	4.4	

=== G ===
Player	Name	Nat.	Pos.	From	Yrs	Seasons	Statistics									Ref.
Player	Name	Nat.	Pos.	From	Yrs	Seasons	GP	MP	PTS	REB	AST	MPG	PPG	RPG	APG	Ref.
Brandon Gilbeck^{x}	吉爾貝克 高柏鎧	(United States) (Taiwan)	C	Western Illinois	6	2021–present	151	4420:44	1956	1652	118	29:16	13.0	10.9	0.8	
Tevin Glass	–	(United States)	F	East Tennessee State	1	2018–2019	26	897:11	524	260	67	34:30	20.2	10.0	2.6	

=== H ===
Player	Name	Nat.	Pos.	From	Yrs	Seasons	Statistics									Ref.
Player	Name	Nat.	Pos.	From	Yrs	Seasons	GP	MP	PTS	REB	AST	MPG	PPG	RPG	APG	Ref.
Stephan Hicks	希克斯	(United States)	F/C	Cal State Northridge	2	2020–2022	12	417:36	263	154	20	34:48	21.9	12.8	1.7	
Aric Holman^{x}	霍爾曼	(United States)	PF	Mississippi State	3	2024–present	45	1351:04	788	496	145	30:01	17.5	11.0	3.2	

=== J ===
Player	Name	Nat.	Pos.	From	Yrs	Seasons	Statistics									Ref.
Player	Name	Nat.	Pos.	From	Yrs	Seasons	GP	MP	PTS	REB	AST	MPG	PPG	RPG	APG	Ref.
Stefan Janković	揚科維奇	(Serbia) (Canada)	C	Hawaii	2	2021–2022; 2024–2025	13	349:07	248	121	32	26:51	19.1	9.3	2.5	

=== K ===
Player	Name	Nat.	Pos.	From	Yrs	Seasons	Statistics									Ref.
Player	Name	Nat.	Pos.	From	Yrs	Seasons	GP	MP	PTS	REB	AST	MPG	PPG	RPG	APG	Ref.
İlkan Karaman	卡拉曼	(Turkey)	F	Turkey	1	2022–2023	13	411:21	271	175	39	31:39	20.8	13.5	3.0	
Marcus Keene	–	(United States)	G	Central Michigan	1	2019–2020	4	135:13	101	25	36	33:48	25.3	6.3	9.0	
Stanton Kidd^{x}	基德	(United States)	SF	Colorado State	1	2026–present	0	0:00	0	0	0	0:00	0.0	0.0	0.0	
Derek King	金德偉	(United States) (Taiwan)	F	UC Berkeley	1	2020–2021	6	59:39	14	2	1	9:56	2.3	0.3	0.2	

=== L ===
Player	Name	Nat.	Pos.	From	Yrs	Seasons	Statistics									Ref.
Player	Name	Nat.	Pos.	From	Yrs	Seasons	GP	MP	PTS	REB	AST	MPG	PPG	RPG	APG	Ref.
Lai Po-Lin	賴柏霖	(Taiwan)	G	MDU	1	2017–2018	1	1:28	0	0	0	1:28	0.0	0.0	0.0	
Ricky Ledo	利多	(United States)	G/F	South Kent	1	2021–2022	1	27:47	20	10	1	27:47	20.0	10.0	1.0	
Lee Hsueh-Lin	李學林	(Taiwan)	G	TPEC	2	2018–2020	27	613:44	59	55	85	22:43	2.2	2.0	3.1	
Lee Te-Wei^{x}	李德威	(Taiwan)	C	CCUT	6	2020–2024; 2025–present	118	2348:33	615	544	139	19:54	5.2	4.6	1.2	
Li Chia-Ching	李家慶	(Taiwan)	F	FJU	1	2017–2018	20	167:40	42	23	10	8:23	2.1	1.2	0.5	
Li Ping-Hung	李秉鴻	(Taiwan)	G	NTNU	1	2017–2018	14	174:01	19	15	19	12:25	1.4	1.1	1.4	
Lin Chun-Chi^{x}	林俊吉	(Taiwan)	PG	UCH	7	2020–present	184	4971:52	2385	595	800	27:01	13.0	3.2	4.3	
Lin Yao-Tsung	林耀宗	(Taiwan)	F	MDU	2	2022–2024	30	186:07	35	55	6	6:12	1.2	1.8	0.2	
Markus Lončar	龍查	(Bosnia and Herzegovina) (Croatia)	C	Bosnia and Herzegovina	1	2024–2025	7	220:29	86	89	8	31:29	12.3	12.7	1.1	
Lu Kuan-Liang^{x}	盧冠良	(Taiwan)	SG	NTUA	4	2022–present	131	2663:59	720	249	169	20:20	5.5	1.9	1.3	
Luo Jun-Quan	駱俊銓	(Taiwan)	G	OCU	1	2017–2018	5	50:50	7	4	6	10:10	1.4	0.8	1.2	

=== M ===
Player	Name	Nat.	Pos.	From	Yrs	Seasons	Statistics									Ref.
Player	Name	Nat.	Pos.	From	Yrs	Seasons	GP	MP	PTS	REB	AST	MPG	PPG	RPG	APG	Ref.
Ma Chien-Hao^{x}	馬建豪	(Taiwan)	SF	Georgia State	3	2024–present	56	1559:54	755	202	113	27:51	13.5	3.6	2.0	
Devyn Marble	德文馬布爾	(United States)	F	Iowa	1	2023–2024	17	486:40	316	98	75	28:38	18.6	5.8	4.4	
Erron Maxey	–	(United States)	F	Providence	1	2017–2018	1	36:40	34	13	2	36:40	34.0	13.0	2.0	
Chris McCullough	麥卡洛	(United States)	F	Syracuse	2	2022–2024	34	1158:13	673	433	71	34:04	19.8	12.7	2.1	
Liam McMorrow	–	(Canada)	C	Tennessee Tech	1	2019–2020	4	126:59	51	41	2	31:44	12.8	10.3	0.5	
Malcolm Miller	–	(United States)	G/F	Southern	1	2018–2019	26	966:42	572	194	157	37:10	22.0	7.5	6.0	
Malcolm Miller	米勒	(United States)	F	Holy Cross	1	2022–2023	5	198:36	89	52	10	39:43	17.8	10.4	2.0	
Jonah Morrison	譚傑龍	(Taiwan) (United Kingdom)	F/C	UBC	1	2020–2021	14	224:00	43	39	9	16:00	3.1	2.8	0.6	

=== O ===
Player	Name	Nat.	Pos.	From	Yrs	Seasons	Statistics									Ref.
Player	Name	Nat.	Pos.	From	Yrs	Seasons	GP	MP	PTS	REB	AST	MPG	PPG	RPG	APG	Ref.
Chukwunike Okosa	–	(Nigeria) (United States)	C	LSU	1	2017–2018	2	49:27	20	17	4	24:43	10.0	8.5	2.0	

=== P ===
Player	Name	Nat.	Pos.	From	Yrs	Seasons	Statistics									Ref.
Player	Name	Nat.	Pos.	From	Yrs	Seasons	GP	MP	PTS	REB	AST	MPG	PPG	RPG	APG	Ref.
A.J. Pacher	帕奇爾	(United States)	C	Wright State	1	2024–2025	10	309:50	131	96	13	30:59	13.1	9.6	1.3	
Sir'Dominic Pointer	波因特	(United States)	G/F	St. John's	1	2022–2023	15	497:30	288	141	50	33:10	19.2	9.4	3.3	

=== S ===
Player	Name	Nat.	Pos.	From	Yrs	Seasons	Statistics									Ref.
Player	Name	Nat.	Pos.	From	Yrs	Seasons	GP	MP	PTS	REB	AST	MPG	PPG	RPG	APG	Ref.
Shih Cheng-Ping^{x}	史承平	(Taiwan)	SF	ISU	3	2024–present	20	77:17	28	13	2	3:51	1.4	0.7	0.1	

=== T ===
Player	Name	Nat.	Pos.	From	Yrs	Seasons	Statistics									Ref.
Player	Name	Nat.	Pos.	From	Yrs	Seasons	GP	MP	PTS	REB	AST	MPG	PPG	RPG	APG	Ref.
Trey Thompkins^{x}	湯普金斯	(United States)	PF	Georgia	1	2025–present	20	657:39	333	188	62	32:52	16.7	9.4	3.1	
Tien Lei	田壘	(Taiwan)	F/C	NTNU	3	2018–2021	36	364:19	132	72	21	10:07	3.7	2.0	0.6	
Ting Kuang-Hao	丁冠皓	(Taiwan)	F	UCH	1	2023–2024	10	19:09	4	3	1	1:55	0.4	0.3	0.1	
Jordan Tolbert	–	(United States)	F	Southern Methodist	1	2019–2020	8	267:52	101	74	5	33:29	12.6	9.3	0.6	
Tsai Cheng-Hsien	蔡政憲	(Taiwan)	C	MDU	2	2017–2019	21	110:02	28	31	5	5:14	1.3	1.5	0.2	
Anthony Tucker	塔克	(United States)	G	Minnesota	2	2019–2021	27	1109:33	683	197	174	41:05	25.3	7.3	6.4	

=== W ===
Player	Name	Nat.	Pos.	From	Yrs	Seasons	Statistics									Ref.
Player	Name	Nat.	Pos.	From	Yrs	Seasons	GP	MP	PTS	REB	AST	MPG	PPG	RPG	APG	Ref.
Randall Walko^{x}	忻沃克	(United States) (Taiwan)	SF	TCNJ	6	2020–2022; 2023–present	130	3412:09	1220	608	169	26:14	9.4	4.7	1.3	
Wang Chen-Yuan	王振原	(Taiwan)	PG	NCCU	4	2021–2025	28	134:43	38	13	12	4:48	1.4	0.5	0.4	
Wang Po-Chih	王柏智	(Taiwan)	C	NTSU	2	2019–2021	18	157:58	35	24	4	8:46	1.9	1.3	0.2	
Ryan Watkins	–	(United States)	C	Boise State	1	2019–2020	2	55:43	23	17	1	27:51	11.5	8.5	0.5	
Wu Chia-Chun^{x}	吳家駿	(Taiwan)	PG	NTSU	5	2022–present	120	1906:37	470	199	266	15:53	3.9	1.7	2.2	
Wu Sung-Wei	吳松蔚	(Taiwan)	G	ISU	7	2017–2024	83	972:18	439	100	38	11:42	5.3	1.2	0.5	
Wu Yung-Sheng	吳永盛	(Taiwan)	G	Sacramento State	3	2018–2019; 2021–2023	73	1686:24	468	203	169	23:06	6.4	2.8	2.3	

=== Y ===
Player	Name	Nat.	Pos.	From	Yrs	Seasons	Statistics									Ref.
Player	Name	Nat.	Pos.	From	Yrs	Seasons	GP	MP	PTS	REB	AST	MPG	PPG	RPG	APG	Ref.
Yang Chin-Min	楊敬敏	(Taiwan)	G/F	FJU	2	2019–2021	32	988:46	383	138	88	30:53	12.0	4.3	2.8	
Yang Shen-Yen	楊盛硯	(Taiwan)	G	NTSU	4	2020–2024	61	647:20	94	51	49	10:37	1.5	0.8	0.8	
Yang Tian-You	楊天佑	(Taiwan)	G	UKN	1	2017–2018	20	384:13	140	42	60	19:12	7.0	2.1	3.0	
Jerran Young	杰倫	(United States)	F	Wright State	2	2019–2021	33	1160:27	680	373	140	35:09	20.6	11.3	4.2	
