= List of Formosa Dreamers head coaches =

The Formosa Dreamers are a Taiwanese professional basketball team based in Taichung City, Taiwan. The team was formerly known as the Formosa Taishin Dreamers from 2020 to 2023. The team is owned by Formosa Basketball Development Corp. and coached by Douglas Creighton, with Han Chun-Kai as the general manager. The Dreamers won 0 ASEAN Basketball League championship, 0 P. League+ championship and 1 Taiwan Professional Basketball League championship since the team was founded in 2017.

There have been 6 head coaches for the Formosa Dreamers franchise. They haven't won any ASEAN Basketball League and P. League+ championship, but won their first Taiwan Professional Basketball League championship in the 2026 TPBL finals coached by Douglas Creighton.

== Coaches ==
=== Key ===
GC	Games coached
W	Wins
L	Losses
Win%	Winning percentage
#	Number of coaches

Note: Statistics are correct through the end of the 2025–26 TPBL season.

#	Name	Term	GC	W	L	Win%	GC	W	L	Win%	Achievements
#	Name	Term	Regular season				Playoffs				Achievements
Formosa Dreamers
1	Hsu Hao-Cheng	2017–2018	20	1	19	.050	–	–	–	–	
2	Dean Murray	2018–2019	26	19	7	.731	2	0	2	.000	2018–19 ABL Coach of the Year
3	Kyle Julius	2019–2020	14	8	6	.571	–	–	–	–	
Formosa Taishin Dreamers
—	Kyle Julius	2020–2023	67	34	33	.507	13	5	8	.385	
4	Lai Po-Lin	2023	27	14	13	.519	4	1	3	.250	
Formosa Dreamers
5	Jamie Pearlman	2023–2025	76	45	31	.592	11	3	8	.273	
6	Douglas Creighton	2025–present	36	22	14	.611	11	7	4	.636	1 TPBL championship (2026)
