= 2018–19 Formosa Dreamers season =

Taiwanese professional basketball season

Formosa Dreamers
2018-19 season
- President: Chang Cheng-Chung
- General Manager: Chang Hsien-Ming
- Head Coach: Dean Murray
- Arena: Changhua County Stadium
- ABL: 19-7(.571)
- Playoffs: Quarterfinals (lost to Vampire 0-2)
- Biggest win: Dreamers 107-79 Wolf Warriors (February 24, 2019)
- Biggest defeat: Dreamers 73-99 Knights (January 16, 2019)

The 2018–19 Formosa Dreamers season was the franchise's 2nd season, its second season in the ASEAN Basketball League (ABL), its 2nd in Changhua County. The Dreamers are coached by Dean Murray in his first year as head coach. The Dreamers play their home games at Changhua County Stadium.

== Standings ==
Team	GP	W	L	PCT
(Chinese Taipei) Formosa Dreamers	26	19	7	.731
(Philippines) San Miguel Alab Pilipinas	26	18	8	.692
Singapore Slingers	26	16	10	.615
CLS Knights Indonesia	26	15	11	.577
(Vietnam) Saigon Heat	26	14	12	.538
Macau Black Bears	26	14	12	.538
Hong Kong Eastern	26	13	13	.500
(Thailand) Mono Vampire	26	11	15	.423
Westports Malaysia Dragons	26	8	18	.308
(China) Zhuhai Wolf Warriors	26	2	24	.077

== Roster ==
Note: Flags indicate national team eligibility at FIBA-sanctioned events. Players may hold other non-FIBA nationalities not displayed.

2018-19 Formosa Dreamers roster
Players
Coaches

Pos.	No.	Nat.	Name	Ht.	Wt.	Age	From
F/C	1	(Chinese Taipei)	Tien Lei	2.03 m (6 ft 8 in)	103 kg (227 lb)	43 – 1 June 1983	NTNU
F	4	(Chinese Taipei)	Chen Hsiao-Jung	1.97 m (6 ft 6 in)	90 kg (198 lb)	36 – 30 May 1990	DLIT
G	5	(Chinese Taipei)	Chen Yu-Han	1.88 m (6 ft 2 in)	80 kg (176 lb)	32 – 14 December 1993	I-Shou
G	6	(Chinese Taipei)	Lee Hsueh-Lin	1.76 m (5 ft 9 in)	75 kg (165 lb)	42 – 31 January 1984	TPEC
F	7	(Chinese Taipei)	Chang Keng-Yu	1.88 m (6 ft 2 in)	85 kg (187 lb)	31 – 16 October 1995	NTUS
G	8	(Chinese Taipei)	Cheng Wei	1.80 m (5 ft 11 in)	88 kg (194 lb)	35 – 8 January 1991	USC
G	9	(Chinese Taipei)	Chen Shih-Nien	1.84 m (6 ft 0 in)	81 kg (179 lb)	42 – 8 April 1984	TPEC
G/F	10	(Chinese Taipei)	Chai Wei	1.91 m (6 ft 3 in)	78 kg (172 lb)	34 – 6 August 1992	TSU
G	14	(Chinese Taipei)	Wu Yung-Sheng	1.85 m (6 ft 1 in)	81 kg (179 lb)	30 – 19 October 1996	Sacramento State
G/F	23	(United States) (Chinese Taipei)	Kenneth Chien	1.85 m (6 ft 1 in)	86 kg (190 lb)	31 – 6 February 1995	Broward
G	30	(Chinese Taipei)	Wu Sung-Wei	1.82 m (6 ft 0 in)	80 kg (176 lb)	33 – 21 May 1993	I-Shou
C	31	(United States)	Will Artino (I)	2.11 m (6 ft 11 in)	100 kg (220 lb)	34 – 27 June 1992	Creighton
C	32	(Chinese Taipei)	Tsai Cheng-Hsien	1.97 m (6 ft 6 in)	97 kg (214 lb)	37 – 11 August 1989	MingDao
F	33	(United States)	Malcolm Miller (I)	2.01 m (6 ft 7 in)	95 kg (209 lb)	35 – 4 September 1991	Southern
F	40	(United States)	Tevin Glass (I)	2.03 m (6 ft 8 in)	100 kg (220 lb)	32 – 7 May 1994	East Tennessee State

Head coach

- (United States) Dean Murray

Assistant coach(es)

- (Chinese Taipei) Tsai Yao-Hsun
- (Chinese Taipei) Lai Po-Lin

Athletic trainer(s)

- (Chinese Taipei) Wang Yu-Chih

Team manager

- (Chinese Taipei) Lin Wu Cheng-Lin

Legend

- (C) Team captain
- (I) Import player
- Injured

== Game log ==
=== Summer Super 8 ===
==== Group stage ====
July 17

NLEX Road Warriors (Philippines)	94–68	(Chinese Taipei) Formosa Dreamers

Macau East Asian Games Dome, Cotai

July 18

Xinjiang Flying Tigers (China)	94–57	(Chinese Taipei) Formosa Dreamers

Macau East Asian Games Dome, Cotai

July 19

Formosa Dreamers (Chinese Taipei)	52–87	(South Korea) Incheon Electroland Elephants

Macau East Asian Games Dome, Cotai

=== Hualien Probation Basketball ===
==== Group stage ====
September 26

Team Thailand	80–94	Formosa Dreamers

Hualien County Stadium, Hualien County

September 27

Formosa Dreamers	63–62	Taiwan Beer

Hualien County Stadium, Hualien County

September 28

Formosa Dreamers	94–79	Team USA

Hualien County Stadium, Hualien County

September 29

Bank of Taiwan	77–93	Formosa Dreamers

Hualien County Stadium, Hualien County

==== Final ====
September 28

Formosa Dreamers	79–65	Hao Yu International Company

Hualien County Stadium, Hualien County

=== Regular season ===
2018–19 game log
Total: 19–7 (home: 11–2; road: 8–5)
November : 3–0 (Home: 0–0; Road: 3–0)

Game	Date	Team	Score	High points	High rebounds	High assists	Location Attendance	Record
1	November 18	@Slingers	W 77-73	Tevin Glass (24)	Will Artino (13)	Malcolm Miller (3)	OCBC Arena; 2,000	1–0
2	November 21	@Eastern	W 82-80	Glass, Miller (20)	Tevin Glass (10)	Chien, Miller (4)	Southorn Stadium	2–0
3	November 24	@Wolf Warriors	W 107-81	Malcolm Miller (22)	Will Artino (10)	Malcolm Miller (12)	Doumen Gymnasium	3–0

December : 3–2 (Home: 2–0; Road: 1–2)

Game	Date	Team	Score	High points	High rebounds	High assists	Location Attendance	Record
4	December 2	@Heat	W 86-85	Will Artino (29)	Will Artino (12)	Artino, Chen S., Lee (3)	CIS Arena	4–0
5	December 8	Eastern	W 81-71				Changhua County Stadium	5–0
6	December 9	Vampire	W 71-66	Will Artino (26)	Will Artino (19)	Malcolm Miller (7)	Changhua County Stadium	6–0
7	December 15	@Vampire	L 74-89	Malcolm Miller (27)	Tevin Glass (9)	Chen S., Miller (5)	Stadium 29	6–1
8	December 21	@Alab	L 72-86	Malcolm Miller (23)	Will Artino (12)	Malcolm Miller (7)	City of Santa Rosa Multi-Purpose Complex	6–2

January : 4–3 (Home: 2–1; Road: 2–2)

Game	Date	Team	Score	High points	High rebounds	High assists	Location Attendance	Record
9	January 5	Knights	W 82-72	Will Artino (24)	Tevin Glass (14)	Will Artino (5)	Changhua County Stadium	7–2
10	January 6	Slingers	L 80-88	Kenneth Chien (23)	Will Artino (13)	Kenneth Chien (4)	Changhua County Stadium	7–3
11	January 9	@Black Bears	L 110-116	Tevin Glass (43)	Chen Hsiao-Jung (9)	Malcolm Miller (8)	University of Macau Sports Complex	7–4
12	January 13	Alab	W 73-72	Tevin Glass (24)	Tevin Glass (9)	Lee Hsueh-Lin (7)	Changhua County Stadium	8–4
13	January 16	@Knights	L 73-99	Malcolm Miller (14)	Tevin Glass (12)	Cheng, Chien, Miller (3)	GOR Kertajaya Surabaya	8–5
14	January 20	@Eastern	W 92-86	Malcolm Miller (31)	Tevin Glass (11)	Tevin Glass (5)	Southorn Stadium	9–5
15	January 24	@Black Bears	W 122-116	Artino, Miller (34)	Artino, Miller (9)	Malcolm Miller (10)	University of Macau Sports Complex	10–5

February : 3–1 (Home: 3–1; Road: 0–0)

Game	Date	Team	Score	High points	High rebounds	High assists	Location Attendance	Record
16	February 16	Heat	L 72-74	Tevin Glass (20)	Will Artino (14)	Lee Hsueh-Lin (7)	Changhua County Stadium	10–6
17	February 17	Dragons	W 82-76	Tevin Glass (28)	Will Artino (12)	Will Artino (6)	Changhua County Stadium	11–6
18	February 23	Eastern	W 109-101	Will Artino (29)	Will Artino (12)	Artino, Chen S. (6)	Changhua County Stadium	12–6
19	February 24	Wolf Warriors	W 107-79	Tevin Glass (25)	Will Artino (12)	Malcolm Miller (15)	Changhua County Stadium	13–6

March : 6–1 (Home: 4–0; Road: 2–1)

Game	Date	Team	Score	High points	High rebounds	High assists	Location Attendance	Record
20	March 2	Black Bears	W 99-89	Malcolm Miller (30)	Tevin Glass (16)	Lee Hsueh-Lin (8)	Changhua County Stadium	14–6
21	March 3	Black Bears	W 94-84	Malcolm Miller (35)	Tevin Glass (14)	Chen Shih-Nien (7)	Changhua County Stadium	15–6
22	March 9	Wolf Warriors	W 97-78	Will Artino (30)	Will Artino (14)	Malcolm Miller (9)	Changhua County Stadium	16–6
23	March 10	Alab	W 79-71	Tevin Glass (27)	Glass, Miller (12)	Malcolm Miller (5)	Changhua County Stadium	17–6
24	March 17	@Alab	W 88-74	Malcolm Miller (27)	Will Artino (10)	Malcolm Miller (8)	City of Santa Rosa Multi-Purpose Complex	18–6
25	March 20	@Wolf Warriors	W 99-88	Tevin Glass (24)	Will Artino (14)	Malcolm Miller (11)	Shishan Gymnasium	19–6
26	March 24	@Dragons	L 96-97	Will Artino (27)	Tevin Glass (11)	Malcolm Miller (5)	MABA Stadium	19–7

2018–19 schedule

=== Playoffs ===
2019 playoff game log
Total: 0–2 (home: 0–1; road: 0–1)
Quarterfinals : 0–2 (Home: 0–1; Road: 0–1)

Game	Date	Team	Score	High points	High rebounds	High assists	Location Attendance	Series
1	March 31	Vampire	L 80–83				Changhua County Stadium	0–1
2	April 3	@Vampire	L 68–70				Stadium 29	0–2

2019 schedule

== Player statistics ==
Legend
GP	Games played	MPG	Minutes per game	FG%	Field goal percentage
3P%	3-point field goal percentage	FT%	Free throw percentage	RPG	Rebounds per game
APG	Assists per game	SPG	Steals per game	BPG	Blocks per game
PPG	Points per game		Led the league

Player	GP	MPG	PPG	FG%	3P%	FT%	RPG	APG	SPG	BPG
Will Artino	25	34.5	20.7	50.1%	23.0%	62.9%	10.7	3.1	1.7	1.5
Chai Wei	6	7.3	3.3	29.6%	23.5%	0.0%	0.7	0.0	0.2	0.0
Chang Keng-Yu	5	6.2	3.8	61.5%	40.0%	50.0%	1.0	1.0	0.4	0.0
Chen Hsiao-Jung	10	9.5	3.6	68.2%	50.0%	83.3%	2.8	3.0	0.3	0.5
Chen Shih-Nien	28	16.6	4.2	41.2%	32.1%	72.7%	1.3	2.7	0.7	0.0
Chen Yu-Han	Did not play									
Cheng Wei^{≠}	21	12.1	3.6	32.9%	29.4%	70.8%	1.3	1.2	0.4	0.0
Kenneth Chien	28	26.2	9.0	43.3%	37.3%	61.1%	3.0	1.9	1.2	0.3
Tevin Glass	28	34.7	20.3	47.3%	38.2%	80.5%	10.2	2.5	1.8	0.8
Lee Hsueh-Lin	23	24.2	2.4	39.3%	40.9%	75.0%	2.1	3.4	1.0	0.0
Malcolm Miller	27	37.2	21.8	46.3%	42.9%	78.3%	7.4	6.0	1.4	1.0
Tien Lei	21	9.2	2.7	28.8%	26.2%	58.3%	1.7	0.6	0.4	0.2
Tsai Cheng-Hsien	8	7.6	2.4	69.2%	0.0%	100.0%	2.0	0.3	0.0	0.3
Wu Sung-Wei	22	9.6	4.2	41.7%	45.0%	83.3%	1.1	0.4	0.4	0.0
Wu Yung-Sheng^{≠}	11	13.4	3.5	29.1%	13.3%	80.0%	1.8	1.6	0.6	0.1

- Reference：

^{≠} Acquired during the season

== Transactions ==
=== Overview ===
Players Added

Free agency

- Will Artino
- Jordan Bachynski
- Chang Keng-Yu
- Chen Hsiao-Jung
- Chen Shih-Nien
- Cheng Wei
- Tevin Glass
- Lee Hsueh-Lin
- Erron Maxey
- Malcolm Miller
- Tien Lei
- Wu Yung-Sheng
Players Lost

Free agency

- Ronnie Aguilar
- Charles Barratt
- Cheng Chi-Kuan
- Cheng Hao-Hsuan
- Chou Tzu-Hua
- Cameron Forte
- Li Chia-Ching
- Li Ping-Hung
- Luo Jun-Quan
- Pan Hsiang-Wei
- Yang Tian-You

Waived

- Jordan Bachynski
- Erron Maxey

=== Free Agency ===
==== Additions ====
Date	Player	Contract terms	Former team	Ref.
June 8, 2018	Chen Hsiao-Jung	—N/a	Fubon Braves	
June 15, 2018	Lee Hsueh-Lin	—N/a	(China) Xinjiang Flying Tigers	
July 3, 2018	Chen Shih-Nien	—N/a	Yulon Luxgen Dinos	
August 25, 2018	Erron Maxey	—N/a	Formosa Dreamers	
September 4, 2018	Jordan Bachynski	—N/a	(Spain) Obradoiro CAB	
September 4, 2018	Malcolm Miller	—N/a	(Canada) Saint John Riptide	
September 12, 2018	Tien Lei	1+1-year contract worth NT$12 million	(China) Tianjin Gold Lions	
September 14, 2018	Will Artino	—N/a	(Romania) CS Phoenix Galați	
September 21, 2018	Chang Keng-Yu	—N/a	NTUS	
October 6, 2018	Tevin Glass	—N/a	(Argentina) Asociación Mitre	
December 5, 2018	Cheng Wei	—N/a	(China) Beijing Bucks	
February 21, 2019	Wu Yung-Sheng	—N/a	(United States) Sacramento State Hornets	

==== Subtractions ====
Date	Player	Reason	New Team	Ref.
—N/a	Ronnie Aguilar	contract expired	(Bahrain) Al-Nweidrat	
June 24, 2018	Cameron Forte	contract expired	(Dominican Republic) Indios de San Francisco de Macorís	
July 9, 2018	Pan Hsiang-Wei	contract expired	Dacin Tigers	
July 28, 2018	Cheng Chi-Kuan	contract expired retirement	—N/a	
August 5, 2018	Chou Tzu-Hua	contract expired	TaiwanBeer HeroBears	
September 14, 2018	Jordan Bachynski	health issue replaced by Will Artino	—N/a	
September 24, 2018	Charles Barratt	contract expired retirement	—N/a	
September 27, 2018	Li Ping-Hung	contract expired	Fubon Braves	
September 27, 2018	Yang Tian-You	contract expired	Bank of Taiwan	
October 6, 2018	Erron Maxey	replaced by Tevin Glass	(United States) GIE Maile Matrix	
—N/a	Cheng Hao-Hsuan	—N/a	—N/a	
—N/a	Luo Jun-Quan	—N/a	—N/a	
—N/a	Li Chia-Ching	—N/a	—N/a	

== Awards ==
=== End-of-season awards ===
Recipient	Award	Ref.
Dean Murray	Coach of the Year	

=== Players of the Week ===
Week	Recipient	Date awarded	Ref.
Week 15	Malcolm Miller	—N/a	
