= Taichung Dreamers Academy =

- League: Absolute 3X3 Basketball
- Founded: 10 June 2020; 4 years ago
- Location: Taichung City
- President: Chen Li-Tsung
- Team manager: Chan Cheng-Hsing
- Affiliation(s): Formosa Dreamers
- Website: https://www.tcdreamersacademy.org/

The Taichung Dreamers Academy is a Taiwanese basketball team based in Taichung, Taiwan. The team is composed of amateur and student players. They competed in various basketball tournaments.

== History ==
The team is founded in 2020 by a group of Formosa Dreamers fans, whom had supported the Dreamers since the seasons they competed in the ASEAN Basketball League. The team held its first public tryout games on June 19 and 20, 2020 at Huizhong Basketball Court. On June 24, 2020, the team revealed the roster for their upcoming Guang-Sheng Basketball Cup games.

== Players ==
=== Current roster ===
Taichung Dreamers Academy roster
Players
Coaches

Pos.	No.	Nat.	Name	Ht.	Wt.	From
F		(Taiwan)	Chai Ya-Ching (W)	1.58 m (5 ft 2 in)	46 kg (101 lb)	CSMU
G		(Taiwan)	Chang Chieh-Cheng	1.82 m (6 ft 0 in)	73 kg (161 lb)	Fu Jen
F		(Taiwan)	Chen Chia-Chuan	1.88 m (6 ft 2 in)	88 kg (194 lb)	I-Shou
F		(Taiwan)	Chen Po-Jui	1.84 m (6 ft 0 in)	83 kg (183 lb)	OCU
C		(Taiwan)	Chen Ting-Lin	1.98 m (6 ft 6 in)	90 kg (198 lb)	I-Shou
C		(Taiwan)	Cheng Ming-Hsueh	2.05 m (6 ft 9 in)	92 kg (203 lb)	RCS
G		(Taiwan)	Chia Chun-Li	1.78 m (5 ft 10 in)	63 kg (139 lb)	NTNU
F		(Taiwan)	Hsieh Chih-Chi	1.85 m (6 ft 1 in)	85 kg (187 lb)	NTUS
G		(Taiwan)	Huang Yin-Yuan	1.78 m (5 ft 10 in)	65 kg (143 lb)	I-Shou
F		(Taiwan)	Ke Zhong-Kai	1.94 m (6 ft 4 in)	83 kg (183 lb)	I-Shou
C		(Taiwan)	Kuo Chun-Yan	1.98 m (6 ft 6 in)	90 kg (198 lb)	NTUS
F		(Taiwan)	Lee You-Qi	1.82 m (6 ft 0 in)	80 kg (176 lb)	I-Shou
F		(Taiwan)	Lee Yu	1.96 m (6 ft 5 in)	88 kg (194 lb)	OCU
G		(Taiwan)	Lin Jui-Hsuan	1.84 m (6 ft 0 in)	80 kg (176 lb)	NTSU
C		(Taiwan)	Liu Fang-Yu (W)	1.75 m (5 ft 9 in)	58 kg (128 lb)	NTNU
C		(Taiwan)	Lo Ting-Hsuan (W)	1.71 m (5 ft 7 in)	66 kg (146 lb)	NTCU
C		(Taiwan)	Luan Cheng-Wei	1.88 m (6 ft 2 in)	78 kg (172 lb)	I-Shou
F		(Taiwan)	Luo Kai-Hsiang	1.91 m (6 ft 3 in)	75 kg (165 lb)	NTUS
F		(Taiwan)	Pan Chi (W)	1.65 m (5 ft 5 in)	55 kg (121 lb)	NTUS
G		(Taiwan)	Shao Sheng-Hsi	1.82 m (6 ft 0 in)	74 kg (163 lb)	I-Shou
C		(Taiwan)	Tseng Hsin-Wu	1.95 m (6 ft 5 in)	90 kg (198 lb)	NTNU
F		(Taiwan)	Tzou Tzu-Hsi	1.90 m (6 ft 3 in)	85 kg (187 lb)	NCCU
C		(Taiwan)	Wang Cheng-Wen	1.91 m (6 ft 3 in)	83 kg (183 lb)	I-Shou
G		(Taiwan)	Wang Hsiao-Ching (W)	1.60 m (5 ft 3 in)	50 kg (110 lb)	NTUS
G		(Taiwan) (Vietnam)	Wei Peng-He	1.77 m (5 ft 10 in)	72 kg (159 lb)	NTNU
G		(Taiwan)	Wei Tzu-Yun	1.80 m (5 ft 11 in)	76 kg (168 lb)	NTUS
F		(Taiwan)	Wu Chung-Wei	1.92 m (6 ft 4 in)	75 kg (165 lb)	I-Shou
		(Taiwan)	Yang Chia-En (W)			Pu-Men HS
F		(Taiwan)	Yu Hsiang-Ping	1.88 m (6 ft 2 in)	76 kg (168 lb)	I-Shou

Coach

Legend

- (W) Women's Team player

Roster Updated: September 2, 2024

=== Former players who have ever joined professional team ===
Player	Nat.	Team(s)	Ref.
Sarr Bamba	(Senegal)	Yulon Luxgen Dinos (2020–2023)	
Chang Chia-Hsuan	(Taiwan)	Chunghwa Telecom (2024–present)	
Chang Keng-Yu	(Taiwan)	Formosa Dreamers (2018–2020); Taoyuan Pilots (2020–2021); Taipei Fubon Braves (2021–2023); Taipei Taishin Mars (2023–present)	
Chen Chih-Ying	(Taiwan)	Chunghwa Telecom (2023–present)	
Chen Pin-Chuan	(Taiwan)	Yulon Luxgen Dinos (2022–2023)	
Chi Sung-Yu	(Taiwan)	Formosa Taishin Dreamers (2019–2021)	
Chiang Shang-Chien	(Taiwan)	Changhua BLL (2022–present)	
Chiu Tzu-Hsuan	(Taiwan)	Kaohsiung Aquas (2022–present)	
Bayasgalan Delgerchuluun	(Mongolia)	Taichung Suns (2022–2023); Tainan TSG GhostHawks (2023–present)	
Sugar-Ochir Erdenetsetseg	(Mongolia)	Changhua BLL (2023–present)	
Lim Ting Xuan	(Malaysia)	MBC Kirin (2024–present)	
Lin Chun-Chi	(Taiwan)	Formosa Dreamers (2020–present)	
Lin Sin-Kuan	(Taiwan)	Taoyuan Taiwan Beer Leopards (2023–present)	
Liu Cheng-Yen	(Taiwan)	Kaohsiung 17LIVE Steelers (2023–present)	
Liu Chien-Ling	(Taiwan)	Cathay Bank (2024–present)	
Lu Wei-Ting	(Taiwan)	Kaohsiung Aquas (2021–present)	
Jonah Morrison	(Taiwan) (United Kingdom) (Republic of Ireland)	Formosa Taishin Dreamers (2020–2021); New Taipei CTBC DEA (2021–present)	
Pai Yao-Cheng	(Taiwan)	Taoyuan Pauian Pilots (2022–present)	
Pu Kuo-Lun	(Taiwan)	Yulon Luxgen Dinos (2024–present)	
Shen Jui-Yang	(Taiwan)	Bank of Taiwan (2022–2023)	
Shih Cheng-Ping	(Taiwan)	Formosa Dreamers (2024–present)	
Su Wen-Ju	(Taiwan)	Kaohsiung Aquas (2021–present)	
Tang Wei-Chieh	(Taiwan)	Kaohsiung Aquas (2023–present)	
Tseng Po-Yu	(Taiwan)	Kaohsiung Jeoutai Technology (2021–2022); Hsinchu Toplus Lioneers (2022–present)	
Wang Chia-Chang	(Taiwan)	Changhua BLL (2024–present)	
Wang Po-Chih	(Taiwan)	Formosa Taishin Dreamers (2019–2021); Kaohsiung 17LIVE Steelers (2021–2023); New Taipei Kings (2023–present)	
Wei Liang-Che	(Taiwan) (Vietnam)	Kaohsiung Aquas (2024–present)	
Weng Chia-Hung	(Taiwan)	Dacin Tigers (2016–2019); Yulon Luxgen Dinos (2020–present)	
Wu Yen-Lun	(Taiwan)	Suke Lion (2021–2022); Tainan TSG GhostHawks (2022–2024); Yulon Luxgen Dinos (2024–present)	
Matthew Yang	(United States) (Taiwan)	Kaohsiung 17LIVE Steelers (2021–2023); Changhua BLL (2023–2024)	

== Personnel ==
- President – Chen Li-Tsung
- Vice President/Representative – Chan Cheng-Hsing
- Director/Vice Representative – Lin Chi-Fu
- Director/Vice Representative – Wang Chi-Lun
- Director/Vice Representative – Hsu Ting-Jui
- Director – Tien Lei
- Director – Chen Yu-Hua
- Director – Lin Pang-Yen
- Director – Lin Sheng-Feng
- Supervisor – Lin Yi-Chien

Reference：

== Results ==
=== Summary ===
Year	Tournament	Team	Final result	Wins	Loses	WPCT	ref.
2020	Guang-Sheng Basketball Cup	Taichung Dreamers Academy	Champion	6	1	.857	
2020	Absolute 3x3 Basketball	Taichung Dreamers Academy	Third Place	23	1	.958	
2021	Absolute 3x3 Basketball	Taichung Dreamers Academy	Third Place	18	12	.600	
2022	Absolute 3x3 Basketball	Taichung Dreamers Academy	Quarterfinals	19	11	.633	
2022	3X3.EXE Premier 2022 Playoffs	Taichung Dreamers Academy	Quarterfinals	2	1	.667	
2023	Absolute 3x3 Basketball	Taichung Dreamers Academy	12th place	1	16	.059	
2023	Interleague Play	Taoyuan Pauian Pilots x Formosa Dreamers	6th place	0	5	.000	
2023	National 3x3 Basketball Challenge	Taichung Dreamers Academy A	Round of 16	3	1	.750	
2023	National 3x3 Basketball Challenge	Taichung Dreamers Academy B	Round of 16	3	1	.750	
2024	Absolute 3x3 Basketball	Taichung Dreamers Academy		1	12	.077	
2024	Absolute 3x3 Basketball	Changhua Dreamers Academy		8	7	.533	
2024	Absolute 3x3 Basketball	Taichung Dreamers Academy (W)		3	15	.167	
2024	Be Like Tiger 3x3	Taichung Dreamers Academy	Round of 12	5	1	.833	

=== Absolute 3x3 Basketball ===
Year	Team	Players	Conference	1	2	3	4	5	6	7	8	Final
2020	Taichung Dreamers Academy	Chen Pin-Chuan	South	Taipei; 1st	Taichung; 1st	Kaohsiung; 1st	Tainan; 1st	Kaohsiung; 1st	-	-	-	Taichung; Third Place
2020	Taichung Dreamers Academy	Chiu Tzu-Hsuan	South	Taipei; 1st	Taichung; 1st	Kaohsiung; 1st	Tainan; 1st	Kaohsiung; 1st	-	-	-	Taichung; Third Place
2020	Taichung Dreamers Academy	Lu Wei-Ting	South	Taipei; 1st	Taichung; 1st	Kaohsiung; 1st	Tainan; 1st	Kaohsiung; 1st	-	-	-	Taichung; Third Place
2020	Taichung Dreamers Academy	Pai Yao-Cheng	South	Taipei; 1st	Taichung; 1st	Kaohsiung; 1st	Tainan; 1st	Kaohsiung; 1st	-	-	-	Taichung; Third Place
2020	Taichung Dreamers Academy	Pu Kuo-Lun	South	Taipei; 1st	Taichung; 1st	Kaohsiung; 1st	Tainan; 1st	Kaohsiung; 1st	-	-	-	Taichung; Third Place
2020	Taichung Dreamers Academy	Su Wen-Ju	South	Taipei; 1st	Taichung; 1st	Kaohsiung; 1st	Tainan; 1st	Kaohsiung; 1st	-	-	-	Taichung; Third Place
2020	Taichung Dreamers Academy	Wu Yen-Lun	South	Taipei; 1st	Taichung; 1st	Kaohsiung; 1st	Tainan; 1st	Kaohsiung; 1st	-	-	-	Taichung; Third Place
2021	Taichung Dreamers Academy	Chen Pin-Chuan	South	Taipei; 1st	Taichung; 1st	Taichung; 1st	New Taipei; 4th	Tainan; 3rd	Kaohsiung; 4th	Kaohsiung; 3rd	Taichung; 3rd	Taichung; Third Place
2021	Taichung Dreamers Academy	Liu Chen-Yen	South	Taipei; 1st	Taichung; 1st	Taichung; 1st	New Taipei; 4th	Tainan; 3rd	Kaohsiung; 4th	Kaohsiung; 3rd	Taichung; 3rd	Taichung; Third Place
2021	Taichung Dreamers Academy	Liu Yi-Dao	South	Taipei; 1st	Taichung; 1st	Taichung; 1st	New Taipei; 4th	Tainan; 3rd	Kaohsiung; 4th	Kaohsiung; 3rd	Taichung; 3rd	Taichung; Third Place
2021	Taichung Dreamers Academy	Pai Yao-Cheng	South	Taipei; 1st	Taichung; 1st	Taichung; 1st	New Taipei; 4th	Tainan; 3rd	Kaohsiung; 4th	Kaohsiung; 3rd	Taichung; 3rd	Taichung; Third Place
2021	Taichung Dreamers Academy	Pu Guo-Lun	South	Taipei; 1st	Taichung; 1st	Taichung; 1st	New Taipei; 4th	Tainan; 3rd	Kaohsiung; 4th	Kaohsiung; 3rd	Taichung; 3rd	Taichung; Third Place
2021	Taichung Dreamers Academy	Su Wen-Ju	South	Taipei; 1st	Taichung; 1st	Taichung; 1st	New Taipei; 4th	Tainan; 3rd	Kaohsiung; 4th	Kaohsiung; 3rd	Taichung; 3rd	Taichung; Third Place
2021	Taichung Dreamers Academy	Tai Wei	South	Taipei; 1st	Taichung; 1st	Taichung; 1st	New Taipei; 4th	Tainan; 3rd	Kaohsiung; 4th	Kaohsiung; 3rd	Taichung; 3rd	Taichung; Third Place
2021	Taichung Dreamers Academy	Tseng Ming-Wei	South	Taipei; 1st	Taichung; 1st	Taichung; 1st	New Taipei; 4th	Tainan; 3rd	Kaohsiung; 4th	Kaohsiung; 3rd	Taichung; 3rd	Taichung; Third Place
2021	Taichung Dreamers Academy	Yu Xiang-Pin	South	Taipei; 1st	Taichung; 1st	Taichung; 1st	New Taipei; 4th	Tainan; 3rd	Kaohsiung; 4th	Kaohsiung; 3rd	Taichung; 3rd	Taichung; Third Place
2022	Taichung Dreamers Academy	Chen Ting-Lin	North	Taichung; 3rd	Taipei; 4th	Taoyuan; 5th	Taichung; 2nd	New Taipei; 1st	Yilan; 1st	Kaohsiung; 3rd	Keelung; 3rd	Taichung; Quarterfinals
2022	Taichung Dreamers Academy	Hsu Chun-Wei	North	Taichung; 3rd	Taipei; 4th	Taoyuan; 5th	Taichung; 2nd	New Taipei; 1st	Yilan; 1st	Kaohsiung; 3rd	Keelung; 3rd	Taichung; Quarterfinals
2022	Taichung Dreamers Academy	Ke Zhong-Kai	North	Taichung; 3rd	Taipei; 4th	Taoyuan; 5th	Taichung; 2nd	New Taipei; 1st	Yilan; 1st	Kaohsiung; 3rd	Keelung; 3rd	Taichung; Quarterfinals
2022	Taichung Dreamers Academy	Liu Yi-Dao	North	Taichung; 3rd	Taipei; 4th	Taoyuan; 5th	Taichung; 2nd	New Taipei; 1st	Yilan; 1st	Kaohsiung; 3rd	Keelung; 3rd	Taichung; Quarterfinals
2022	Taichung Dreamers Academy	Tai Wei	North	Taichung; 3rd	Taipei; 4th	Taoyuan; 5th	Taichung; 2nd	New Taipei; 1st	Yilan; 1st	Kaohsiung; 3rd	Keelung; 3rd	Taichung; Quarterfinals
2022	Taichung Dreamers Academy	Tseng Ming-Wei	North	Taichung; 3rd	Taipei; 4th	Taoyuan; 5th	Taichung; 2nd	New Taipei; 1st	Yilan; 1st	Kaohsiung; 3rd	Keelung; 3rd	Taichung; Quarterfinals
2022	Taichung Dreamers Academy	Wang Cheng-Wen	North	Taichung; 3rd	Taipei; 4th	Taoyuan; 5th	Taichung; 2nd	New Taipei; 1st	Yilan; 1st	Kaohsiung; 3rd	Keelung; 3rd	Taichung; Quarterfinals
2022	Taichung Dreamers Academy	Yu Xiang-Pin	North	Taichung; 3rd	Taipei; 4th	Taoyuan; 5th	Taichung; 2nd	New Taipei; 1st	Yilan; 1st	Kaohsiung; 3rd	Keelung; 3rd	Taichung; Quarterfinals
2023	Taichung Dreamers Academy	Chen Chia-Chuan	-	Pingtung; 12th	Taichung; 11th	Kaohsiung; 6th	Taipei; 10th	Tainan; 11th	New Taipei; 11th	Taoyuan; 10th	Taichung; 10th	Not held
2023	Taichung Dreamers Academy	Ke Zhong-Kai	-	Pingtung; 12th	Taichung; 11th	Kaohsiung; 6th	Taipei; 10th	Tainan; 11th	New Taipei; 11th	Taoyuan; 10th	Taichung; 10th	Not held
2023	Taichung Dreamers Academy	Lee You-Qi	-	Pingtung; 12th	Taichung; 11th	Kaohsiung; 6th	Taipei; 10th	Tainan; 11th	New Taipei; 11th	Taoyuan; 10th	Taichung; 10th	Not held
2023	Taichung Dreamers Academy	Lin Ting-Hsuan	-	Pingtung; 12th	Taichung; 11th	Kaohsiung; 6th	Taipei; 10th	Tainan; 11th	New Taipei; 11th	Taoyuan; 10th	Taichung; 10th	Not held
2023	Taichung Dreamers Academy	Shao Sheng-Hsi	-	Pingtung; 12th	Taichung; 11th	Kaohsiung; 6th	Taipei; 10th	Tainan; 11th	New Taipei; 11th	Taoyuan; 10th	Taichung; 10th	Not held
2023	Taichung Dreamers Academy	Tseng Ming-Wei	-	Pingtung; 12th	Taichung; 11th	Kaohsiung; 6th	Taipei; 10th	Tainan; 11th	New Taipei; 11th	Taoyuan; 10th	Taichung; 10th	Not held
2024	Taichung Dreamers Academy	Chang Chieh-Cheng	-	Taichung; 11th	Taoyuan; 10th	Hualien; 8th	Kaohsiung	Taipei; 11th	Tainan; 10th	New Taipei; 11th	Kaohsiung	Taichung
2024	Taichung Dreamers Academy	Chen Po-Jui	-	Taichung; 11th	Taoyuan; 10th	Hualien; 8th	Kaohsiung	Taipei; 11th	Tainan; 10th	New Taipei; 11th	Kaohsiung	Taichung
2024	Taichung Dreamers Academy	Chia Chun-Li	-	Taichung; 11th	Taoyuan; 10th	Hualien; 8th	Kaohsiung	Taipei; 11th	Tainan; 10th	New Taipei; 11th	Kaohsiung	Taichung
2024	Taichung Dreamers Academy	Lin Jui-Hsuan	-	Taichung; 11th	Taoyuan; 10th	Hualien; 8th	Kaohsiung	Taipei; 11th	Tainan; 10th	New Taipei; 11th	Kaohsiung	Taichung
2024	Taichung Dreamers Academy	Luo Kai-Hsiang	-	Taichung; 11th	Taoyuan; 10th	Hualien; 8th	Kaohsiung	Taipei; 11th	Tainan; 10th	New Taipei; 11th	Kaohsiung	Taichung
2024	Taichung Dreamers Academy	Tzou Tzu-Hsi	-	Taichung; 11th	Taoyuan; 10th	Hualien; 8th	Kaohsiung	Taipei; 11th	Tainan; 10th	New Taipei; 11th	Kaohsiung	Taichung
2024	Changhua Dreamers Academy	Hsieh Chih-Chi	-	Taichung; 10th	Taoyuan; 11th	Hualien; 9th	Kaohsiung; 9th	Taipei; 9th	Tainan; DNP	New Taipei; 1st	Kaohsiung	Taichung
2024	Changhua Dreamers Academy	Huang Yin-Yuan	-	Taichung; 10th	Taoyuan; 11th	Hualien; 9th	Kaohsiung; 9th	Taipei; 9th	Tainan; DNP	New Taipei; 1st	Kaohsiung	Taichung
2024	Changhua Dreamers Academy	Ke Zhong-Kai	-	Taichung; 10th	Taoyuan; 11th	Hualien; 9th	Kaohsiung; 9th	Taipei; 9th	Tainan; DNP	New Taipei; 1st	Kaohsiung	Taichung
2024	Changhua Dreamers Academy	Luan Cheng-Wei	-	Taichung; 10th	Taoyuan; 11th	Hualien; 9th	Kaohsiung; 9th	Taipei; 9th	Tainan; DNP	New Taipei; 1st	Kaohsiung	Taichung
2024	Changhua Dreamers Academy	Shao Sheng-Hsi	-	Taichung; 10th	Taoyuan; 11th	Hualien; 9th	Kaohsiung; 9th	Taipei; 9th	Tainan; DNP	New Taipei; 1st	Kaohsiung	Taichung
2024	Changhua Dreamers Academy	Tseng Ming-Wei	-	Taichung; 10th	Taoyuan; 11th	Hualien; 9th	Kaohsiung; 9th	Taipei; 9th	Tainan; DNP	New Taipei; 1st	Kaohsiung	Taichung
2024	Changhua Dreamers Academy	Wu Chung-Wei	-	Taichung; 10th	Taoyuan; 11th	Hualien; 9th	Kaohsiung; 9th	Taipei; 9th	Tainan; DNP	New Taipei; 1st	Kaohsiung	Taichung
2024	Taichung Dreamers Academy (W)	Chai Ya-Ching	-	Taichung; 5th	Taoyuan; 4th	Hualien; 4th	Kaohsiung	Taipei	Tainan; 8th	New Taipei; 9th	Kaohsiung	Taichung
2024	Taichung Dreamers Academy (W)	Chang Chia-Hsuan	-	Taichung; 5th	Taoyuan; 4th	Hualien; 4th	Kaohsiung	Taipei	Tainan; 8th	New Taipei; 9th	Kaohsiung	Taichung
2024	Taichung Dreamers Academy (W)	Liu Chien-Ling	-	Taichung; 5th	Taoyuan; 4th	Hualien; 4th	Kaohsiung	Taipei	Tainan; 8th	New Taipei; 9th	Kaohsiung	Taichung
2024	Taichung Dreamers Academy (W)	Liu Fang-Yu	-	Taichung; 5th	Taoyuan; 4th	Hualien; 4th	Kaohsiung	Taipei	Tainan; 8th	New Taipei; 9th	Kaohsiung	Taichung
2024	Taichung Dreamers Academy (W)	Liu Ying-Chun	-	Taichung; 5th	Taoyuan; 4th	Hualien; 4th	Kaohsiung	Taipei	Tainan; 8th	New Taipei; 9th	Kaohsiung	Taichung
2024	Taichung Dreamers Academy (W)	Lo Ting-Hsuan	-	Taichung; 5th	Taoyuan; 4th	Hualien; 4th	Kaohsiung	Taipei	Tainan; 8th	New Taipei; 9th	Kaohsiung	Taichung
2024	Taichung Dreamers Academy (W)	Pan Chi	-	Taichung; 5th	Taoyuan; 4th	Hualien; 4th	Kaohsiung	Taipei	Tainan; 8th	New Taipei; 9th	Kaohsiung	Taichung
2024	Taichung Dreamers Academy (W)	Wang Hsiao-Ching	-	Taichung; 5th	Taoyuan; 4th	Hualien; 4th	Kaohsiung	Taipei	Tainan; 8th	New Taipei; 9th	Kaohsiung	Taichung
2024	Taichung Dreamers Academy (W)	Yang Chia-En	-	Taichung; 5th	Taoyuan; 4th	Hualien; 4th	Kaohsiung	Taipei	Tainan; 8th	New Taipei; 9th	Kaohsiung	Taichung
