= 2017–18 Formosa Dreamers season =

Taiwanese professional basketball season

Formosa Dreamers
2017-18 season
- President: Chang Cheng-Chung
- General Manager: Chang Hsien-Ming
- Head Coach: Hsu Hao-Cheng
- Arena: Changhua County Stadium
- ABL: 1-19(.050)
- Biggest win: Dreamers 80-75 Heat (December 9, 2017)
- Biggest defeat: Dreamers 74-105 Knights (January 28, 2018)

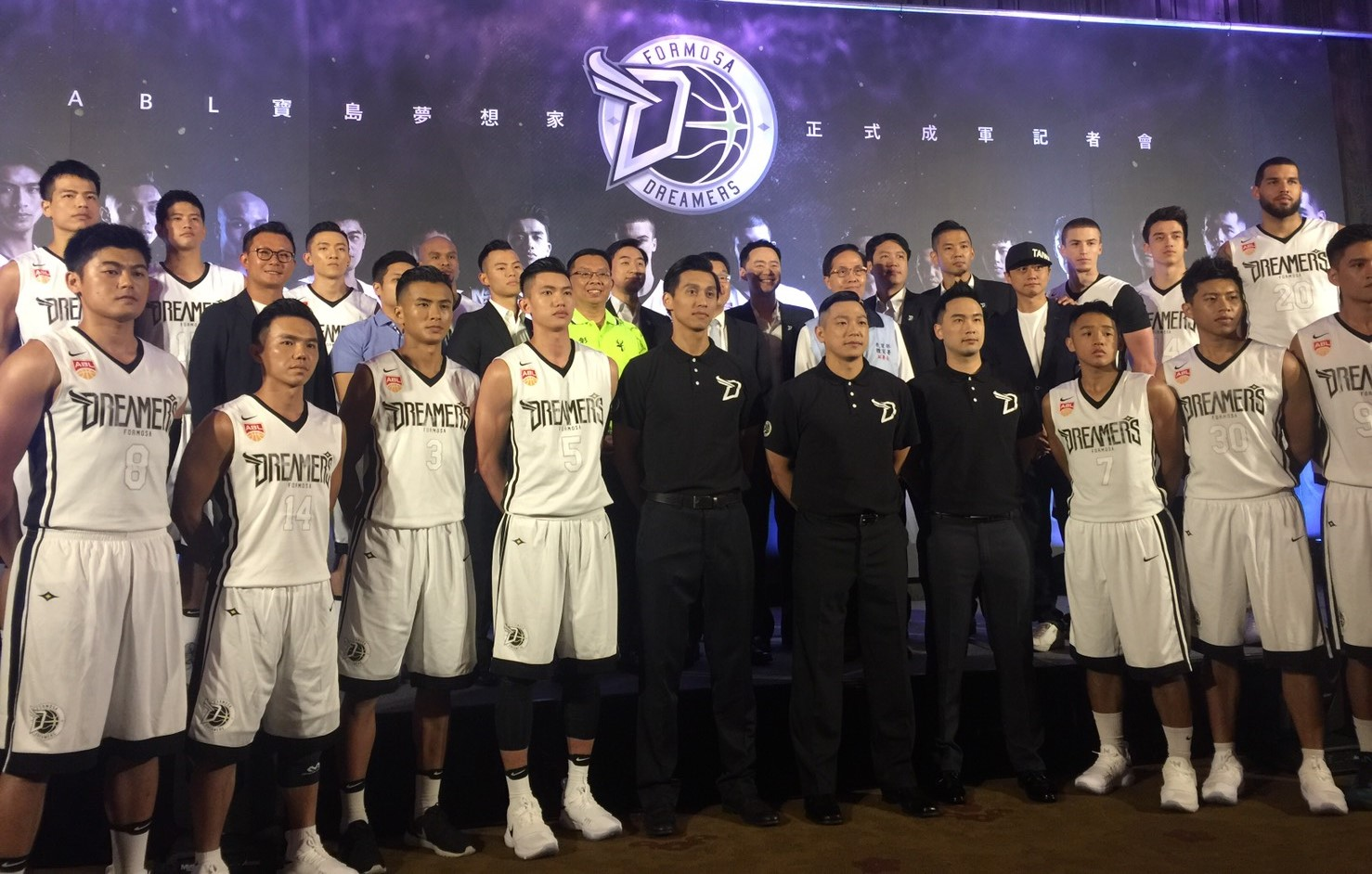

The 2017–18 Formosa Dreamers season was the franchise's 1st season, its first season in the ASEAN Basketball League (ABL), its 1st in Changhua County. The Dreamers are coached by Hsu Hao-Cheng in his first year as head coach. The Dreamers play their home games at Changhua County Stadium.

== Standings ==
Team	GP	W	L	PCT
(China) Chong Son Kung Fu	20	15	5	.750
Hong Kong Eastern	20	14	6	.700
(Philippines) San Miguel Alab Pilipinas	20	14	6	.700
(Thailand) Mono Vampire	20	14	6	.700
Singapore Slingers	20	12	8	.600
(Vietnam) Saigon Heat	20	10	10	.500
CLS Knights Indonesia	20	5	15	.250
Westports Malaysia Dragons	20	5	15	.250
(Chinese Taipei) Formosa Dreamers	20	1	19	.050

== Roster ==
Note: Flags indicate national team eligibility at FIBA-sanctioned events. Players may hold other non-FIBA nationalities not displayed.

2017-18 Formosa Dreamers roster
Players
Coaches

Pos.	No.	Nat.	Name	Ht.	Wt.	Age	From
G	1	(Chinese Taipei)	Cheng Chi-Kuan	1.88 m (6 ft 2 in)	88 kg (194 lb)	31 – 28 January 1994	SHU
F	2	(Chinese Taipei)	Pan Hsiang-Wei	1.90 m (6 ft 3 in)	80 kg (176 lb)	30 – 26 October 1994	I-Shou
G	3	(Chinese Taipei)	Li Ping-Hung (C)	1.83 m (6 ft 0 in)	80 kg (176 lb)	35 – 3 November 1989	NTNU
G	5	(Chinese Taipei)	Chen Yu-Han	1.88 m (6 ft 2 in)	80 kg (176 lb)	31 – 14 December 1993	I-Shou
C	6	(Chinese Taipei)	Ronnie Aguilar (WI)	2.16 m (7 ft 1 in)	110 kg (243 lb)	37 – 24 June 1987	Cal State Dominguez Hills
G	7	(Chinese Taipei)	Yang Tian-You	1.70 m (5 ft 7 in)	75 kg (165 lb)	31 – 24 September 1993	UKN
G	8	(Chinese Taipei)	Cheng Hao-Hsuan	1.83 m (6 ft 0 in)	78 kg (172 lb)	35 – 20 March 1989	NDHU
G/F	10	(Chinese Taipei)	Chai Wei	1.91 m (6 ft 3 in)	78 kg (172 lb)	32 – 6 August 1992	TSU
G	13	(Chinese Taipei)	Chou Tzu-Hua	1.83 m (6 ft 0 in)	92 kg (203 lb)	37 – 4 October 1987	Fu Jen
G	14	(Chinese Taipei)	Luo Jun-Quan	1.68 m (5 ft 6 in)	75 kg (165 lb)	33 – 14 January 1992	OCU
F	15	(Chinese Taipei)	Li Chia-Ching	1.93 m (6 ft 4 in)	100 kg (220 lb)	33 – 11 January 1992	Fu Jen
G/F	23	(United States) (Chinese Taipei)	Kenneth Chien (AI)	1.85 m (6 ft 1 in)	86 kg (190 lb)	30 – 6 February 1995	Broward
F	26	(Chinese Taipei)	Cameron Forte (WI)	2.01 m (6 ft 7 in)	100 kg (220 lb)	32 – 6 February 1993	Portland State
G	30	(Chinese Taipei)	Wu Sung-Wei	1.82 m (6 ft 0 in)	80 kg (176 lb)	31 – 21 May 1993	I-Shou
C	32	(Chinese Taipei)	Tsai Cheng-Hsien	1.97 m (6 ft 6 in)	97 kg (214 lb)	35 – 11 August 1989	MingDao
G/F	44	(Chinese Taipei) (United Kingdom)	Charles Barratt	1.93 m (6 ft 4 in)	86 kg (190 lb)	29 – 13 December 1995	RHUL

Head coach

- (Chinese Taipei) Hsu Hao-Cheng

Assistant coach(es)

- (Chinese Taipei) Tsai Yao-Hsun
- (Chinese Taipei) Lai Po-Lin

Athletic trainer(s)

- (Chinese Taipei) Wang Yu-Chih

Legend

- (C) Team captain
- (WI) World import
- (AI) ASEAN heritage import
- Injured

== Game log ==
=== Regular season ===
2017–18 game log
Total: 1–19 (Home: 0–10; Road: 1–9)
November : 0–2 (Home: 0–0; Road: 0–2)

Game	Date	Team	Score	High points	High rebounds	High assists	Location Attendance	Record
1	November 18	@Knights	L 73-94	Jaleel Cousins (22)	Jaleel Cousins (15)	Lenny Daniel (3)	GOR Kertajaya Surabaya	0-1
2	November 24	@Kung Fu	L 59-86	Lenny Daniel (18)	Lenny Daniel (15)	James Forrester (4)	Nanhai Gymnasium	0-2

December : 1–2 (Home: 0–2; Road: 1–0)

Game	Date	Team	Score	High points	High rebounds	High assists	Location Attendance	Record
3	December 9	@Heat	W 80-75	Lenny Daniel (22)	Lenny Daniel (19)	Cheng Chi-Kuan (3)	CIS Arena	1-2
4	December 16	Alab	L 61-78	Lenny Daniel (19)	Jaleel Cousins (9)	Chou Tzu-Hua (3)	Changhua County Stadium	1-3
5	December 17	Eastern	L 97-120	Lenny Daniel (18)	Lenny Daniel (11)	Chou Tzu-Hua (6)	Changhua County Stadium	1-4

January : 0–7 (Home: 0–4; Road: 0–3)

Game	Date	Team	Score	High points	High rebounds	High assists	Location Attendance	Record
6	January 6	Heat	L 85-99	Wu Sung-Wei (21)	Chukwunike Okosa (10)	Lenny Daniel (5)	Changhua County Stadium	1-5
7	January 7	Vampire	L 84-104	Chen Yu-Han (18)	Lenny Daniel (8)	Yang Tian-You (5)	Changhua County Stadium	1-6
8	January 14	@Dragons	L 74-84	Ronnie Aguilar (22)	Ronnie Aguilar (22)	Chou Tzu-Hua (4)	MABA Stadium	1-7
9	January 18	@Eastern	L 79-99	Lenny Daniel (19)	Ronnie Aguilar (16)	Yang Tian-You (6)	Southorn Stadium	1-8
10	January 24	@Vampire	L 85-93	Lenny Daniel (32)	Lenny Daniel (14)	Chou Tzu-Hua (5)	Stadium 29	1-9
11	January 27	Kung Fu	L 77-88	Ronnie Aguilar (23)	Ronnie Aguilar (12)	Lenny Daniel (5)	Changhua County Stadium	1-10
12	January 28	Knights	L 74-105	Wu Sung-Wei (22)	Lenny Daniel (10)	Li Ping-Hung (3)	Changhua County Stadium	1-11

February : 0–5 (Home: 0–2; Road: 0–3)

Game	Date	Team	Score	High points	High rebounds	High assists	Location Attendance	Record
13	February 3	@Kung Fu	L 79-108	Erron Maxey (34)	Erron Maxey (13)	Chou Tzu-Hua (6)	Nanhai Gymnasium	1-12
14	February 11	@Slingers	L 65-72	Cameron Forte (26)	Cameron Forte (16)	Yang Tian-You (4)	OCBC Arena	1-13
15	February 18	@Alab	L 93-117	Cameron Forte (29)	Cameron Forte (21)	Chou Tzu-Hua (5)	City of Santa Rosa Multi-Purpose Complex	1-14
16	February 24	Eastern	L 91-93	Cameron Forte (31)	Ronnie Aguilar (13)	Yang Tian-You (5)	Changhua County Stadium	1-15
17	February 25	Dragons	L 92-95	Cameron Forte (42)	Cameron Forte (25)	Cameron Forte (5)	Changhua County Stadium	1-16

March : 0–3 (Home: 0–2; Road: 0–1)

Game	Date	Team	Score	High points	High rebounds	High assists	Location Attendance	Record
18	March 17	Kung Fu	L 83-105	Cameron Forte (33)	Cameron Forte (14)	Chien, Forte (2)	Changhua County Stadium	1-17
19	March 18	Slingers	L 69-87	Cameron Forte (20)	Cameron Forte (12)	Cameron Forte (4)	Changhua County Stadium	1-18
20	March 22	@Eastern	L 93-99	Yang Tian-You (25)	Cameron Forte (15)	Yang Tian-You (6)	Southorn Stadium	1-19

2017–18 schedule

== Player statistics ==
Legend
GP	Games played	MPG	Minutes per game	2P%	2-point field goal percentage
3P%	3-point field goal percentage	FT%	Free throw percentage	RPG	Rebounds per game
APG	Assists per game	SPG	Steals per game	BPG	Blocks per game
PPG	Points per game		Led the league

Player	GP	MPG	PPG	2P%	3P%	FT%	RPG	APG	SPG	BPG
Ronnie Aguilar^{≠}	12	30.6	16.7	43.9%	0.0%	64.3%	11.9	1.5	0.6	1.3
Charles Barratt	15	6.1	1.9	40.0%	20.0%	63.6%	1.0	0.1	0.2	0.0
Chai Wei	13	16.0	4.5	33.3%	35.9%	75.0%	1.2	0.5	0.2	0.4
Chen Yu-Han	20	23.7	9.0	42.7%	25.0%	71.1%	2.2	1.7	0.9	0.1
Cheng Chi-Kuan	15	14.7	3.5	37.5%	16.3%	53.8%	1.9	0.7	0.3	0.1
Cheng Hao-Hsuan	1	9.0	0.0	0.0%	0.0%	0.0%	2.0	1.0	1.0	0.0
Kenneth Chien^{≠}	8	17.4	6.1	45.7%	30.8%	45.5%	1.5	1.0	0.8	0.1
Chou Tzu-Hua^{≠}	12	21.7	3.2	40.0%	18.5%	58.3%	2.3	2.9	0.5	0.0
Jaleel Cousins^{‡}	5	27.6	14.8	46.7%	0.0%	64.3%	12.4	0.6	0.6	1.2
Lenny Daniel^{‡}	12	34.3	18.1	46.9%	25.0%	54.0%	11.0	2.6	0.5	1.3
James Forrester^{‡}	2	26.0	9.0	45.5%	16.7%	62.5%	3.5	2.0	1.5	0.5
Cameron Forte^{≠}	7	38.9	29.3	59.7%	0.0%	57.9%	16.1	4.4	2.0	1.0
Lai Po-Lin^{≠‡}	1	1.0	0.0	0.0%	0.0%	0.0%	0.0	0.0	0.0	0.0
Li Chia-Ching	18	8.8	2.3	54.5%	0.0%	54.5%	1.3	0.6	0.2	0.5
Li Ping-Hung	12	14.0	1.6	23.5%	7.7%	72.7%	1.3	1.7	0.9	0.1
Luo Jun-Quan	5	9.6	1.4	30.0%	0.0%	50.0%	0.8	1.2	0.8	0.0
Erron Maxey^{≠‡}	1	36.0	34.0	51.9%	0.0%	66.7%	13.0	2.0	1.0	1.0
Chukwunike Okosa^{≠‡}	2	24.5	10.0	34.8%	20.0%	50.0%	8.5	2.0	0.0	1.0
Pan Hsiang-Wei	Did not play									
Tsai Cheng-Hsien	12	4.4	0.8	40.0%	0.0%	11.1%	1.5	0.3	0.1	0.2
Wu Sung-Wei	17	22.7	11.9	60.9%	50.0%	80.0%	2.1	1.2	1.5	0.2
Yang Tian-You	19	19.8	7.4	38.6%	37.8%	63.6%	2.2	3.2	0.6	0.1

- Reference：

^{‡} Waived during the season
^{≠} Acquired during the season

== Transactions ==
=== Overview ===
Players Added

Free agency

- Ronnie Aguilar
- Waverly Austin
- Charles Barratt
- Chai Wei
- Chen Yu-Han
- Cheng Chi-Kuan
- Cheng Hao-Hsuan
- Kenneth Chien
- Chou Tzu-Hua
- Jaleel Cousins
- Lenny Daniel
- James Forrester
- Cameron Forte
- Hsu Hao-Chun
- Li Chia-Ching
- Li Ping-Hung
- Luo Jun-Quan
- Erron Maxey
- Arron Mollet
- Chukwunike Okosa
- Pan Hsiang-Wei
- Tsai Cheng-Hsien
- Wu Sung-Wei
- Yang Tian-You
Players Lost

Waived

- Waverly Austin
- Jaleel Cousins
- Lenny Daniel
- James Forrester
- Hsu Hao-Chun
- Erron Maxey
- Arron Mollet
- Chukwunike Okosa

=== Free Agency ===
==== Additions ====
Date	Player	Contract terms	Former team	Ref.
October 11, 2017	Waverly Austin	—	(Germany) Eisbären Bremerhaven	
October 11, 2017	Charles Barratt	—	(United Kingdom) RHUL	
October 11, 2017	Chai Wei	—	Fubon Braves	
October 11, 2017	Chen Yu-Han	—	ISU 137	
October 11, 2017	Cheng Chi-Kuan	—	Kinmen Kaoliang Liquor	
October 11, 2017	Cheng Hao-Hsuan	—	Bank of Taiwan	
October 11, 2017	James Forrester	—	(Philippines) GlobalPort Batang Pier	
October 11, 2017	Hsu Hao-Chun	—	ISU 137	
October 11, 2017	Li Chia-Ching	—	Kinmen Kaoliang Liquor	
October 11, 2017	Li Ping-Hung	—	Kinmen Kaoliang Liquor	
October 11, 2017	Luo Jun-Quan	—	Kaohsiung Truth	
October 11, 2017	Arron Mollet	—	(United States) Santa Cruz Warriors	
October 11, 2017	Pan Hsiang-Wei	—	ISU 137	
October 11, 2017	Tsai Cheng-Hsien	—	Fubon Braves	
October 11, 2017	Wu Sung-Wei	—	ISU 137	
October 11, 2017	Yang Tian-You	—	UKN	
November 13, 2017	Jaleel Cousins	—	(United States) Reno Bighorns	
November 13, 2017	Lenny Daniel	—	(Vietnam) Saigon Heat	
December 18, 2017	Chou Tzu-Hua	—	(China) Guizhou Shenghang Snow Leopards	
December 22, 2017	Chukwunike Okosa	—	(Philippines) Tanduay Alab Pilipinas	
January 13, 2018	Ronnie Aguilar	—	(United States) Grand Rapids Drive	
February 2, 2018	Erron Maxey	—	(United States) GIE Maile Matrix	
February 2, 2018	Kenneth Chien	—	(United States) Sunrise Jewels	
February 10, 2018	Cameron Forte	—	(Iceland) Keflavík	

==== Subtractions ====
Date	Player	Reason	New Team	Ref.
—	Hsu Hao-Chun	not in opening roster	—	
November 13, 2017	Waverly Austin	replaced by Lenny Daniel and Jaleel Cousins	(Czech Republic) ČEZ Nymburk	
November 13, 2017	Arron Mollet	replaced by Lenny Daniel and Jaleel Cousins	—	
December 7, 2017	James Forrester	season ending injury	(Philippines) Davao Occidental Tigers	
December 22, 2017	Jaleel Cousins	replaced by Chukwunike Okosa	(United States) Santa Cruz Warriors	
January 12, 2018	Chukwunike Okosa	replaced by Ronnie Aguilar	—	
February 3, 2018	Lenny Daniel	injury replaced by Erron Maxey	(Qatar) Al-Rayyan	
February 5, 2018	Erron Maxey	replaced by Cameron Forte	Formosa Dreamers	

== Awards ==
=== Players of the Week ===
==== Local players ====
Week	Recipient	Date awarded	Ref.
Week 4	Yang Tian-You	December 4–December 10	

==== World imports ====
Week	Recipient	Date awarded	Ref.
Week 4	Lenny Daniel	December 4–December 10	
