= Artistic roller skating at the 2009 World Games – Women's singles =

Artistic roller skating - women's singles at the 2009 World Games
- Venue: I-Shou University Gymnasium, Kaohsiung, Taiwan
- Dates: 21–22 July 2009
- Competitors: 6 from 6 nations

Medalists
gold medal	(Italy) Tanja Romano
silver medal	(Slovenia) Nika Arčon
bronze medal	(Germany) Monika Lis

The women's singles competition in artistic roller skating at the 2009 World Games took place from 21 to 22 July 2009 at the I-Shou University Gymnasium in Kaohsiung, Taiwan.

== Competition format ==
A total of 6 skaters entered the competition. Short program and long program were held.

== Results ==
Rank	Skater	Nation	Short program	Long program
1st place, gold medalist(s)	Tanja Romano	Italy	95.7	384.0
2nd place, silver medalist(s)	Nika Arčon	Slovenia	88.2	343.2
3rd place, bronze medalist(s)	Monika Lis	Germany	81.0	342.3
4	Wang Hsiao-chu	Chinese Taipei	77.5	319.9
5	Lindsay Mann	United States	80.4	313.8
6	Sarah-Jane Jones	New Zealand	75.8	305.9
