= 2019–20 Formosa Dreamers season =

Taiwanese professional basketball season

Formosa Dreamers
2019-20 season
- President: Chang Cheng-Chung
- General Manager: Chang Hsien-Ming
- Head Coach: Kyle Julius
- Arena: Changhua County Stadium
- ABL: 8-6(.571)
- Biggest win: Dreamers 95-65 Heat (January 18, 2020)
- Biggest defeat: Dreamers 81-90 Braves (December 7, 2019)

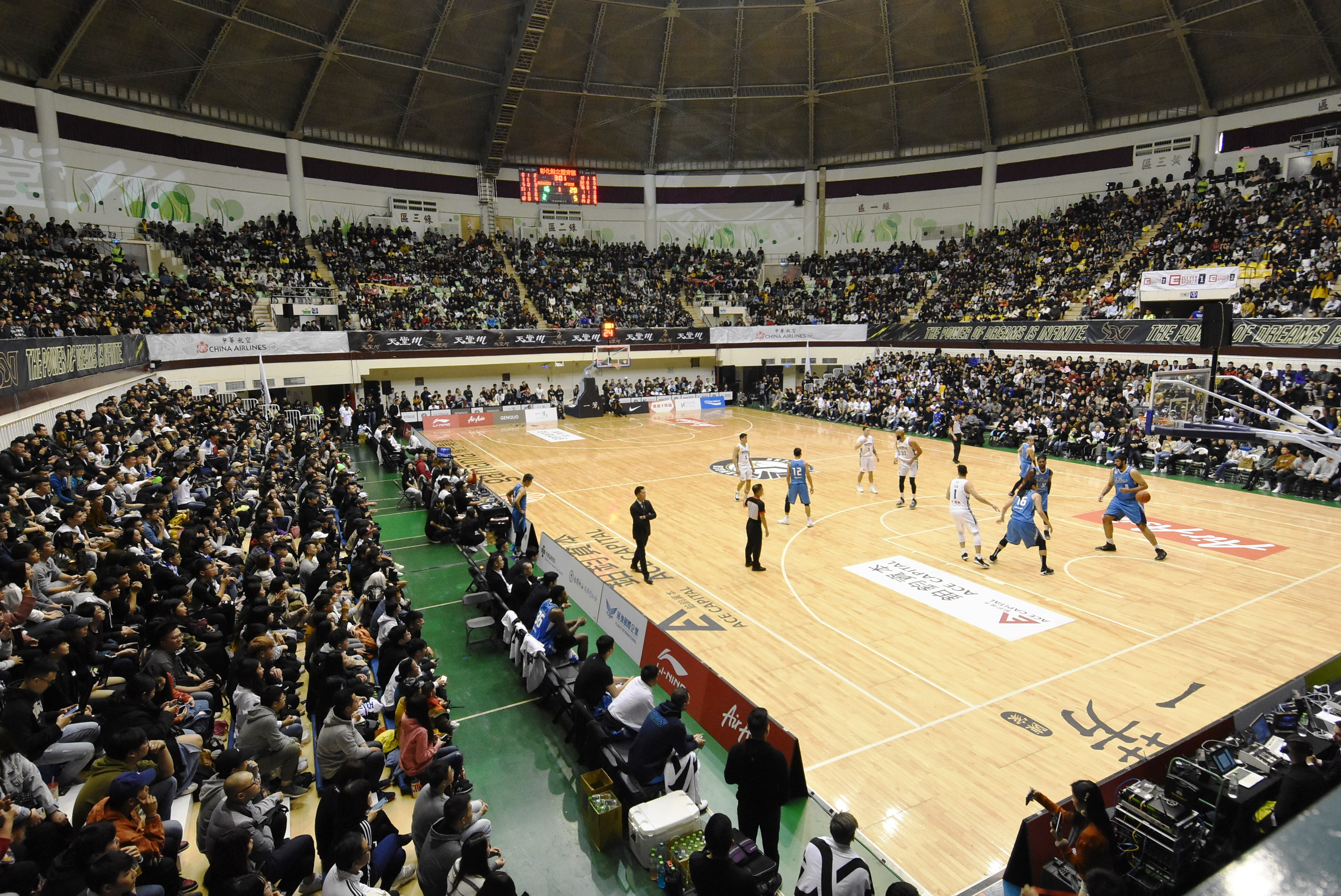

The 2019–20 Formosa Dreamers season was the franchise's 3rd season, its third season in the ASEAN Basketball League (ABL), its 3rd in Changhua County. The Dreamers are coached by Kyle Julius in his first year as head coach. The Dreamers play their home games at Changhua County Stadium.

== Standings ==
Team	GP	W	L	PCT
(Thailand) Mono Vampire	16	12	4	.750
(Philippines) San Miguel Alab Pilipinas	16	10	6	.625
(Malaysia) Kuala Lumpur Dragons	17	10	7	.588
(Chinese Taipei) Formosa Dreamers	14	8	6	.571
(Chinese Taipei) Taipei Fubon Braves	17	9	8	.529
Macau Black Bears	14	7	7	.500
Singapore Slingers	17	7	10	.412
Macau Wolf Warriors	13	5	8	.385
Hong Kong Eastern	10	3	7	.300
(Vietnam) Saigon Heat	14	3	11	.214

== Roster ==
Note: Flags indicate national team eligibility at FIBA-sanctioned events. Players may hold other non-FIBA nationalities not displayed.

2019-20 Formosa Dreamers roster
Players
Coaches

Pos.	No.	Nat.	Name	Ht.	Wt.	Age	From
C	0	(United States)	Ryan Watkins (I)	2.06 m (6 ft 9 in)	104 kg (229 lb)	34 – 3 October 1991	Boise State
F/C	1	(Chinese Taipei)	Tien Lei	2.03 m (6 ft 8 in)	103 kg (227 lb)	42 – 1 June 1983	NTNU
G	2	(United States)	Anthony Tucker (I)	1.93 m (6 ft 4 in)	93 kg (205 lb)	36 – 2 September 1989	Minnesota
G	3	(Chinese Taipei)	Chang Tsung-Hsien	1.92 m (6 ft 4 in)	86 kg (190 lb)	36 – 27 December 1988	BYU–Hawaii
F	4	(Chinese Taipei)	Chen Hsiao-Jung	1.97 m (6 ft 6 in)	90 kg (198 lb)	35 – 30 May 1990	DLIT
G/F	5	(Chinese Taipei)	Yang Chin-Min	1.90 m (6 ft 3 in)	98 kg (216 lb)	41 – 22 January 1984	Fu Jen
G	6	(Chinese Taipei)	Lee Hsueh-Lin	1.76 m (5 ft 9 in)	75 kg (165 lb)	41 – 31 January 1984	TPEC
F	7	(Chinese Taipei)	Chang Keng-Yu	1.88 m (6 ft 2 in)	85 kg (187 lb)	30 – 16 October 1995	NTUS
G	8	(Chinese Taipei)	Chen Yu-Han	1.88 m (6 ft 2 in)	80 kg (176 lb)	31 – 14 December 1993	I-Shou
G	9	(Chinese Taipei)	Chen Shih-Nien	1.84 m (6 ft 0 in)	81 kg (179 lb)	41 – 8 April 1984	TPEC
C	10	(Chinese Taipei)	Wang Po-Chih	1.95 m (6 ft 5 in)	130 kg (287 lb)	29 – 29 October 1996	NTSU
F	12	(United States)	Jerran Young (I)	1.98 m (6 ft 6 in)	99 kg (218 lb)	33 – 25 December 1991	Wright State
G	14	(Chinese Taipei)	Chi Sung-Yu	1.85 m (6 ft 1 in)	83 kg (183 lb)	30 – 1 July 1995	Chinese Culture
G/F	23	(United States) (Chinese Taipei)	Kenneth Chien	1.85 m (6 ft 1 in)	86 kg (190 lb)	30 – 6 February 1995	Broward
G	30	(Chinese Taipei)	Wu Sung-Wei	1.82 m (6 ft 0 in)	80 kg (176 lb)	32 – 21 May 1993	I-Shou

Head coach

- (Canada) Kyle Julius

Assistant coach(es)

- (Chinese Taipei) Tsai Yao-Hsun
- (Chinese Taipei) Lai Po-Lin

Athletic trainer(s)

- (Chinese Taipei) Wang Yu-Chih

Team manager

- (Chinese Taipei) Lin Wu Cheng-Lin

Legend

- (C) Team captain
- (I) Import player
- Injured

== Game log ==
=== Hualien Probation Basketball ===
==== Group stage ====
September 24

Jeoutai Technology	64–57	Formosa Dreamers

Hualien County Stadium, Hualien County

September 25

Formosa Dreamers	61–65	Team Thailand(Mono Vampire)

Hualien County Stadium, Hualien County

September 27

Bank of Taiwan	74–70	Formosa Dreamers

Hualien County Stadium, Hualien County

September 28

Formosa Dreamers	94–83	Team USA

Hualien County Stadium, Hualien County

==== 7th place ====
September 29

Formosa Dreamers	88–63	Hao Yu International Company

Hualien County Stadium, Hualien County

=== MABA International Basketball Invitation ===
October 22

Formosa Dreamers	77–85	Westports Malaysia Dragons

MABA Stadium, Kuala Lumpur

October 23

Australia ACBA Dragons	96–77	Formosa Dreamers

MABA Stadium, Kuala Lumpur

October 25

Formosa Dreamers	106–63	Australia Wah Chin Kings

MABA Stadium, Kuala Lumpur

October 26

Xiamen University	72–79	Formosa Dreamers

MABA Stadium, Kuala Lumpur

October 27

Malaysia National Team	78–88	Formosa Dreamers

MABA Stadium, Kuala Lumpur

=== Regular season ===
2019–20 game log
Total: 8–6 (Home: 5–3; Road: 3–3)
November : 0–1 (Home: 0–0; Road: 0–1)

Game	Date	Team	Score	High points	High rebounds	High assists	Location Attendance	Record
1	November 23	@Vampire	L 90-95	Marcus Keene (22)	Jerran Young (18)	Marcus Keene (6)	Stadium 29	0–1

December : 2–3 (Home: 2–3; Road: 0–0)

Game	Date	Team	Score	High points	High rebounds	High assists	Location Attendance	Record
2	December 1	Black Bears	L 85-91	Marcus Keene (28)	Jerran Young (12)	Marcus Keene (12)	Changhua County Stadium	0–2
3	December 7	Braves	L 81-90	Marcus Keene (22)	Jerran Young (15)	Marcus Keene (8)	Changhua County Stadium	0–3
4	December 8	Black Bears	W 100-94	Marcus Keene (29)	Liam McMorrow (13)	Marcus Keene (10)	Changhua County Stadium	1–3
PPD	December 14	@Wolf Warriors	Postponed					
5	December 21	Braves	W 88-80	Anthony Tucker (25)	Jerran Young (16)	Anthony Tucker (9)	Changhua County Stadium	2–3
6	December 22	Alab	L 99-100	Jordan Tolbert (25)	Jerran Young (12)	Anthony Tucker (11)	Changhua County Stadium	2–4

January : 4–2 (Home: 1–0; Road: 3–2)

Game	Date	Team	Score	High points	High rebounds	High assists	Location Attendance	Record
7	January 3	@Braves	L 76-83	Jerran Young (25)	Jerran Young (14)	Jerran Young (6)	Taipei Heping Basketball Gymnasium	2–5
8	January 5	Slingers	W 88-77	Jerran Young (21)	Jordan Tolbert (14)	Anthony Tucker (7)	Changhua County Stadium	3–5
9	January 8	@Wolf Warriors	W 92-89	Jerran Young (23)	Jerran Young (22)	Anthony Tucker (11)	Zhongshan Shaxi Gymnasium	4–5
10	January 10	@Wolf Warriors	W 100-89	Anthony Tucker (31)	Jordan Tolbert (7)	Anthony Tucker (13)	Zhongshan Shaxi Gymnasium	5-5
11	January 12	@Dragons	L 79-80	Jerran Young (25)	Jerran Young (12)	Anthony Tucker (5)	MABA Stadium	5–6
12	January 18	@Heat	W 95-65	Jerran Young (30)	Jerran Young (17)	Anthony Tucker (6)	CIS Arena	6-6

February : 2–0 (Home: 2–0; Road: 0–0)

Game	Date	Team	Score	High points	High rebounds	High assists	Location Attendance	Record
13	February 1	Dragons	W 85-79	Anthony Tucker (22)	Jerran Young (16)	Anthony Tucker (8)	Changhua County Stadium	7–6
14	February 2	Heat	W 89-80	Anthony Tucker (30)	Jerran Young (19)	Jerran Young (6)	Changhua County Stadium	8–6
PPD	February 8	Eastern	Postponed					
PPD	February 9	Eastern	Postponed					
PPD	February 19	@Eastern	Postponed					
PPD	February 22	Wolf Warriors	Postponed					
PPD	February 23	Wolf Warriors	Postponed					

March : 0–0 (Home: 0–0; Road: 0–0)

Game	Date	Team	Score	High points	High rebounds	High assists	Location Attendance	Record
PPD	March 1	@Slingers	Postponed					
PPD	March 7	@Braves	Postponed					
PPD	March 14	Vampire	Postponed					
PPD	March 22	@Alab	Postponed					
PPD	March 25	@Eastern	Postponed					
PPD	March 27	@Black Bears	Postponed					
PPD	March 29	@Black Bears	Postponed					

2019–20 schedule

== Player statistics ==
Legend
GP	Games played	MPG	Minutes per game	2P%	2-point field goal percentage
3P%	3-point field goal percentage	FT%	Free throw percentage	RPG	Rebounds per game
APG	Assists per game	SPG	Steals per game	BPG	Blocks per game
PPG	Points per game		Led the league

Player	GP	MPG	PPG	2P%	3P%	FT%	RPG	APG	SPG	BPG
Chang Keng-Yu	3	2.6	1.3	100.0%	0.0%	0.0%	0.0	0.0	0.0	0.0
Chang Tsung-Hsien	14	33.1	13.4	50.9%	34.4%	52.2%	3.2	2.7	1.3	0.2
Chen Hsiao-Jung	1	5.9	0.0	0.0%	0.0%	0.0%	2.0	1.0	0.0	0.0
Chen Shih-Nien	2	8.4	1.5	0.0%	33.3%	0.0%	0.5	0.5	0.0	0.0
Chen Yu-Han	7	7.4	1.0	14.3%	20.0%	100.0%	1.1	0.9	0.0	0.0
Chi Sung-Yu	2	2.0	0.0	0.0%	0.0%	0.0%	0.5	0.0	0.0	0.0
Kenneth Chien	5	23.0	5.6	42.9%	27.3%	33.3%	3.4	2.0	0.8	0.0
Marcus Keene^{‡}	4	33.8	25.3	47.7%	36.1%	80.0%	6.3	9.0	2.0	0.0
Lee Hsueh-Lin	4	14.6	1.3	100.0%	16.7%	0.0%	1.8	1.8	0.3	0.0
Liam McMorrow^{‡}	4	31.8	12.8	58.6%	0.0%	73.9%	10.3	0.5	0.8	1.0
Tien Lei	12	11.3	4.3	75.0%	38.7%	80.0%	2.5	0.5	0.7	0.2
Jordan Tolbert^{≠‡}	8	33.5	12.6	56.6%	0.0%	58.3%	9.3	0.6	0.9	0.9
Anthony Tucker^{≠}	10	39.2	20.9	40.3%	40.0%	92.6%	5.9	7.9	0.9	0.1
Wang Po-Chih	3	5.8	1.7	50.0%	0.0%	50.0%	1.0	0.7	0.0	0.0
Ryan Watkins^{≠}	2	27.9	11.5	55.0%	0.0%	20.0%	8.5	0.5	1.0	1.0
Wu Sung-Wei	9	13.6	6.1	50.0%	48.6%	100.0%	1.6	0.4	0.2	0.0
Yang Chin-Min	13	25.2	9.9	50.0%	37.5%	81.8%	3.2	2.5	0.6	0.2
Jerran Young	14	35.5	20.5	54.1%	22.8%	86.1%	13.9	5.1	3.3	1.9

- Reference：

^{‡} Waived during the season
^{≠} Acquired during the season

== Transactions ==
=== Overview ===
Players Added

Free agency

- Domagoj Bubalo
- Chang Tsung-Hsien
- Chi Sung-Yu
- Marcus Keene
- Liam McMorrow
- Cullen Russo
- Jordan Tolbert
- Anthony Tucker
- Wang Po-Chih
- Ryan Watkins
- Yang Chin-Min
- Jerran Young
Players Lost

Free agency

- William Artino
- Chai Wei
- Cheng Wei
- Tevin Glass
- Malcolm Miller
- Tsai Cheng-Hsien
- Wu Yung-Sheng

Waived

- Domagoj Bubalo
- Marcus Keene
- Liam McMorrow
- Cullen Russo
- Jordan Tolbert

=== Free Agency ===
==== Additions ====
Date	Player	Contract terms	Former team	Ref.
August 21, 2019	Cullen Russo	—	(Japan) Aomori Wat's	
August 23, 2019	Domagoj Bubalo	—	(Georgia (country)) BC Dinamo Tbilisi	
September 2, 2019	Yang Chin-Min	—	(China) Beikong Fly Dragons	
September 4, 2019	Wang Po-Chih	—	NTSU	
September 6, 2019	Chang Tsung-Hsien	—	Fubon Braves	
September 13, 2019	Chi Sung-Yu	—	PCCU	
October 10, 2019	Jerran Young	—	Singapore Slingers	
November 1, 2019	Marcus Keene	—	(South Korea) Jeonju KCC Egis	
November 14, 2019	Liam McMorrow	—	(China) Hunan Yongsheng	
December 10, 2019	Anthony Tucker	—	(Thailand) Mono Vampire	
December 12, 2019	Jordan Tolbert	—	(France) Caen Basket Calvados	
January 24, 2020	Ryan Watkins	—	(Thailand) Mono Vampire	

==== Subtractions ====
Date	Player	Reason	New Team	Ref.
June 20, 2019	Tevin Glass	contract expired work visa issue	(Hong Kong) Tsuen Wan	
June 28, 2019	Cheng Wei	contract expired	Hsinchu JKO Lioneers	
July 4, 2019	Will Artino	contract expired work visa issue	(Bahrain) Al-Muharraq	
July 29, 2019	Wu Yung-Sheng	contract expired	(China) Xinjiang Flying Tigers	
August 5, 2019	Malcolm Miller	contract expired work visa issue	(Brazil) Unifacisa	
October 2, 2019	Cullen Russo	waived	(Finland) KTP Basket	
October 2, 2019	Domagoj Bubalo	waived	(Slovakia) BK Inter Bratislava	
December 12, 2019	Marcus Keene	replaced by Anthony Tucker and Jordan Tolbert	Yulon Luxgen Dinos	
December 12, 2019	Liam McMorrow	replaced by Anthony Tucker and Jordan Tolbert	—	
January 24, 2020	Jordan Tolbert	replaced by Ryan Watkins	Taoyuan Pauian Archiland	
—	Chai Wei	—	—	
—	Tsai Cheng-Hsien	—	—	

== Awards ==
=== Players of the Week ===
Week	Recipient	Date awarded	Ref.
Week 4	Jerran Young	—	
Week 8	Jerran Young	—	
