= Jaleel Cousins =

American basketball player (born 1993)

Personal information
- Born: December 1, 1993 (age 32) Mobile, Alabama, U.S.
- Listed height: 6 ft 10 in (2.08 m)
- Listed weight: 255 lb (116 kg)

Career information
- High school: LeFlore Magnet (Mobile, Alabama); Spanish Fort (Spanish Fort, Alabama)
- College: Navarro College (2012–2014); South Florida (2014–2016)
- NBA draft: 2016: undrafted
- Playing career: 2016–2019
- Position: Center

Career history
- 2016–2017: Texas Legends
- 2017: Reno Bighorns
- 2017: Formosa Dreamers
- 2018–2019: Santa Cruz Warriors
- Stats at Basketball Reference

Jaleel Cousins (born December 1, 1993) is an American former professional basketball player. He played college basketball for Navarro College and South Florida.

== High school career ==
Cousins first attended LeFlore Magnet High School in his native Mobile, Alabama, however, he transferred as a senior to Spanish Fort High School. As a senior for the Toros, he was a member of the ASWA All-State Class 5A.

== College career ==
Cousins began his college career at Navarro College, where he averaged 3.7 points and 2.9 rebounds as a freshman and improved those numbers to 7.1 points and 4.8 rebounds per game as a sophomore.

In his junior season, Cousins transferred to South Florida. He averaged 8.5 points, 7.9 rebounds, 1.6 blocks and 25.0 minutes per contest 33 games as a senior.

== Professional career ==
=== Texas Legends (2016–2017) ===
After going undrafted in the 2016 NBA draft, Cousins joined the Dallas Mavericks for the 2016 NBA Summer League. On October 17, 2016, he signed with the Mavericks, but was waived five days later. On October 30, 2016, he was acquired by the Texas Legends of the NBA Development League as an affiliate player of the Mavericks. On January 29, 2017, he was waived by the Legends.

=== Reno Bighorns (2017) ===
On February 3, 2017, Cousins was acquired by the Reno Bighorns.

=== Formosa Dreamers (2017) ===
Cousins was acquired as an import player for the Formosa Dreamers and debuted in his first ASEAN Basketball League game on November 18, 2017, in a loss to the CLS Knights.

=== Santa Cruz Warriors (2018–2019) ===
For the 2018–19 season, Cousins joined the Santa Cruz Warriors of the NBA G League.

== Personal life ==
He is the son of Monique Cousins and the younger brother of DeMarcus Cousins. He majored in communications.
