= Dean Murray (basketball) =

American basketball coach (born 1964)

MBB
- Position: Assistant coach
- League: BAL

Personal information
- Born: June 6, 1964 (age 62) Isle of Palms, South Carolina

Career information
- High school: Monroe (Monroe, North Carolina)
- College: Appalachian State (1985–1987); South Carolina

Career history

Coaching
- 1989–2001: Coastal Carolina; Charleston Southern; Stony Brook (assistant)
- 2001–2002: Charleston Lowgators (assistant)
- 2002–2003: Neptūnas Klaipėda (assistant)
- 2003: Wilmington Waverockers
- 2003–2004: Charleston Lowgators (assistant)
- 2004–2005: Columbus Riverdragon (assistant)
- 2005–2006: Neptūnas Klaipėda
- 2007–2008: Anaheim Arsenal (assistant)
- 2008–2010: LG Sakers (assistant)
- 2010: Xinjiang Flying Tigers (assistant)
- 2011: Zhejiang CB (assistant)
- 2011: Saitama Broncos
- 2012–2013: Anyang KGC (assistant)
- 2013–2014: Texas Legends (assistant)
- 2015–2016: Foshan Long Lions
- 2018–2019: Formosa Dreamers
- 2019: Al-Muharraq
- 2020–2021: Patriots
- 2022: Kaohsiung 17LIVE Steelers
- 2023: REG
- 2024: Hefei Storm
- 2025–present: MBB (assistant)

Career highlights
- Rwandan League champion (2020); ABL Coach of the Year (2019)

Dean Murray (born June 6, 1964) is an American professional basketball coach. He is currently an assistant coach with MBB Basketball of the Basketball Africa League (BAL). Murray has coached several professional teams in Europe, Asia and Africa.

== Playing career ==
Murray played college basketball for Appalachian State Mountaineers men's basketball team from 1985 to 1987, in a total of seven games over two seasons.

== Coaching career ==
Murray's professional coaching career started in 2001 with the Charleston Lowgators of the NBA D-League.

Murray was the head coach of the Saitama Broncos in the Japanese Bj League in 2011.

Murray coached Al-Muharraq SC in Bahrain in 2019.

In February 2020, he signed in Rwanda as coach of Patriots BBC, which play in the first Basketball Africa League (BAL) season. He parted ways with the team in March 2021.

In February 2023, Murray agreed to coach the REG BBC team during the 2023 BAL season. Under Murray, REG was eliminated in the quarter-finals.

In May 2025, Murray was an assistant coach for South African team MBB in the 2025 BAL season.

== Personal ==
Murray is married to his wife who he met during his tenure as assistant coach at Charleston Southern University.
