= Erron Maxey =

American professional basketball player

Personal information
- Born: December 6, 1978 (age 47) Lake Elsinore, California, U.S.
- Listed height: 6 ft 6 in (1.98 m)
- Listed weight: 220 lb (100 kg)

Career information
- High school: Temescal Canyon (Lake Elsinore, California); Elsinore (Lake Elsinore, California)
- College: Providence (1997–2001)
- NBA draft: 2001: undrafted
- Playing career: 2001–2021
- Position: Small forward / power forward

Career history
- 2001: Ferro Carril Oeste
- 2002: Pennsylvania ValleyDawgs
- 2002–2003: Pussihukat
- 2003–2004: Columbus Riverdragons
- 2005–2006: Kaposvári KK
- 2006: Santos Reales de San Luis
- 2006–2007: Quimsa
- 2007: Maratonistas de Coamo
- 2007–2008: Asociación Deportiva Atenas
- 2008: Santos Reales de San Luis
- 2008: Quimsa
- 2008: Universidad de Concepción
- 2008–2009: Obras Sanitarias
- 2009–2010: Gold Coast Blaze
- 2010–2011: Wellington Saints
- 2010–2011: Union Atletica Montevideo
- 2011–2012: Niigata Albirex
- 2012: Bucaros de Bucaramanga
- 2012–2013: Club Nacional de Football
- 2013: Nelson Giants
- 2013–2014: Unión Atlética Montevideo
- 2015–2016: Toowoomba Mountaineers
- 2015–2016: Club Atlético Bohemios
- 2016–2018: GIE Maile Matrix
- 2018: Formosa Dreamers
- 2021: GIE Maile Matrix

Career highlights
- 2× NZNBL champion (2010, 2011); NBL Best Sixth Man (2010); QBL All-League Team (2015); UBA Most Valuable Player (2021)

Erron James Maxey (born December 6, 1978) is an American former professional basketball player.

== High school career ==
Maxey attended Temescal Canyon High School for two years where he was a standout for the basketball team. He then transferred to Elsinore High School where he captained the school for two years, winning the league Most Valuable Player award in 1996 and 1997. In 1997, he helped Elsinore to a 23–3 record and a league championship averaging 28.7 points, 14.1 rebounds, 3.5 assists and 4.0 blocks per game individually. He finished his career at Elsinore High School as their all-time leading scorer, and as a senior, won the Riverside County Player of the Year award.

== College career ==
After attracting a lot of interest from various colleges, Maxey elected to attend Providence. As a freshman, he played mostly as a center and averaged 7.3 points and 4.3 rebounds per game. He played two games at the Big East men's basketball tournament, scoring 22 points and grabbing four rebounds.

As a sophomore, Maxey continued to play as a center and improved his averages to 9.9 points and 5.9 rebounds per game. He was third on the team in scoring and had four double-doubles.

As a junior, Maxey co-captained the Friars and starred as the team's top scorer with 14.8 points per game. He had eight double-doubles and grabbed a career-high 21 rebounds at the Big East Tournament.

As a senior, Maxey was sole captain and starred once again as the top scorer and rebounder. He entered the 2001 NBA draft but went undrafted.

== Professional career ==
Maxey began his professional career in 2001 with Ferro Carril Oeste in Argentina where he averaged 22.3 points and 5.3 rebounds per game before returning to the United States where he signed with the Pennsylvania ValleyDawgs. He then played in Finland, the NBA Development League, Hungary and Mexico before returning to Argentina in 2006. He played the next three seasons in Central and South America before moving to Australia in 2009 where he played for the Gold Coast Blaze during the 2009–10 NBL season. After earning Australian NBL Best Sixth Man honors, he joined the Wellington Saints where he helped them win championships in 2010 and 2011. Over the next two and a bit years, he spent time in Japan, Colombia and Uruguay before returning to New Zealand in March 2013 as he teamed up with the Nelson Giants for the 2013 New Zealand NBL season. In September 2013, he re-joined Union Atletica Montevideo and played 12 games for the club before leaving in January 2014.

On March 26, 2015, Maxey signed with the Toowoomba Mountaineers for the 2015 Queensland Basketball League season. He led his team to the quarter-finals with a fifth-place finish and an 11–6 win–loss record. On August 18, he played for the QBL All-Stars in an exhibition match against the LSU Tigers men's basketball team, scoring five points in a 91–88 loss. Four days later, the Mountaineers were knocked out of the playoffs, losing their semi-final match-up to the Mackay Meteors. Maxey helped the Mountaineers go from last on the ladder in 2014, to a semi-final appearance in 2015. He appeared in all 19 games for the Mountaineers in 2015, averaging 26.2 points, 10.5 rebounds, 2.8 assists and 1.4 steals per game, on his way to earning All-League Team honors alongside teammate Jeremy Kendle.

On October 28, 2015, Maxey returned to Uruguay, signing with Club Atlético Bohemios for the rest of the 2015–16 season. In 17 games for Bohemios in 2015–16, he averaged 19.6 points, 7.9 rebounds, 1.9 assists and 1.1 steals per game. Following the conclusion of the Uruguayan League season, Maxey returned to the Toowoomba Mountaineers for the 2016 Queensland Basketball League season. Due to incomplete paperwork, Maxey was unable to play for the Mountaineers in their 2016 season opener. In the Mountaineers' season finale on August 6, Maxey scored a season-high 40 points in a 123–88 loss to the Gold Coast Rollers. The Mountaineers dropped from semi-finalists in 2015 to second last on the ladder in 2016 with a 3–14 record. In 16 games for the club in 2016, he averaged 26.6 points, 12.3 rebounds, 3.1 assists and 1.0 steals per game.

Between 2016 and 2018, Maxey played for GIE Maile Matrix of the Universal Basketball Association. He then had a one-game stint with Taiwanese team Formosa Dreamers in February 2018.
