= Formosa Dreamers =

Professional basketball team in Taiwan

- 2026–27 Formosa Dreamers season
- Leagues: Taiwan Professional Basketball League
- Founded: October 11, 2017
- History: Formosa Dreamers; 2017–2020 (ABL); 2023–2024 (PLG); 2024–present (TPBL); Formosa Taishin Dreamers; 2020–2023 (PLG)
- Arena: Taichung Intercontinental Basketball Stadium
- Capacity: 3,000
- Location: Taichung City, Taiwan
- Team colors: Black, white, gray, fluorescent green
- President: Tien Lei
- General manager: Han Chun-Kai
- Head coach: Douglas Creighton
- Ownership: Formosa Basketball Development Corp.
- Affiliation: Taichung Dreamers Academy
- Championships: 1 TPBL: 1 (2026)
- Website: dreamers.tpbl.basketball

The Formosa Dreamers (Chinese: 福爾摩沙夢想家) are a Taiwanese professional basketball team based in Taichung City. They have competed in the Taiwan Professional Basketball League (TPBL) and play their home games at the Taichung Intercontinental Basketball Stadium. The Dreamers joined the ASEAN Basketball League (ABL) since the 2017–18 season for replacing Kaohsiung Truth as Taiwan team. The Dreamers became one of the four teams of the inaugural P. League+ season, and one of the seven teams of the inaugural TPBL season.

The Formosa Dreamers were founded by Chang Cheng-chung, Chris Hsu, Jimmy Chang, Blackie Chen and Jonathan Han, all of whom have different professions from various industries.

== Franchise history ==
On July 9, 2024, the Formosa Dreamers announced to join the Taiwan Professional Basketball League (TPBL).

On June 6, 2026, the Formosa Dreamers defeated the New Taipei Kings, 4–3, winning the 2025–26 season championship.

== Facilities ==
=== Home arenas ===
Arena	Location	Duration
Changhua County Stadium	Changhua County	2017–2021; 2023–2024
National Taiwan University of Sport Gymnasium	Taichung City	2020–2021
Taichung Intercontinental Basketball Stadium	Taichung City	2021–present

=== Training facilities ===
The Dreamers previously practiced at the Jhang Bei Civil Sports Center.

== Current roster ==
Formosa Dreamers roster
Players
Coaches

Pos.	No.	Nat.	Name	Ht.	Wt.	Age	From
SG	0	(Taiwan)	Chen Jen-Jei	1.83 m (6 ft 0 in)	83 kg (183 lb)	29 – 16 September 1997	Grand View
SF	2	(Taiwan)	Ma Chien-Hao	2.01 m (6 ft 7 in)	92 kg (203 lb)	25 – 29 April 2001	Georgia State
SG	3	(Taiwan)	Chang Tsung-Hsien (C)	1.92 m (6 ft 4 in)	88 kg (194 lb)	37 – 27 December 1988	BYU–Hawaii
PG	9	(Taiwan)	Wu Chia-Chun	1.74 m (5 ft 9 in)	70 kg (154 lb)	32 – 3 March 1994	NTSU
SF	10	(United States)	Stanton Kidd (I)	2.02 m (6 ft 8 in)	101 kg (223 lb)	34 – 18 March 1992	Colorado State
PG	11	(Taiwan)	Lin Chun-Chi	1.75 m (5 ft 9 in)	75 kg (165 lb)	28 – 29 January 1998	UCH
SG	20	(Taiwan)	Chien Wei-Ju	1.86 m (6 ft 1 in)	85 kg (187 lb)	34 – 20 January 1992	NTNU
C	26	(Taiwan)	Lee Te-Wei	2.00 m (6 ft 7 in)	105 kg (231 lb)	35 – 15 October 1991	CCUT
SF	27	(Taiwan)	Shih Cheng-Ping	1.90 m (6 ft 3 in)	85 kg (187 lb)	27 – 1 October 1999	ISU
SG	28	(Taiwan)	Lu Kuan-Liang (injured)	1.85 m (6 ft 1 in)	85 kg (187 lb)	35 – 9 April 1991	NTUA
PF	33	(United States)	Trey Thompkins (I)	2.08 m (6 ft 10 in)	105 kg (231 lb)	36 – 29 May 1990	Georgia
C	34	(United States) (Taiwan)	Brandon Gilbeck (I)	2.13 m (7 ft 0 in)	107 kg (236 lb)	29 – 9 December 1996	Western Illinois
PF	35	(United States)	Aric Holman (I)	2.08 m (6 ft 10 in)	100 kg (220 lb)	29 – 11 July 1997	Mississippi State
PG	41	(Taiwan)	Chiang Yu-An	1.74 m (5 ft 9 in)	75 kg (165 lb)	35 – 4 August 1991	NTUS
SF	42	(United States) (Taiwan)	Randall Walko	1.96 m (6 ft 5 in)	93 kg (205 lb)	28 – 21 September 1998	TCNJ
PF	50	(Ghana)	Ben Bentil (I)	2.04 m (6 ft 8 in)	107 kg (236 lb)	31 – 29 March 1995	Providence
PF	88	(Taiwan)	Chou Po-Chen	1.98 m (6 ft 6 in)	98 kg (216 lb)	36 – 8 August 1990	NTNU

Head coach

- (Taiwan) (United States) Douglas Creighton

Assistant coach(es)

- (Australia) Jamie Pearlman (associate HC)
- (Taiwan) Lai Po-Lin
- (Serbia) Milan Stevanovic

Athletic trainer(s)

- (Taiwan) Hou Yao-Hsin
- (Taiwan) Chen Tzu-Chieh

Team manager

- (Taiwan) Han Chun-Kai

Legend

- (C) Team captain
- (I) Import player
- Injured

- Roster
- Transactions
Updated: November 2, 2026

== Season-by-season record ==
Season	League	Coach	Regular season				Postseason	Asian competition					
Season	League	Coach	Won	Lost	Win %	Finish	Postseason	League	Won	Lost	Win %	Finish	Result
2017–18	ABL	Hsu Hao-Cheng	1	19	.050	9th	Did not qualify	Did not participate					
2018–19	ABL	Dean Murray	19	7	.731	1st	Lost quarterfinals (Vampire) 0–2	Did not participate					
2019–20	ABL	Kyle Julius	8	6	.571	4th	Season cancelled by COVID-19 pandemic	Did not participate					
2020–21	PLG	Kyle Julius	10	14	.417	3rd	Won playoffs (Pilots) 3–2; Lost finals (Braves) 1–3	Did not participate					
2021–22	PLG	Kyle Julius	19	11	.633	2nd	Lost playoffs (Braves) 1–3	Did not participate					
2022–23	PLG	Kyle Julius	19	21	.475	4th	Lost playoffs (Kings) 1–3	Did not participate					
2022–23	PLG	Lai Po-Lin	19	21	.475	4th	Lost playoffs (Kings) 1–3	Did not participate					
2023–24	PLG	Jamie Pearlman	24	16	.600	2nd	Lost playoffs (Kings) 2–4	Did not participate					
2024–25	TPBL	Jamie Pearlman	21	15	.583	2nd	Lost semifinals (Aquas) 1–4	Did not participate					
2025–26	TPBL	Douglas Creighton	22	14	.611	2nd	Won semifinals (Lioneers) 3–1; Won finals (Kings) 4–3	Did not participate					
2026–27	TPBL	Douglas Creighton	1	4	.200			Did not participate					
Totals			144	127	.531	–	7 Playoff appearances	–	0	0	–	–	0 Playoff appearances

== Notable players ==
Local players

- (Taiwan) Chang Tsung-Hsien (張宗憲) – Chinese Taipei national team player, PLG MVP (2021)
- (Taiwan) Chen Hsiao-Jung (陳孝榮) – Chinese Taipei national team player
- (Taiwan) Chen Shih-Nien (陳世念) – Chinese Taipei national team player
- (Taiwan) Chiang Yu-An (蔣淯安) – Chinese Taipei national team player, SBL Finals MVP (2020), SBL MVP (2019, 2020), T1 League MVP (2022)
- (Taiwan) Chien Wei-Ju (簡偉儒) – Chinese Taipei national team player
- (Taiwan) (United States) Chieng Li-Huan (成力煥) – Chinese Taipei national team player
- (Taiwan) Chou Po-Chen (周柏臣) – Chinese Taipei national team player
- (Taiwan) (United States) Douglas Creighton (簡浩) – Chinese Taipei national team player
- (Taiwan) Lee Hsueh-Lin (李學林) – Chinese Taipei national team player, CBA Finals MVP (2012)
- (Taiwan) Lee Te-Wei (李德威) – Chinese Taipei national team player
- (Taiwan) Lin Chun-Chi (林俊吉) – Chinese Taipei national team player
- (Taiwan) Ma Chien-Hao (馬建豪) – Chinese Taipei national team player
- (Taiwan) (United Kingdom) Jonah Morrison (譚傑龍) – Chinese Taipei national team player
- (Taiwan) Tien Lei (田壘) – Chinese Taipei national team player, SBL MVP (2004–2006)
- (Taiwan) Wu Chia-Chun (吳家駿) – Chinese Taipei national team player
- (Taiwan) Wu Yung-Sheng (吳永盛) – Chinese Taipei national team player
- (Taiwan) Yang Chin-Min (楊敬敏) – Chinese Taipei national team player, SBL Finals MVP (2011)

Import players

- Anthony Bennett – NBA player, Canada national team player
- (Ghana) Ben Bentil – NBA player, TPBL Finals MVP (2026)
- (United States) Julian Boyd – Úrvalsdeild karla Finals MVP (2019)
- (United States) James Ennis – NBA player
- (United States) (Taiwan) Brandon Gilbeck – Chinese Taipei national team player
- (United States) Aric Holman – Polish Basketball Cup MVP (2024)
- İlkan Karaman – Turkey national team player
- (United States) Stanton Kidd – NBA player
- (United States) Ricky Ledo – NBA player
- (Croatia) Markus Lončar – Bosnia and Herzegovina national team player
- (United States) Devyn Marble – NBA player
- (United States) Chris McCullough – NBA player
- (United States) Malcolm Miller – NBA player
- Sir'Dominic Pointer – United States national team player
- (United States) Trey Thompkins – NBA player
