= Taiwan Shoufu University =

Private university in Madou, Tainan, Taiwan

Coordinates: 23°11′36″N 120°16′05″E

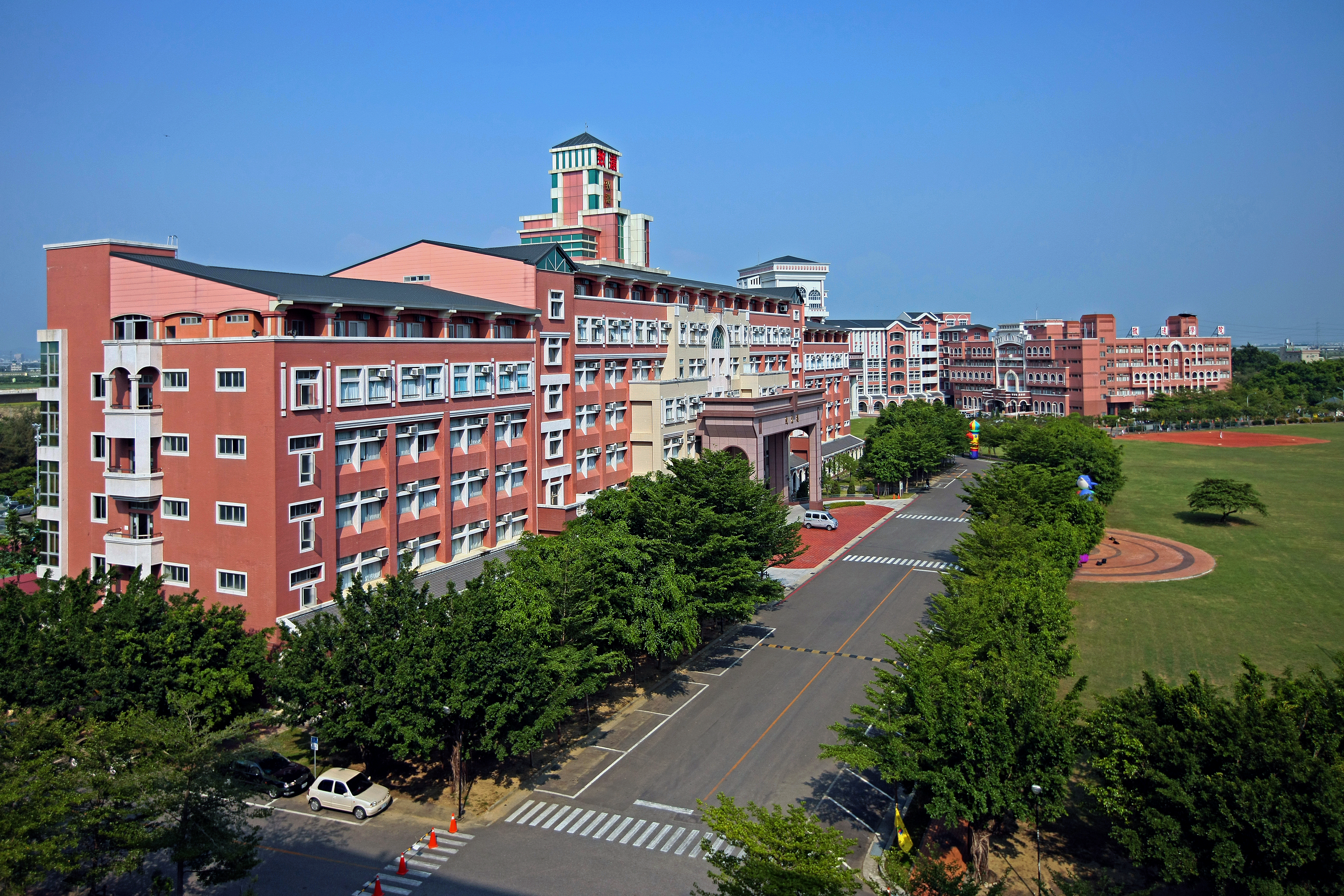
- Former name: Diwan College of Management
- Established: 2000
- Chairman: Xiu-Feng, Ying
- President: 汪宇琪
- Location: Madou, Tainan, Taiwan
- Website: www.tsu.edu.tw

Taiwan Shoufu University
- Traditional Chinese: 台灣首府大學
Transcriptions
Standard Mandarin
- Hanyu Pinyin: Táiwān Shǒufǔ Dàxué
Southern Min
- Hokkien POJ: Tâi-oân Siú-hú Tāi-ha̍k

Taiwan Shoufu University (TSU; Chinese: 台灣首府大學; Pe̍h-ōe-jī: Tâi-oân Siú-hú Tāi-ha̍k) was a private university in Madou District, Tainan, Taiwan, and ran independently with 2 hotels in Kaohsiung.

TSU offered a variety of undergraduate and graduate programs in fields such as engineering, management, social sciences, and humanities and had a number of research center and institutes focused on areas such as sustainable energy, smart agriculture, and digital transformation. The university ceased operations in August 2023.

== History ==
The university was originally established as Diwan College of Management (Chinese: 致遠管理學院; Pe̍h-ōe-jī: Tì-oán Koán-lí Ha̍k-īⁿ) in 2000. In 2010, the college was accredited and upgraded to Taiwan Shoufu University. In 2019, the university had an enrollment rate of 52.10%. In September 2022, the Ministry of Education ordered the university to improve their performance until May 2024 or they risk being shutdown. The university ceased operations and entered liquidation proceedings in August of 2023.

The acting president at the time of the shutdown was Bo-Wen, Lin (Chinese: 林博文; Pe̍h-ōe-jī: Lín-Bó-Wén). The Chairman of university board was Ciu-Feng, Ying (simplified Chinese: 应秀凤; traditional Chinese: 應秀鳳; Pe̍h-ōe-jī: Eng Siù-hōng).

== Faculties ==
There were eighteen departments categorized as three colleges, which were:

- College of Education and Design
- College of Leisure Industry
- College of Hotel Management

Academic Programs	Bachelor	Master
College of Education and Design
Graduate Institute of Education		●
Department of Early Childhood Education	●	●
Department of Computer Science and Multimedia Design	●	
College of Leisure Industry
Department of Leisure Management	●	●
Department of Leisure and Information Management	●	
Department of Business Administration	●	
Department of Tourism Management	●	
College of Hotel Management
Department of Hospitality Management	●	●
Department of Hotel Management	●	
Department of Baking Technology and Management	●	

== Campus ==
The university campus building was constructed on a land belonging to the Taiwan Sugar Corporation.
