= Lee Hsueh-lin =

Taiwanese basketball player

Lee Hsueh-lin 李學林
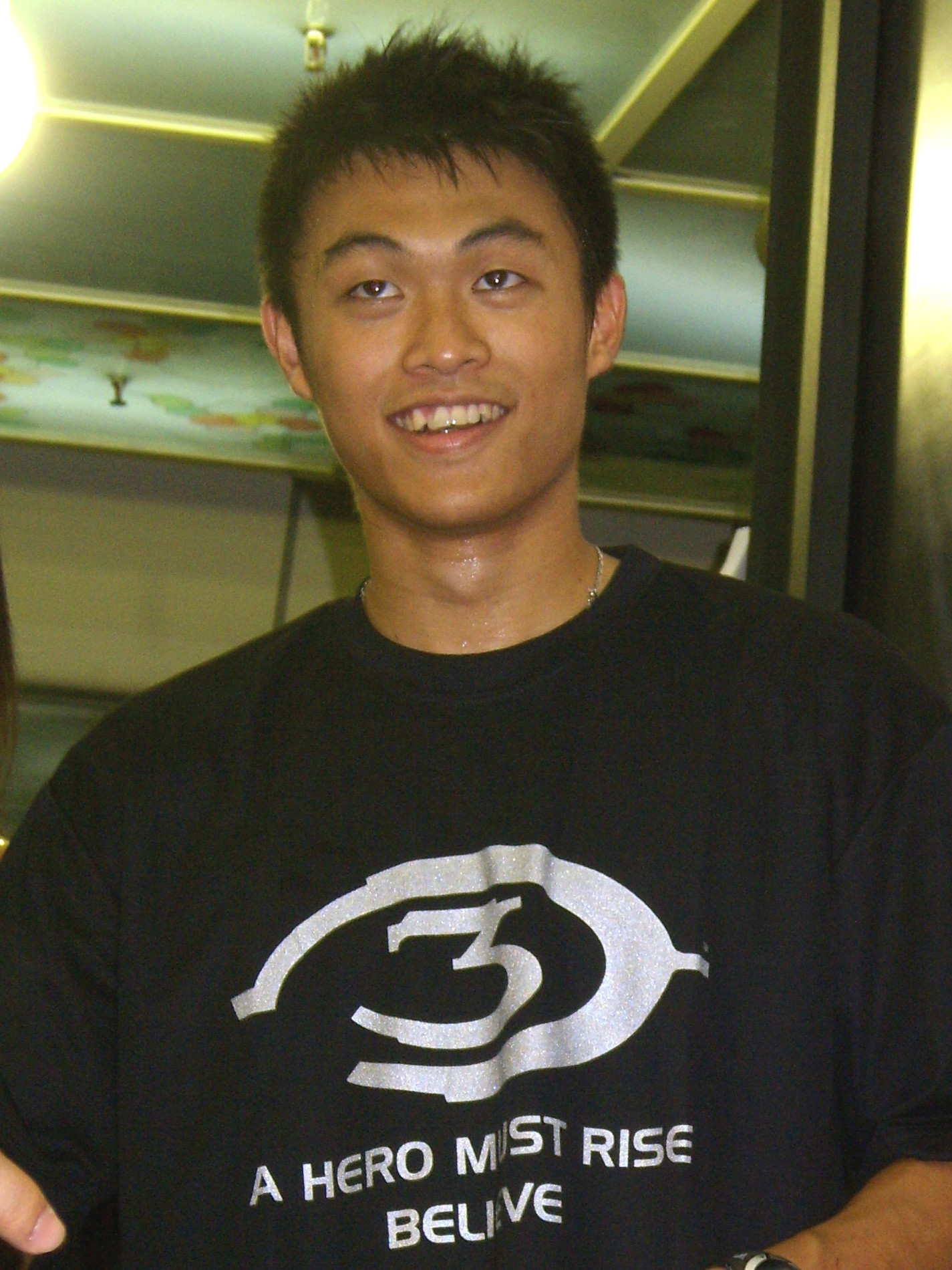
- Lee at the "Halo 3 Pre-launch Carnival" in Taiwan, 2007

Personal information
- Born: 31 January 1984 (age 42) Pingtung County, Taiwan
- Listed height: 5 ft 9 1/4 in (1.76 m)
- Listed weight: 165 lb (75 kg)

Career information
- High school: National Pingtung Senior High School
- College: Taipei Physical Education College
- Playing career: 2003–present
- Position: Point guard

Career history
- 2003–2010: Yulon Luxgen Dinos
- 2010–2014: Beijing Ducks
- 2015–2016: Shanghai Sharks
- 2016–2017: Guangzhou Loong Lions
- 2017–2018: Xinjiang Flying Tigers
- 2018–2020: Formosa Dreamers
- 2021–2023: New Taipei CTBC DEA
- 2023–2024: Taoyuan Pauian Pilots

Career highlights
- T1 League champion (2023); CBA champion (2012); CBA Finals MVP (2012)
Medals
Men's basketball
Representing Chinese Taipei
FIBA Asia Challenge
Bronze medal – third place	2004 Taipei
East Asian Games
Gold medal – first place	2005 Macau
Silver medal – second place	2009 Hong Kong

Lee Hsueh-lin (Chinese: 李學林; pinyin: Lǐ Xuélín; born as Lee Chih-ming (李至明) on 31 January 1984 in Pingtung County, Taiwan) is a Taiwanese professional basketball player. Lee has been a leading competitor in several top Asian leagues, including most prominently with the Beijing Ducks in the Chinese Basketball Association (CBA). During the 2011-2012 season, he helped the team win its first-ever CBA championship, and he was named CBA Finals MVP, several months after the campaign ended.

Dubbed the "Allen Iverson of Taiwan" by some observers, Lee has been acclaimed for his quickness and maneuverability with the basketball, since high school, where he won a scoring title. He served as the primary point guard for the Chinese Taipei men's national basketball team for most of the mid-2000s and early 2010s.

Lee is now recognized for his low turnover rate, as well as his ability to stretch the defense with sharp driving and quick and accurate shooting. He is valued as a player for his assist making capabilities, as well as his defensive skills, especially against quicker opponents.

== Professional career ==
In Taiwan's Super Basketball League, Lee helped the Yulon Dinos win titles in 2004, 2005, 2006, and 2010.

His CBA Finals MVP honor with the Beijing Ducks in 2012, did not come without controversy, as he only averaged 11 points per game during the series, while star American import Stephon Marbury poured in 33 points per game. Players from overseas were not allowed to win the award at the time, a rule which was later changed. Officials from China do not consider players from Taiwan to be foreigners, so the award was quietly given to Lee several months after the end of the season. On August 29, 2021, Lee has signed with New Taipei CTBC DEA of the T1 League on a 2-year contract.

== National team career ==
On the international scene, Lee helped lead the Chinese Taipei national basketball team to the main draw at four consecutive FIBA Asia Championship tournaments, where the team finished sixth in 2007, fifth in 2009, eighth in 2011, and fourth in 2013.

== See also ==
- FIBA Asia Championship
- Super Basketball League
