= Tien Lei =

Taiwanese basketball player

Tien Lei 田壘
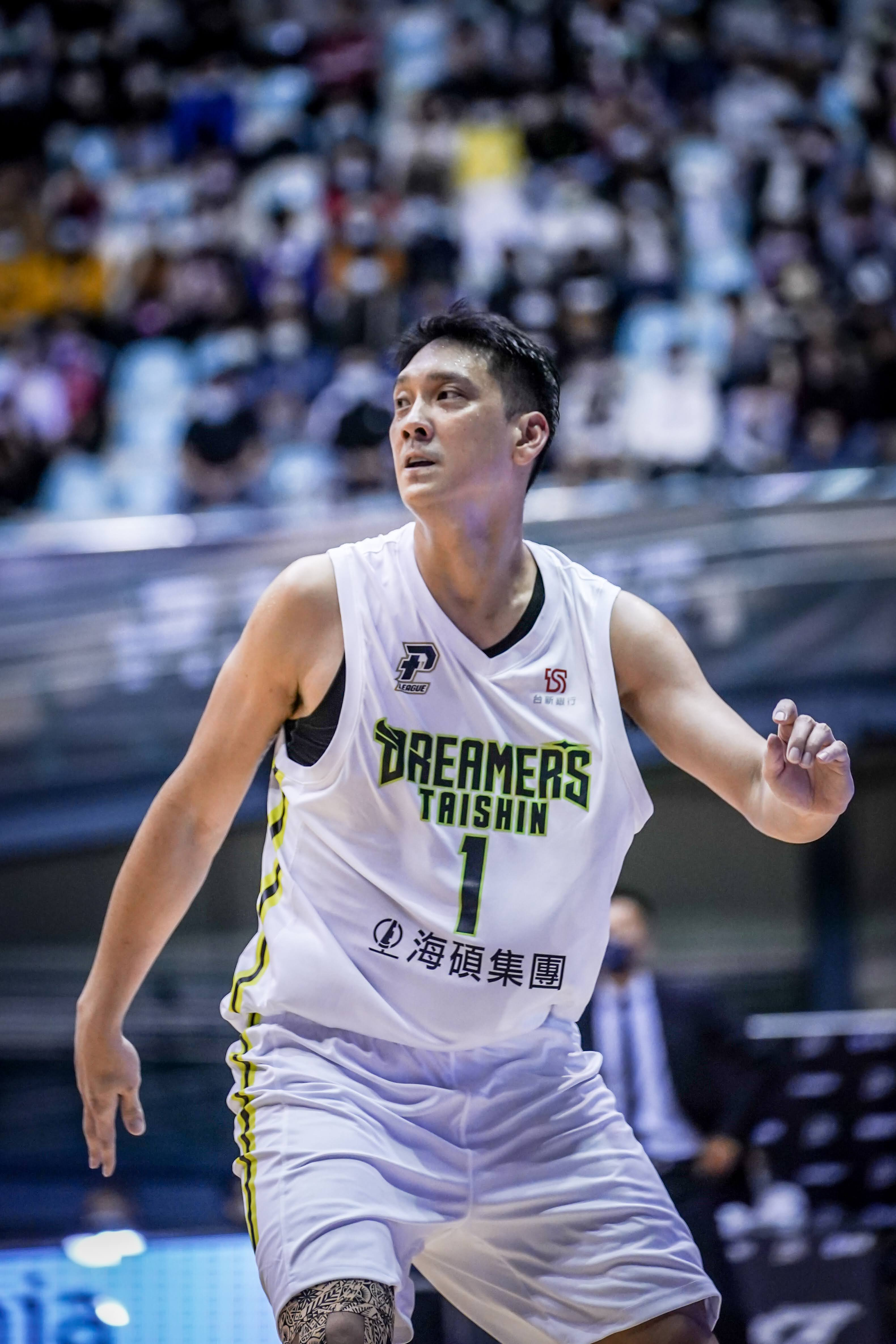

Formosa Taishin Dreamers
- Position: Power forward
- League: Taiwan Professional Basketball League

Personal information
- Born: 1 June 1983 (age 43) Kaohsiung, Taiwan
- Listed height: 6 ft 8 in (2.03 m)
- Listed weight: 216 lb (98 kg)

Career information
- High school: Kaohsiung Municipal Sanmin Home Economics & Commerce Vocational HS
- College: National Taiwan Normal University
- Playing career: 2001–2021
- Number: 1

Career history
- 2001–2014: Dacin Engineering
- 2014: Guangxi Weizhuang
- 2014–2018: Tianjin Ronggang
- 2018–2021: Formosa Dreamers / Formosa Taishin Dreamers
Medals
Men's basketball
Representing Chinese Taipei
FIBA Asia Challenge
Bronze medal – third place	2004 Taipei
East Asian Games
Silver medal – second place	2001 Osaka
Gold medal – first place	2005 Macau
Silver medal – second place	2009 Hong Kong
Gold medal – first place	2013 Tianjin
ABC Under-18 Championship
Bronze medal – third place	2000 Kuala Lumpur

Tien Lei (simplified Chinese: 田垒; traditional Chinese: 田壘; pinyin: Tián Lěi; born June 1, 1983, in Kaohsiung) is the existing Chairman of Formosa Dreamers and Taiwanese former professional basketball player.

Considered one of the most talented offensive players in Taiwan, Tien has won multiple scoring and rebounding champions of the Super Basketball League (SBL) there, while helping his team, the Dacin Tigers, to its first championship title in franchise history in 2009. He also appeared in the NBA Summer League in 2005.

Since his national team debut at the FIBA Asia Championship 2001, Tien has served as starting power forward for the Chinese Taipei men's national basketball team. In addition to his ability to make long-range shots, Tien has also been the most efficient rebounder on the Taiwanese team in international tournaments—owing much to his jumping ability. At the 2009 FIBA Asia Championship, he helped Chinese Taipei to a fifth-place finish, the team's best record in the tournament since the turn of the century, while averaging 10.6 points and 5.8 rebounds per game. He was thus named to the All-Tournament Third Team.

Despite the progress made by his teams in recent years, nonetheless, Tien's ability to rebound and make inside plays has been compromised by a fatigue fracture in his left tibia since 2007.

On March 15, 2021, Tien announced that the 2020-2021 season will be his last season before retirement.

On April 4, Tien played his last game and officially announced his retirement.
