= I-Shou University =

University in Dashu, Kaohsiung, Taiwan

- 義守大學
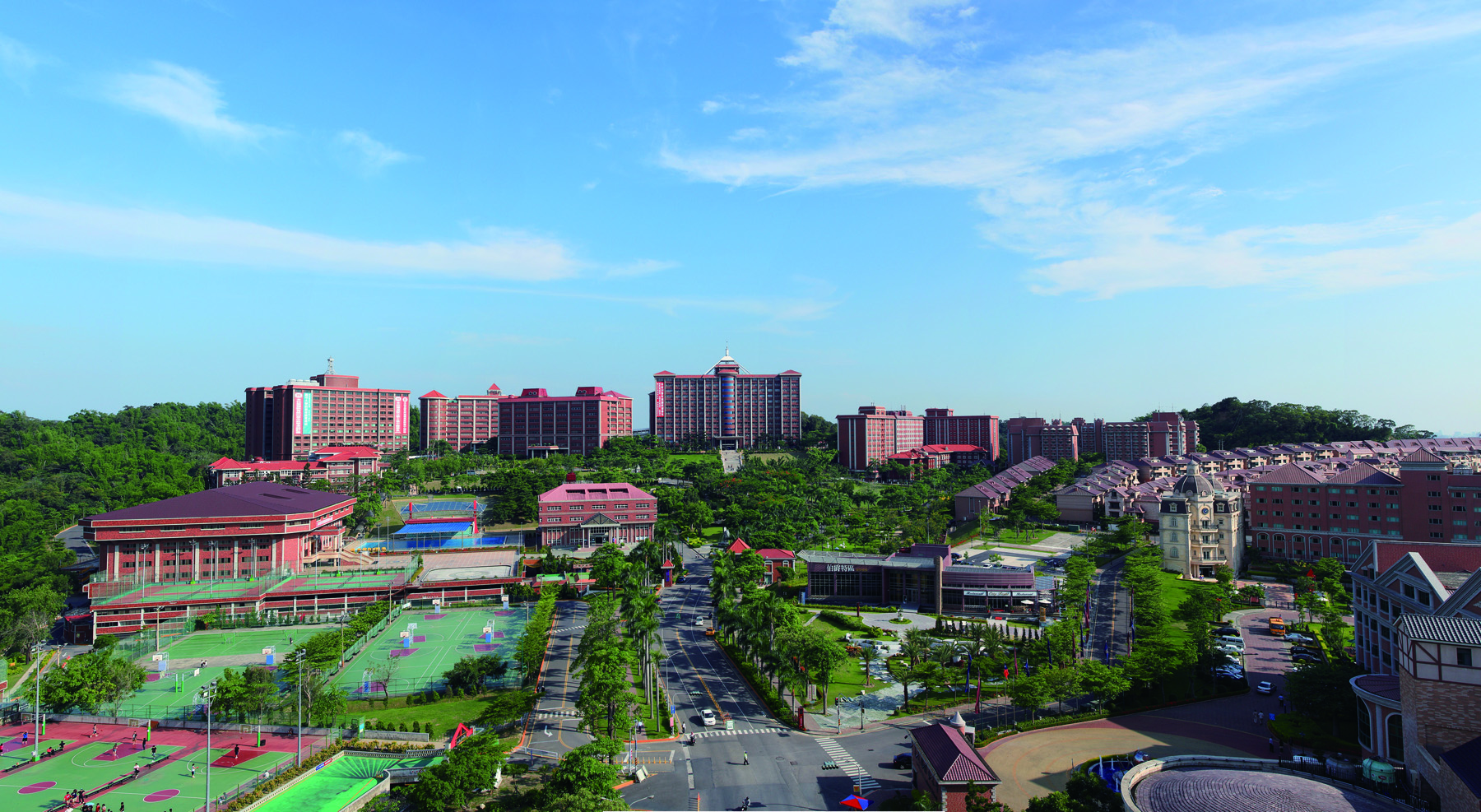
- Former names: Kaohsiung Polytechnic Institute (高雄工學院)
- Motto: 務實創新
- Motto in English: Pragmatism and Innovation
- Type: Private university
- Established: 1986 (as Kaohsiung Polytechnic Institute); 1997 (as ISU)
- President: Roger C. Y. Chen (陳振遠)
- Founder: I-shou Lin (林義守)
- Academic staff: 540 (Full-time); 398 (part-time)
- Students: 14,351
- Location: Main Campus; No.1, Sec.1, Syuecheng Rd., Dashu District; Medical Campus; No. 8, Yida Rd., Jiaosu Village, Yanchao District, Kaohsiung City, Taiwan
- Campus: Suburban
- Website: www.isu.edu.tw

Chinese name
- Traditional Chinese: 義守大學
Transcriptions
Standard Mandarin
- Hanyu Pinyin: Yìshǒu Dàxué
Southern Min
- Hokkien POJ: Gī-siú Tāi-ha̍k

I-Shou University (ISU; Chinese: 義守大學; Pe̍h-ōe-jī: Gī-siú Tāi-ha̍k) is a private university in Dashu District, Kaohsiung, Taiwan. Formerly known as the Kaohsiung Polytechnic Institute, ISU was established in 1986 by I-Shou Lin, the founder of E United Group (義联集團), to commemorate his mother as well as to benefit the villages and towns where he started his business. KPI was officially renamed I-Shou University on August 1, 1997.

ISU has ten colleges: College of Intelligent Science & Technology, College of Engineering, College of Management, College of Communication & Design, International College, College of Tourism & Hospitality, College of Language Arts, College of Medicine, College of Medical & Science Technology and College of Indigenous Studies. It has 43 departments offering 16 master's programs, 7 doctoral programs, 4 bachelor's degree programs for indigenous peoples, an international program, 12 evening bachelor's degree programs, 2 two-year in-service bachelor's degree programs, and 9 in-service master's programs.

== History ==
- 1986: Kaohsiung Polytechnic Institute was founded.
- 1990: Initial student recruitment.
- 1997: The institute was renamed as 'I-Shou University'.
- 1999: The establishment of the Yanchao Campus was approved.
- 2006: The Yanchao Campus was inaugurated.
- 2009: The International College was established, providing students with a total immersion learning environment in English.
- 2010: Initial student recruitment for the School of Chinese Medical for Post Baccalaureate.
- 2011: The College of Communication & Design and the College of Tourism & Hospitality were established.
- 2012: Initial student recruitment for the bachelor's degree Program for Indigenous Peoples in Communication & Design and the bachelor's degree Program for Indigenous Peoples in Tourism & Hospitality
- 2013: Initial student recruitment for the School of Medicine for International Students and the bachelor's degree Program for Indigenous Peoples in Nursing. The College of Medicine was officially established after 13 years' effort.
- 2014: The Yanchao Campus was renamed as the Medical Campus.
- 2015: Initial student recruitment for the bachelor's degree Program for Indigenous Peoples in Long-term Care.
- 2016: The College of Indigenous Studies was established.
- 2017: Initial student recruitment for the Department of Medical Laboratory Science.
- 2018: Initial student recruitment for the International Program on Intelligent Systems & Automation Engineering and the International Program on Communication Production.
- 2019: Initial student recruitment for the School of Medicine.
- 2020: The College of Intelligent Science and Technology was established.
- 2021: The College of Medical Science and Technology was established.

== ISU Presidents ==
Year	President
1990–2011	Dr. Shen-li Fu
2011–2012	Dr. Wan-long Hong (acting)
2012–2018	Dr. Jei-fu Shaw
2018–present	Dr. Roger C. Y. Chen

== Campuses ==
The Main Campus is located in the Guanyinshan area and accommodates the College of Intelligent Science & Technology, the College of Management, the College of Science & Engineering, the College of Language Arts, the College of Tourism & Hospitality, the College of Communication & Design, the International College, the College of Indigenous Studies, and the Center for General Education.

The Medical Campus, across from E-DA Hospital in Yanchao District of Kaohsiung City, was opened in 2006 to accommodate the College of Medicine. In 2010 ISU was approved by the Ministry of Education to establish the School of Chinese Medicine for Post Baccalaureate and three years later the School of Medicine for International Students with all courses taught in English in 2013. In 2018, ISU gained approval from the Ministry of Education to establish a six-year, government-funded MD program for Taiwanese citizens, and welcomed its inaugural class in 2019.
