= 2020–21 P. League+ season =

2020–21 PLG season
- League: P. League+
- Sport: Basketball
- Duration: December 19, 2020 – April 10, 2021; April 23, 2021 – May 2, 2021 (playoffs); May 7, 2021 – May 19, 2021 (finals)
- Games: 24
- Teams: 4
- TV partner(s): FTV One, MOMOTV

Regular season
- Top seed: Taipei Fubon Braves
- Season MVP: Chang Tsung-Hsien (Braves)
- Top scorer: Anthony Tucker (Dreamers)

Playoffs

Finals
- Champions: Taipei Fubon Braves
- Runners-up: Formosa Taishin Dreamers
- Finals MVP: Mike Singletary

P. League+ seasons
- 2021–22 →

The 2021–22 P. League+ season is the inaugural season of the P. League+ (PLG). The league launched with 4 teams playing a 24-game schedule. The regular season began on December 19, 2020, and was scheduled to end on April 10, 2021. The playoffs began on April 23 and was early ended on May 15 due to the Taiwanese pandemic restrictions after Game 4 of the 2021 P. League+ finals. The Taipei Fubon Braves, leading 3–1 in the finals, was declared the champion after the remaining finals games were cancelled.

== Transactions ==
=== Retirement ===
On February 19, 2021, Chi Sung-Yu announced his retirement from professional basketball.

=== Coaching changes ===
==== Off-season ====
- On August 3, 2020, the Hsinchu JKO Lioneers hired Lin Kuan-Lun as their head coach.
- On October 13, 2020, the Taoyuan hired Liu I-Hsiang as their head coach.

==== In-season ====
- On December 22, 2020, the Taoyuan and head coach Liu I-Hsiang mutually agreed to part ways before playing any games with the team.

== Imports / foreign student / heritage player ==
| Club | Imports | Foreign students | Heritage players |
|---|---|---|---|
| Formosa Taishin Dreamers | (United States) Stephan Hicks (United States) Anthony Tucker (United States) Jerran Young | —N/a | (United States) Randall Walko |
| Hsinchu JKO Lioneers | (United States) ~~Julian Wright~~ (United States) Branden Dawson (United States) LaDontae Henton (Tanzania) Hasheem Thabeet | (Macau) Iong Ngai-San | —N/a |
| Taipei Fubon Braves | (United States) Charles Garcia (United States) Mike Singletary (Ukraine) Ihor Zaytsev | (Saint Vincent and the Grenadines) Brendon Smart | —N/a |
| Taoyuan Pilots | (United States) ~~Willie Warren~~ (United States) Jordan Chatman (United States) Kadeem Jack (United States) Davon Reed | —N/a | —N/a |

Note 1: Heritage player refers to player of Taiwanese descent but does not have a ROC passport.

Note 2: Team can either register 1 heritage players or 1 foreign student.

== Preseason ==
The preseason began on October 17, and ended on November 22.

== Regular season ==
The regular season began on December 19, 2020, and ended on April 10, 2021.

| Team | GP | W | L | PCT |
|---|---|---|---|---|
| z – Taipei Fubon Braves | 24 | 19 | 5 | .792 |
| x – Taoyuan Pilots | 24 | 10 | 14 | .417 |
| x – Formosa Taishin Dreamers | 24 | 10 | 14 | .417 |
| Hsinchu JKO Lioneers | 24 | 9 | 15 | .375 |

Notes

- z – Clinched home court advantage for the entire playoffs
- x – Clinched playoff spot

== Playoffs ==
=== Bracket ===
| Playoffs | | | Finals |
| | | | **1** | **Braves** | **3** |
| 2 | Pilots | 2 | 3 | Dreamers | 1 |
| **3** | **Dreamers** | **3** |

Bold: series winner
Italic: team with home-court advantage

== Statistics ==
=== Individual statistic leaders ===
| Category | Player | Team(s) | Statistic |
|---|---|---|---|
| Points per game | Anthony Tucker | Formosa Taishin Dreamers | 27.88 |
| Rebounds per game | Hasheem Thabeet | Hsinchu JKO Lioneers | 14.26 |
| Assists per game | Anthony Tucker | Formosa Taishin Dreamers | 5.59 |
| Steals per game | Jerran Young | Formosa Taishin Dreamers | 3.32 |
| Blocks per game | Hasheem Thabeet | Hsinchu JKO Lioneers | 3.26 |
| 2P% | Hasheem Thabeet | Hsinchu JKO Lioneers | 61% |
| 3P% | Tsai Wen-Cheng | Taipei Fubon Braves | 50% |
| FT% | Lin Ming-Yi | Hsinchu JKO Lioneers | 88% |

=== Individual game highs ===
| Category | Player | Team | Statistic |
|---|---|---|---|
| Points | Davon Reed | Taoyuan Pilots | 43 |
| Rebounds | Ihor Zaytsev | Taipei Fubon Braves | 24 |
| Assists | Anthony Tucker | Formosa Taishin Dreamers | 12 |
| Steals | Jerran Young | Formosa Taishin Dreamers | 8 |
| Steals | Hasheem Thabeet | Hsinchu JKO Lioneers | 8 |
| Blocks | Hasheem Thabeet | Hsinchu JKO Lioneers | 7 |
| Turnovers | Ihor Zaytsev | Taipei Fubon Braves | 9 |

=== Team statistic leaders ===
| Category | Team | Statistic |
|---|---|---|
| Points per game | Taipei Fubon Braves | 101.75 |
| Rebounds per game | Taipei Fubon Braves | 53.63 |
| Assists per game | Taipei Fubon Braves | 22.67 |
| Steals per game | Hsinchu JKO Lioneers | 10.79 |
| Blocks per game | Hsinchu JKO Lioneers | 4.63 |
| Turnovers per game | Taoyuan Pilots | 18.58 |
| Fouls per game | Hsinchu JKO Lioneers | 21.96 |
| 2P% | Taipei Fubon Braves | 50.22% |
| 3P% | Taoyuan Pilots | 32.25% |
| FT% | Formosa Taishin Dreamers | 72.02% |

== Awards ==
=== Yearly awards ===
2020–21 P. League+ awards
| Award | Recipient(s) | ref |
|---|---|---|
| Most Valuable Player | Chang Tsung-Hsien (Taipei Fubon Braves) | |
| Import of the Year | Ihor Zaytsev (Taipei Fubon Braves) | |
| 6th Man of the Year | Randall Walko (Formosa Taishin Dreamers) | |
| Rookie of the Year | Kao Kuo-Hao (Hsinchu JKO Lioneers) | |
| Defensive Player of the Year | Hasheem Thabeet (Hsinchu JKO Lioneers) | |
| GM of the Year | Tsai Cheng-Ju (Taipei Fubon Braves) | |
| Coach of the Year | Hsu Chin-Che (Taipei Fubon Braves) | |
| Media Darling | Tien Lei (Formosa Taishin Dreamers) | |
| Best Home Court | Hsinchu JKO Lioneers | |
| Mr. Popular | Lin Chih-Chieh (Taipei Fubon Braves) | |

- All-PLG Team:
  - Chang Tsung-Hsien, Taipei Fubon Braves
  - Chieng Li-Huan, Hsinchu JKO Lioneers
  - Shih Chin-Yao, Taoyuan Pilots
  - Yang Chin-Min, Formosa Taishin Dreamers
  - Ihor Zaytsev, Taipei Fubon Braves

- All-Defensive Team:
  - Chieng Li-Huan, Hsinchu JKO Lioneers
  - Kao Kuo-Hao, Hsinchu JKO Lioneers
  - Chang Tsung-Hsien, Taipei Fubon Braves
  - Lee Te-Wei, Formosa Taishin Dreamers
  - Hasheem Thabeet, Hsinchu JKO Lioneers

==== Statistical awards ====
2020–21 P. League+ statistical awards
| Award | Recipient(s) | ref |
|---|---|---|
| Points Leader | Anthony Tucker(Formosa Taishin Dreamers) | |
| Rebounds Leader | Hasheem Thabeet(Hsinchu JKO Lioneers) | |
| Assists Leader | Anthony Tucker(Formosa Taishin Dreamers) | |
| Blocks Leader | Hasheem Thabeet(Hsinchu JKO Lioneers) | |
| Steals Leader | Jerran Young(Formosa Taishin Dreamers) | |

==== Finals ====
2021 P. League+ finals awards
| Award | Recipient(s) | ref |
|---|---|---|
| Champion | Taipei Fubon Braves | |
| Finals | Mike Singletary(Taipei Fubon Braves) | |

=== Players of the Week ===
==== Preseason ====
| Braves | Dreamers | Lioneers | Pilots | Ref |
|---|---|---|---|---|
| Chang Tsung-Hsien; Lin Chih-Chieh | Lee Te-Wei; Yang Chin-Min | Chieng Li-Huan; Kao Kuo-Hao | Lin Yao-Tsung; Shih Chin-Yao | |

==== Regular season ====
| Week | Local players | | | | Import players | Ref |
| Week | Braves | Dreamers | Lioneers | Pilots | Import players | Ref |
|---|---|---|---|---|---|---|
| 1 | Chang Tsung-Hsien (1/5) | Yang Chin-Min (1/4) | —N/a | Shih Chin-Yao (1/6) | Davon Reed (Pilots) (1/2) | |
| 2 | Chang Tsung-Hsien (2/5) | —N/a | Chieng Li-Huan (1/4) | Quincy Davis (1/3) | Charles Garcia (Braves) (1/1) | |
| 3 | Lin Chih-Chieh (1/4) | Yang Chin-Min (2/4) | Kao Kuo-Hao (1/5) | Shih Chin-Yao (2/6) | Anthony Tucker (Dreamers) (1/4) | |
| 4 | Lin Chih-Chieh (2/4) | Yang Chin-Min (3/4) | Kao Kuo-Hao (2/5) | —N/a | Anthony Tucker (Dreamers) (2/4) | |
| 5 | Chang Tsung-Hsien (3/5) | Lee Te-Wei (1/3) | Elliot Tan (1/1) | Shih Chin-Yao (3/6) | Julian Wright (Lioneers) (1/1) | |
| 6 | Tseng Hsiang-Chun (1/1) | Lee Te-Wei (2/3) | Tien Hao (1/3) | Quincy Davis (2/3) | Davon Reed (Pilots) (2/2) | |
| 7 | Joseph Lin (1/3) | Yang Chin-Min (4/4) | Chieng Li-Huan (2/4) | Quincy Davis (3/3) | Anthony Tucker (Dreamers) (3/4) | |
| 8 | Chang Tsung-Hsien (4/5) | Lee Te-Wei (3/3) | Cheng Wei (1/1) | Chang Keng-Yu (1/1) | Jerran Young (Dreamers) (1/2) | |
| 9 | Chang Tsung-Hsien (5/5) | Lin Chun-Chi (1/2) | Kao Kuo-Hao (3/5) | Kuan Ta-Tou (1/2) | Anthony Tucker (Dreamers) (4/4) | |
| 10 | Lin Chih-Chieh (3/4) | Lin Chun-Chi (2/3) | Kao Kuo-Hao (4/5) | Kuan Ta-Tou (2/2) | Jerran Young (Dreamers) (2/2) | |
| 11 | Lin Chih-Chieh (4/4) | Chen Jen-Jei (1/1) | Kao Kuo-Hao (5/5) | —N/a | Mike Singletary (Braves) (1/1) | |
| 12 | Tsai Wen-Cheng (1/1) | Randall Walko (1/2) | Chieng Li-Huan (3/4) | Lin Yao-Tsung (1/1) | Hasheem Thabeet (Lioneers) (1/2) | |
| 13 | —N/a | Randall Walko (2/2) | Chieng Li-Huan (4/4) | Shih Chin-Yao (4/6) | Branden Dawson (Lioneers) (1/2) | |
| 14 | Joseph Lin (2/3) | Lin Chun-Chi (3/3) | Tien Hao (2/3) | Shih Chin-Yao (5/6) | Branden Dawson (Lioneers) (2/2) | |
| 15 | Joseph Lin (3/3) | Tien Lei (1/1) | Tien Hao (3/3) | Shih Chin-Yao (6/6) | Hasheem Thabeet (Lioneers) (2/2) | |

=== Players of the Month ===
| Month | Recipient | Ref |
|---|---|---|
| December | Chang Tsung-Hsien (Taipei Fubon Braves) (1/1) | |
| January | Anthony Tucker (Formosa Taishin Dreamers) (1/1) | |
| February | Lin Chun-Chi (Formosa Taishin Dreamers) (1/1) | |
| March | Hasheem Thabeet (Hsinchu JKO Lioneers) (1/1) | |
| April | Shih Chin-Yao (Taoyuan Pilots) (1/1) | |

== Arenas ==
- The Hsinchu Lioneers announced on September 8, 2020, that they would play their home games at Hsinchu County Stadium.
- The Taoyuan announced on November 14, 2020, that they would play their home games at Taoyuan Arena.
- The Formosa Dreamers scheduled last four of their home games at National Taiwan University of Sport Gymnasium. On March 15, the Dreamers resumed their last two home games back to Changhua County Stadium for Tien Lei's retiring weekend.

== Media ==
The games will be aired on television via FTV One and MOMOTV, and will be broadcast online on YouTube Official Channel and 4gTV.
