= 2021 P. League+ playoffs =

Taiwanese basketball tournament

Tournament details
- Dates: April 23 – May 15, 2021
- Season: 2020–21
- Teams: 3

Final positions
- Champions: Taipei Fubon Braves (1st title)
- Runner-up: Formosa Taishin Dreamers

The 2021 P. League+ playoffs was the postseason tournament of the 2020–21 P. League+ season. The playoffs began on April 23 and was early ended on May 15 due to the Taiwanese pandemic restrictions after Game 4 of the 2021 P. League+ finals. The Taipei Fubon Braves, leading 3–1 in the finals, was declared the champion after the remaining finals games were cancelled.

== Format ==
The top three seed qualify the playoffs. The second and third seeds play the best-of-five playoffs series, which is in a 2-2-1 format. The winner advances and plays the top seed in the best-of-seven finals series, which is in a 2-2-1-1-1 format. The seeding is based on each team's regular season record. Home court advantage goes to the higher seed for both series.

== Playoff qualifying ==
Seed	Team	Record	Clinched	
Seed	Team	Record	Playoff berth	Best record in PLG
1	Taipei Fubon Braves	19–5	February 27	March 21
2	Taoyuan Pilots	10–14	April 3	—
3	Formosa Taishin Dreamers	10–14	March 27	—

== Bracket ==
Playoffs			Finals
			**1**	**Braves**	**3**
2	Pilots	2	3	Dreamers	1
**3**	**Dreamers**	**3**

Bold: series winner
Italic: team with home-court advantage

== Playoffs: (2) Taoyuan Pilots vs. (3) Formosa Taishin Dreamers ==
April 23
7:00pm

Boxscore

**Formosa Taishin Dreamers** **102**, Taoyuan Pilots 63
Scoring by quarter: **29**–11, **18**–15, **20**–14, **35**–23
Pts: Stephan Hicks 27; Rebs: Stephan Hicks 19; Asts: Lee Te-Wei 5	Pts: Jordan Chatman 13; Rebs: Lin Yao-Tsung 9 Asts: Kuan Ta-You 5
**Dreamers leads series, 1–0**

Taoyuan Arena, Taoyuan City
Attendance: 2,977
Referees: Hsieh Wen-Wei, Wang Li-Chang, Yu Hao-Ping

April 25
5:00pm

Boxscore

Formosa Taishin Dreamers 86, **Taoyuan Pilots** **91**
Scoring by quarter: **23**–21, **25**–24, **24**–16, 14–**30**
Pts: Stephan Hicks 21; Rebs: Stephan Hicks 18; Asts: Anthony Tucker 6	Pts: Jordan Chatman 21; Rebs: Quincy Davis 16; Asts: Chatman, Davis 5 each
**Series tied, 1–1**

Taoyuan Arena, Taoyuan City
Attendance: 4,758
Referees: Lai Jian-Zhong, Huang Chen-Feng, Lin Ying-Feng

April 28
7:00pm

Boxscore

**Taoyuan Pilots** **82**, Formosa Taishin Dreamers 79
Scoring by quarter: 23–**24**, 20–**24**, 9–**19**, **30**–12
Pts: Jordan Chatman 23; Rebs: Quincy Davis 12; Asts: Chatman, Lin Y. 5 each	Pts: Stephan Hicks 21; Rebs: Stephan Hicks 19; Asts: Yang C., Young 5 each
**Pilots leads series, 2–1**

Changhua County Stadium, Changhua County
Attendance: 3,612
Referees: Hung Yung-Yu, Yeh Chun-Hung, Luo Kuo-Hsien

April 30
7:00pm

Boxscore

Taoyuan Pilots 74, **Formosa Taishin Dreamers** **103**
Scoring by quarter: 7–**33**, 17–**19**, 22–**34**, **28**–17
Pts: Jordan Chatman 26; Rebs: Lin Yao-Tsung 9 Asts: Kuan Ta-You 4	Pts: Stephan Hicks 39; Rebs: Stephan Hicks 17; Asts: Lin, Young 8 each
**Series tied, 2–2**

Changhua County Stadium, Changhua County
Attendance: 4,015
Referees: Lai Jian-Zhong, Huang Chen-Feng, Chen Chao-Ying

May 2
5:00pm

Boxscore

**Formosa Taishin Dreamers** **93**, Taoyuan Pilots 91
Scoring by quarter: **33**–26, 14–**20**, **25**–14, 21–**31**
Pts: Jerran Young 42; Rebs: Jerran Young 11; Asts: Hicks, Lee, Lin 5 each	Pts: Jordan Chatman 21; Rebs: Quincy Davis 10; Asts: Lin Yao-Tsung 9
**Dreamers wins series, 3–2**

Changhua County Stadium, Changhua County
Attendance: 3,003
Referees: Hsieh Wen-Wei, Hung Yung-Yu, Huang Chen-Feng

Regular-season series
Pilots won 5–3 in the regular-season series

December 20, 2020

Boxscore

**Taoyuan Pilots** **103**, Formosa Taishin Dreamers 83

Changhua County Stadium, Changhua County

January 3, 2021

Boxscore

Formosa Taishin Dreamers 100, **Taoyuan Pilots** **104**

Taoyuan Arena, Taoyuan City

January 17, 2021

Boxscore

Formosa Taishin Dreamers 86, **Taoyuan Pilots** **90**

Taoyuan Arena, Taoyuan City

January 23, 2021

Boxscore

Formosa Taishin Dreamers 84, **Taoyuan Pilots** **89**

Taoyuan Arena, Taoyuan City

February 21, 2021

Boxscore

**Formosa Taishin Dreamers** **102**, Taoyuan Pilots 99

Taoyuan Arena, Taoyuan City

February 28, 2021

Boxscore

Taoyuan Pilots 90, **Formosa Taishin Dreamers** **98**

Changhua County Stadium, Changhua County

March 21, 2021

Boxscore

Taoyuan Pilots 100, **Formosa Taishin Dreamers** **107**

National Taiwan University of Sport Gymnasium, Taichung City

April 3, 2021

Boxscore

**Taoyuan Pilots** **106**, Formosa Taishin Dreamers 95

Changhua County Stadium, Changhua County

== P. League+ finals: (1) Taipei Fubon Braves vs. (3) Formosa Taishin Dreamers ==
May 7
7:00pm

Boxscore

**Formosa Taishin Dreamers** **114**, Taipei Fubon Braves 109
Scoring by quarter: **31**–28, **27**–25, 25–**30**, **31**–26
Pts: Stephan Hicks 42; Rebs: Stephan Hicks 17; Asts: Yang Chin-Min 10	Pts: Singletary, Zaytsev 23 each Rebs: Ihor Zaytsev 15; Asts: Lin C., Singletary 8 each
**Dreamers leads series, 1–0**

Taipei Heping Basketball Gymnasium, Taipei City
Attendance: 7,000
Referees: Lai Jian-Zhong, Yang He-Ping, Chen Chao-Ying

May 9
5:00pm

Boxscore

Formosa Taishin Dreamers 82, **Taipei Fubon Braves** **106**
Scoring by quarter: 18–**27**, 21–**28**, 22–**29**, 21–**22**
Pts: Stephan Hicks 19; Rebs: Anthony Tucker 13; Asts: Anthony Tucker 10	Pts: Mike Singletary 29; Rebs: Mike Singletary 12; Asts: Mike Singletary 8
**Series tied, 1–1**

Taipei Heping Basketball Gymnasium, Taipei City
Attendance: 7,000
Referees: Hsieh Wen-Wei, Huang Chen-Feng, Lin Ying-Feng

May 13
7:00pm

Boxscore

**Taipei Fubon Braves** **114**, Formosa Taishin Dreamers 110 (OT)
Scoring by quarter: **24**–15, 28–**32**, **35**–31, 14–**23**, Overtime: **13**–9
Pts: Chang Tsung-Hsien 25; Rebs: Mike Singletary 16; Asts: Mike Singletary 12	Pts: Stephan Hicks 31; Rebs: Stephan Hicks 18; Asts: Lee Te-Wei 6
**Braves leads series, 2–1**

Changhua County Stadium, Changhua County
Attendance: 0
Referees: Hung Yung-Yu, Wang Li-Chang, Yu Hao-Ping

May 15
7:00pm

Boxscore

**Taipei Fubon Braves** **115**, Formosa Taishin Dreamers 90
Scoring by quarter: **33**–23, **27**–15, **31**–20, 24–**32**
Pts: Ihor Zaytsev 25; Rebs: Ihor Zaytsev 17; Asts: J. Lin, Singletary 9 each	Pts: Stephan Hicks 33; Rebs: Stephan Hicks 17; Asts: Kenneth Chien 8
**Braves leads series, 3–1**

Changhua County Stadium, Changhua County
Attendance: 0
Referees: Hsieh Wen-Wei, Yeh Chun-Hung, Luo Kuo-Hsien

Regular-season series
Braves won 6–2 in the regular-season series

December 19, 2020

Boxscore

**Taipei Fubon Braves** **89**, Formosa Taishin Dreamers 86

Changhua County Stadium, Changhua County

January 16, 2021

Boxscore

Formosa Taishin Dreamers 95, **Taipei Fubon Braves** **115**

Taipei Heping Basketball Gymnasium, Taipei City

January 31, 2021

Boxscore

**Taipei Fubon Braves** **111**, Formosa Taishin Dreamers 84

Changhua County Stadium, Changhua County

February 6, 2021

Boxscore

Taipei Fubon Braves 91, **Formosa Taishin Dreamers** **100**

Changhua County Stadium, Changhua County

February 27, 2021

Boxscore

Taipei Fubon Braves 89, **Formosa Taishin Dreamers** **101**

Changhua County Stadium, Changhua County

March 6, 2021

Boxscore

Formosa Taishin Dreamers 104, **Taipei Fubon Braves** **114**

Taipei Heping Basketball Gymnasium, Taipei City

March 13, 2021

Boxscore

Formosa Taishin Dreamers 94, **Taipei Fubon Braves** **99**

Taipei Heping Basketball Gymnasium, Taipei City

March 28, 2021

Boxscore

Formosa Taishin Dreamers 106, **Taipei Fubon Braves** **110**

Taipei Heping Basketball Gymnasium, Taipei City
