= 2021 P. League+ finals =

Team	Coach	Wins
Taipei Fubon Braves	Hsu Chin-Che	3
Formosa Taishin Dreamers	Kyle Julius	1
- Dates: May 7–15
- MVP: Mike Singletary (Taipei Fubon Braves)

The 2021 P. League+ finals was the championship series of the P. League+'s (PLG) 2020–21 season and conclusion of the season's playoffs. The finals began on May 7 and was early ended on May 15 due to the Taiwanese pandemic restrictions after game 4. The Taipei Fubon Braves, leading 3–1 in the finals, was declared the champion after the remaining finals games were cancelled.

== Background ==
=== Road to the finals ===
Team	GP	W	L	PCT
z – Taipei Fubon Braves	24	19	5	.792
x – Taoyuan Pilots	24	10	14	.417
x – Formosa Taishin Dreamers	24	10	14	.417
Hsinchu JKO Lioneers	24	9	15	.375

Notes

- z – Clinched home court advantage for the entire playoffs
- x – Clinched playoff spot

Playoff results
Taipei Fubon Braves		Formosa Taishin Dreamers
N/A	Playoffs	Defeated the 2nd-seeded Taoyuan Pilots, 3–2

=== Regular season series ===
The Braves won the regular season series 6–2.

December 19, 2020

Boxscore

Taipei Fubon Braves 89, Formosa Taishin Dreamers 86

Changhua County Stadium, Changhua County

January 16, 2021

Boxscore

Formosa Taishin Dreamers 95, Taipei Fubon Braves 115

Taipei Heping Basketball Gymnasium, Taipei City

January 31, 2021

Boxscore

Taipei Fubon Braves 111, Formosa Taishin Dreamers 84

Changhua County Stadium, Changhua County

February 6, 2021

Boxscore

Taipei Fubon Braves 91, Formosa Taishin Dreamers 100

Changhua County Stadium, Changhua County

February 27, 2021

Boxscore

Taipei Fubon Braves 89, Formosa Taishin Dreamers 101

Changhua County Stadium, Changhua County

March 6, 2021

Boxscore

Formosa Taishin Dreamers 104, Taipei Fubon Braves 114

Taipei Heping Basketball Gymnasium, Taipei City

March 13, 2021

Boxscore

Formosa Taishin Dreamers 94, Taipei Fubon Braves 99

Taipei Heping Basketball Gymnasium, Taipei City

March 28, 2021

Boxscore

Formosa Taishin Dreamers 106, Taipei Fubon Braves 110

Taipei Heping Basketball Gymnasium, Taipei City

== Series summary ==
Game	Date	Away team	Result	Home team
Game 1	Friday, May 7	Formosa Taishin Dreamers	114–109 (1–0)	Taipei Fubon Braves
Game 2	Sunday, May 9	Formosa Taishin Dreamers	82–106 (1–1)	Taipei Fubon Braves
Game 3	Thursday, May 13	Taipei Fubon Braves	114–110 (OT) (2–1)	Formosa Taishin Dreamers
Game 4	Saturday, May 15	Taipei Fubon Braves	115–90 (3–1)	Formosa Taishin Dreamers

== Game summaries ==
=== Game 1 ===
May 7
7:00pm

Boxscore

Formosa Taishin Dreamers 114, Taipei Fubon Braves 109
Scoring by quarter: 31–28, 27–25, 25–30, 31–26
Pts: Stephan Hicks 42; Rebs: Stephan Hicks 17; Asts: Yang Chin-Min 10	Pts: Singletary, Zaytsev 23 each Rebs: Ihor Zaytsev 15; Asts: Lin C., Singletary 8 each
Dreamers leads series, 1–0

Taipei Heping Basketball Gymnasium, Taipei City
Attendance: 7,000
Referees: Lai Jian-Zhong, Yang He-Ping, Chen Chao-Ying

=== Game 2 ===
May 9
5:00pm

Boxscore

Formosa Taishin Dreamers 82, Taipei Fubon Braves 106
Scoring by quarter: 18–27, 21–28, 22–29, 21–22
Pts: Stephan Hicks 19; Rebs: Anthony Tucker 13; Asts: Anthony Tucker 10	Pts: Mike Singletary 29; Rebs: Mike Singletary 12; Asts: Mike Singletary 8
Series tied, 1–1

Taipei Heping Basketball Gymnasium, Taipei City
Attendance: 7,000
Referees: Hsieh Wen-Wei, Huang Chen-Feng, Lin Ying-Feng

=== Game 3 ===
May 13
7:00pm

Boxscore

Taipei Fubon Braves 114, Formosa Taishin Dreamers 110 (OT)
Scoring by quarter: 24–15, 28–32, 35–31, 14–23, Overtime: 13–9
Pts: Chang Tsung-Hsien 25; Rebs: Mike Singletary 16; Asts: Mike Singletary 12	Pts: Stephan Hicks 31; Rebs: Stephan Hicks 18; Asts: Lee Te-Wei 6
Braves leads series, 2–1

Changhua County Stadium, Changhua County
Attendance: 0
Referees: Hung Yung-Yu, Wang Li-Chang, Yu Hao-Ping

=== Game 4 ===
May 15
7:00pm

Boxscore

Taipei Fubon Braves 115, Formosa Taishin Dreamers 90
Scoring by quarter: 33–23, 27–15, 31–20, 24–32
Pts: Ihor Zaytsev 25; Rebs: Ihor Zaytsev 17; Asts: J. Lin, Singletary 9 each	Pts: Stephan Hicks 33; Rebs: Stephan Hicks 17; Asts: Kenneth Chien 8
Braves leads series, 3–1

Changhua County Stadium, Changhua County
Attendance: 0
Referees: Hsieh Wen-Wei, Yeh Chun-Hung, Luo Kuo-Hsien

== Rosters ==
=== Taipei Fubon Braves ===
2020–21 Taipei Fubon Braves roster
Players
Coaches

Pos.	No.	Nat.	Name	Ht.	Wt.	Age	From
G	0	(Chinese Taipei)	Lai Ting-En	1.76 m (5 ft 9 in)	70 kg (154 lb)	28 – 22 July 1996	FJU
G	1	(United States) (Chinese Taipei)	Joseph Lin	1.82 m (6 ft 0 in)	69 kg (152 lb)	32 – 21 June 1992	Hamilton
G	2	(Chinese Taipei)	Chien Wei-Ju	1.85 m (6 ft 1 in)	80 kg (176 lb)	33 – 20 January 1992	NTNU
G	3	(Chinese Taipei)	Chang Tsung-Hsien	1.92 m (6 ft 4 in)	86 kg (190 lb)	36 – 27 December 1988	BYU-Hawaii
G	6	(Chinese Taipei) (Australia)	Oscar Lin	1.83 m (6 ft 0 in)	90 kg (198 lb)	29 – 21 August 1995	UCH
F	7	(Chinese Taipei)	Chang Po-Wei	1.90 m (6 ft 3 in)	88 kg (194 lb)	34 – 22 July 1990	NTUA
F	8	(Chinese Taipei)	Chou Kuei-Yu	1.93 m (6 ft 4 in)	95 kg (209 lb)	26 – 19 July 1998	NTNU
F	9	(Chinese Taipei)	Kuo Shao-Chieh	1.90 m (6 ft 3 in)	80 kg (176 lb)	34 – 9 April 1990	TNU
F	12	(Chinese Taipei)	Lin Chih-Chieh	1.92 m (6 ft 4 in)	92 kg (203 lb)	42 – 11 June 1982	PCCU
F	13	(Chinese Taipei)	Lin Meng-Hsueh	1.95 m (6 ft 5 in)	88 kg (194 lb)	32 – 14 October 1992	NTSU
F	14	(Chinese Taipei)	Tsai Wen-Cheng (C)	1.90 m (6 ft 3 in)	96 kg (212 lb)	39 – 31 May 1985	NCUE
F	17	(United States)	Mike Singletary (I)	1.98 m (6 ft 6 in)	103 kg (227 lb)	36 – 19 September 1988	Texas Tech
C	21	(Chinese Taipei)	Tseng Hsiang-Chun	2.05 m (6 ft 9 in)	95 kg (209 lb)	26 – 8 August 1998	FJU
C	23	(Saint Vincent and the Grenadines)	Brendon Smart	1.98 m (6 ft 6 in)	95 kg (209 lb)	29 – 5 October 1995	UCH
C	32	(Ukraine)	Ihor Zaytsev (I)	2.11 m (6 ft 11 in)	110 kg (243 lb)	35 – 11 May 1989	Ukraine
F	36	(Belize) (United States)	Charles García (I)	2.04 m (6 ft 8 in)	108 kg (238 lb)	36 – 13 October 1988	Seattle
C	76	(Chinese Taipei)	Tseng Wen-Ting	2.04 m (6 ft 8 in)	97 kg (214 lb)	40 – 6 July 1984	TPEC

Head coach

- (Chinese Taipei) Hsu Chin-Che

Assistant coach(es)

- (Chinese Taipei) Wu Yung-Jen
- (Chinese Taipei) Lin Wei-Hao
- (Chinese Taipei) Chiang Chih-Cheng
- (Chinese Taipei) Wei Wei

Strength & conditioning coach(es)

- (Chinese Taipei) Jheng Wei-Syuan

Athletic trainer(s)

- (Chinese Taipei) Lin Wu-Chang

Legend

- (C) Team captain
- (I) Import player
- Injured

=== Formosa Taishin Dreamers ===
2020–21 Formosa Taishin Dreamers roster
Players
Coaches

Pos.	No.	Nat.	Name	Ht.	Wt.	Age	From
G	0	(Chinese Taipei)	Chen Jen-Jei	1.83 m (6 ft 0 in)	83 kg (183 lb)	27 – 16 September 1997	Grand View
F/C	1	(Chinese Taipei)	Tien Lei	2.03 m (6 ft 8 in)	103 kg (227 lb)	41 – 1 June 1983	NTNU
G	2	(United States)	Anthony Tucker (I)	1.93 m (6 ft 4 in)	93 kg (205 lb)	35 – 2 September 1989	Minnesota
G/F	6	(Chinese Taipei)	Yang Chin-Min	1.90 m (6 ft 3 in)	98 kg (216 lb)	41 – 22 January 1984	FJU
C	10	(Chinese Taipei)	Wang Po-Chih	1.95 m (6 ft 5 in)	130 kg (287 lb)	28 – 29 October 1996	NTSU
G	11	(Chinese Taipei)	Lin Chun-Chi	1.73 m (5 ft 8 in)	70 kg (154 lb)	27 – 29 January 1998	UCH
F	12	(United States)	Jerran Young (I)	1.98 m (6 ft 6 in)	99 kg (218 lb)	33 – 25 December 1991	Wright State
F/C	13	(Chinese Taipei) (United Kingdom)	Jonah Morrison	2.05 m (6 ft 9 in)	105 kg (231 lb)	24 – 2 June 2000	UBC
F/C	17	(United States)	Stephan Hicks (I)	1.98 m (6 ft 6 in)	100 kg (220 lb)	32 – 2 April 1992	Cal State Northridge
G	18	(Chinese Taipei)	Yang Shen-Yen	1.78 m (5 ft 10 in)	80 kg (176 lb)	28 – 18 January 1997	NTSU
F	20	(United States) (Chinese Taipei)	Derek King	1.90 m (6 ft 3 in)	90 kg (198 lb)	33 – 13 September 1991	UC Berkeley
G/F	23	(United States) (Chinese Taipei)	Kenneth Chien	1.85 m (6 ft 1 in)	86 kg (190 lb)	30 – 6 February 1995	Broward
F	24	(United States) (Chinese Taipei)	Randall Walko	1.96 m (6 ft 5 in)	93 kg (205 lb)	26 – 21 September 1998	TCNJ
C	26	(Chinese Taipei)	Lee Te-Wei	2.00 m (6 ft 7 in)	115 kg (254 lb)	33 – 15 October 1991	NRVS
G	30	(Chinese Taipei)	Wu Sung-Wei	1.82 m (6 ft 0 in)	80 kg (176 lb)	31 – 21 May 1993	ISU

Head coach

- (Canada) Kyle Julius

Assistant coach(es)

- (Chinese Taipei) Liu Wen-He
- (Chinese Taipei) Lai Po-Lin

Athletic trainer(s)

- (Chinese Taipei) Wang Yu-Chih
- (Chinese Taipei) Hou Yao-Hsin

Team manager

- (Chinese Taipei) Lin Wu Cheng-Lin

Legend

- (C) Team captain
- (I) Import player
- Injured

== Player statistics ==
Legend
GP	Games played	MPG	Minutes per game	2P%	2-point field goal percentage
3P%	3-point field goal percentage	FT%	Free throw percentage	RPG	Rebounds per game
APG	Assists per game	SPG	Steals per game	BPG	Blocks per game
PPG	Points per game

Taipei Fubon Braves

Player	GP	MPG	PPG	2P%	3P%	FT%	RPG	APG	SPG	BPG
Chang Tsung-Hsien	4	33:23	19.00	50.00%	29.63%	66.67%	3.00	3.75	2.00	0.25
Chien Wei-Ju	4	15:38	4.75	33.33%	23.81%	0.00%	2.25	1.50	1.25	0.00
Chou Kuei-Yu	2	09:10	1.00	0.00%	0.00%	100.00%	1.00	1.00	0.00	0.00
Lai Ting-En	3	08:47	3.00	42.86%	16.67%	0.00%	1.33	0.67	1.00	0.00
Lin Chih-Chieh	4	23:43	8.25	46.15%	21.43%	75.00%	4.25	4.25	0.25	0.00
Joseph Lin	4	17:24	4.75	50.00%	16.67%	66.67%	2.50	4.25	0.25	0.25
Lin Meng-Hsueh	4	21:56	6.00	47.06%	33.33%	100.00%	4.25	1.00	0.75	0.50
Mike Singletary	4	37:44	23.25	59.46%	34.21%	76.92%	12.25	9.25	1.25	0.00
Brendon Smart	2	14:02	6.00	37.50%	66.67%	0.00%	4.50	0.50	0.50	0.50
Tsai Wen-Cheng	4	14:22	8.00	52.38%	22.22%	100.00%	3.75	0.75	1.00	0.00
Tseng Hsiang-Chun	3	18:27	4.67	33.33%	0.00%	100.00%	4.67	0.33	0.67	0.00
Tseng Wen-Ting	4	14:51	3.75	54.55%	16.67%	0.00%	3.25	1.75	0.25	0.00
Ihor Zaytsev	4	35:09	24.00	67.35%	71.43%	83.33%	13.75	2.50	0.75	0.50

Formosa Taishin Dreamers

Player	GP	MPG	PPG	2P%	3P%	FT%	RPG	APG	SPG	BPG
Chen Jen-Jei	4	19:44	9.75	38.46%	34.62%	100.00%	3.00	0.50	0.25	0.00
Kenneth Chien	4	35:47	9.25	41.94%	23.08%	25.00%	1.75	3.25	1.00	0.50
Stephan Hicks	4	40:46	31.25	62.00%	29.27%	71.05%	14.25	1.75	1.25	0.75
Lee Te-Wei	4	35:30	10.00	42.86%	36.36%	57.14%	8.50	3.25	1.50	1.75
Lin Chun-Chi	4	14:18	3.75	50.00%	23.08%	100.00%	1.75	1.00	0.50	0.00
Anthony Tucker	1	38:08	17.00	66.67%	60.00%	0.00%	13.00	10.00	2.00	1.00
Randall Walko	4	24:22	8.00	30.00%	28.57%	72.73%	3.25	1.25	0.50	0.75
Wang Po-Chih	4	13:26	5.00	60.00%	0.00%	100.00%	3.50	0.50	0.25	0.00
Wu Sung-Wei	3	06:36	1.00	0.00%	14.29%	0.00%	0.00	0.00	0.33	0.00
Yang Chin-Min	4	35:22	12.25	70.00%	35.71%	83.33%	5.75	5.00	1.50	0.25
Yang Shen-Yen	1	11:50	3.00	0.00%	25.00%	0.00%	0.00	1.00	0.00	0.00
Jerran Young	2	19:02	8.00	71.43%	50.00%	0.00%	2.00	2.00	1.00	0.00
