= 2021–22 Formosa Taishin Dreamers season =

Taiwanese professional basketball season

Formosa Taishin Dreamers
2021-22 season
- President: Chang Cheng-Chung
- General Manager: Han Chun-Kai
- Head Coach: Kyle Julius
- Arena: Intercontinental Basketball Stadium
- P. League+: 19-11 (.633)
- Playoffs: Playoffs (lost to Braves 1–3)
- Scoring leader: Julian Boyd (18.60)
- Rebounding leader: Julian Boyd (11.35)
- Assists leader: Lin Chun-Chi (4.20)
- Highest home attendance: 3,000 (15 games)
- Lowest home attendance: 3,000 (15 games)
- Average home attendance: 3,000
- Biggest win: Dreamers 126-87 Kings (April 16, 2022)
- Biggest defeat: Dreamers 64-84 Kings (December 11, 2021); Dreamers 101-121 Braves (March 12, 2022)
Home	Away	City
City(Playoffs)	Taishin
- All statistics correct as of June 6, 2022.

The 2021–22 Formosa Taishin Dreamers season was the franchise's 5th season, its second season in the P. LEAGUE+ (PLG). The Dreamers are coached by Kyle Julius in his third year as head coach.

The Dreamers play their home games in Intercontinental Basketball Stadium this season due to the renovation of Changhua County Stadium.

== Draft ==
Round	Pick	Player	Position	Status	School/club team
2	11	Wang Wei-Cheng	G	Local	NKNU
3	14	Wang Chen-Yuan	G	Local	NCCU

The Dreamers' 2021 first-round draft pick was traded to Kaohsiung Steelers in exchange for cash considerations. On July 29, 2021, Dreamers announced that the second rounder, Wang Wei-Cheng has forfeited to sign.

== Standings ==
Team	GP	W	L	PCT
z − Hsinchu JKO Lioneers	30	20	10	.667
x − Formosa Taishin Dreamers	30	19	11	.633
x − Taipei Fubon Braves	30	18	12	.600
x − New Taipei Kings	30	16	14	.533
Kaohsiung Steelers	29	9	20	.310
Taoyuan Pilots	29	7	22	.241

== Roster ==
Note: Flags indicate national team eligibility at FIBA-sanctioned events. Players may hold other non-FIBA nationalities not displayed.

2021–22 Formosa Taishin Dreamers roster
Players
Coaches

Pos.	No.	Nat.	Name	Ht.	Wt.	Age	From
G	0	(Chinese Taipei)	Chen Jen-Jei	1.83 m (6 ft 0 in)	79 kg (174 lb)	27 – 16 September 1997	Grand View
F	7	(Chinese Taipei) (United States)	Chieng Li-Huan	1.90 m (6 ft 3 in)	90 kg (198 lb)	37 – 5 March 1988	NCTU
G	8	(Chinese Taipei)	Wang Chen-Yuan	1.76 m (5 ft 9 in)	70 kg (154 lb)	26 – 2 September 1998	NCCU
G	11	(Chinese Taipei)	Lin Chun-Chi	1.75 m (5 ft 9 in)	70 kg (154 lb)	27 – 29 January 1998	Chien Hsin Tech
G	14	(Chinese Taipei)	Wu Yung-Sheng	1.86 m (6 ft 1 in)	82 kg (181 lb)	28 – 19 October 1996	Sacramento State
G	18	(Chinese Taipei)	Yang Shen-Yen	1.78 m (5 ft 10 in)	80 kg (176 lb)	28 – 18 January 1997	NTSU
F	21	(Chinese Taipei) (United States)	Douglas Creighton	2.00 m (6 ft 7 in)	90 kg (198 lb)	40 – 7 March 1985	Madonna
F	23	(United States) (Chinese Taipei)	Kenneth Chien	1.85 m (6 ft 1 in)	86 kg (190 lb)	30 – 6 February 1995	Broward
F	24	(United States) (Chinese Taipei)	Randall Walko (injured)	1.96 m (6 ft 5 in)	93 kg (205 lb)	26 – 21 September 1998	TCNJ
C	26	(Chinese Taipei)	Lee Te-Wei	2.00 m (6 ft 7 in)	105 kg (231 lb)	33 – 15 October 1991	NRVS
G	30	(Chinese Taipei)	Wu Sung-Wei	1.82 m (6 ft 0 in)	82 kg (181 lb)	31 – 21 May 1993	I-Shou
F/C	33	(Serbia) (Canada)	Stefan Jankovic (injured) (I)	2.11 m (6 ft 11 in)	109 kg (240 lb)	31 – 4 August 1993	Hawaiʻi
C	34	(United States)	Brandon Gilbeck (I)	2.13 m (7 ft 0 in)	107 kg (236 lb)	28 – 9 December 1996	Western Illinois
F	42	(United States)	Julian Boyd (I)	2.03 m (6 ft 8 in)	104 kg (229 lb)	35 – 2 February 1990	LIU Brooklyn
C	97	(Chinese Taipei)	Cheng Tzu-Yang	2.05 m (6 ft 9 in)	110 kg (243 lb)	29 – 22 November 1995	Chinese Culture

Head coach

- (Canada) Kyle Julius

Assistant coach(es)

- (Chinese Taipei) Liu Wen-He
- (Chinese Taipei) Lai Po-Lin
- (Netherlands) Thomas Roijakkers

Strength & conditioning coach(es)

- (Chinese Taipei) Tsai Ming-Ta
- (Chinese Taipei) Lin Hao-Chun

Athletic trainer(s)

- (Chinese Taipei) Hou Yao-Hsin

Team manager

- (Chinese Taipei) Wang Yu-Chih

Legend

- (C) Team captain
- (I) Import player
- Injured

- Roster
Updated: 28 March 2022

== Game log ==
=== Taiwan 3x3 Basketball Association ===
==== Round 1 ====
September 4
2:00pm

Taoyuan Fighters 20, Taishin Dreamers 19

Pingzhen Sports Center, Taoyuan City

September 4
4:00pm

Style Aesthetic Clinic 22, Taishin Dreamers 16

Pingzhen Sports Center, Taoyuan City

==== Round 2 ====
September 18
2:15pm

Taishin Dreamers 22, Unity Credit Investigation 19

Chaoma Sports Center, Taichung City

September 18
3:15pm

Taishin Dreamers 19, Chang Jia M&E 21

Chaoma Sports Center, Taichung City

September 19
2:00pm

Tai-Ning Skywalker 21, Taishin Dreamers 13

Chaoma Sports Center, Taichung City

==== Round 3 ====
September 25
2:15pm

Taishin Dreamers 21, DLIVE 11

Xindian Sports Center, New Taipei City

September 25
3:15pm

Taishin Dreamers 21, Hsinchu Lioneers 15

Xindian Sports Center, New Taipei City

September 26
2:45pm

Taishin Dreamers 21, X-Line Fitness 13

Xindian Sports Center, New Taipei City

September 26
3:40pm

Hsinchu Lioneers 21, Taishin Dreamers 20

Xindian Sports Center, New Taipei City

==== Round 4 ====
October 2
2:15pm

Taishin Dreamers 14, Kaohsiung Hanshin 137 21

Pingzhen Sports Center, Taoyuan City

October 2
3:15pm

Taishin Dreamers 21, DLIVE 10

Pingzhen Sports Center, Taoyuan City

October 3
2:30pm

Style Aesthetic Clinic 21, Taishin Dreamers 17

Pingzhen Sports Center, Taoyuan City

==== Round 5 ====
October 9
2:15pm

Taishin Dreamers 14, X-Line Fitness 21

Taipei Heping Basketball Gymnasium, Taipei City

October 9
3:15pm

Taishin Dreamers 21, Chang Jia M&E 19

Taipei Heping Basketball Gymnasium, Taipei City

October 10
2:30pm

Tai-Ning Skywalker 21, Taishin Dreamers 17

Taipei Heping Basketball Gymnasium, Taipei City

==== Round 6 ====
October 16
2:15pm

Style Aesthetic Clinic 21, Taishin Dreamers 19

Bade Sports Center, Taoyuan City

October 16
4:15pm

Taishin Dreamers 19, Hsinchu Lioneers 21

Bade Sports Center, Taoyuan City

==== Round 7 ====
October 23
2:15pm

Taishin Dreamers 21, Unity Credit Investigation 11

Pingzhen Sports Center, Taoyuan City

October 23
3:15pm

Taishin Dreamers 18, Jeoutai Technology 21

Pingzhen Sports Center, Taoyuan City

October 24
2:30pm

Kaohsiung Hanshin 137 21, Taishin Dreamers 17

Pingzhen Sports Center, Taoyuan City

==== Final ====
October 30
4:15pm

Tai-Ning Skywalker 21, Taishin Dreamers 15

Chaoma Sports Center, Taichung City

=== Preseason ===
2021 preseason game log Total: 3-1 (home: 2–0; road: 1–1)
Game	Date	Team	Score	High points	High rebounds	High assists	Location Attendance	Record
1	November 13	@Kaohsiung Steelers	W 102-89	Douglas Creighton (18)	Brandon Gilbeck (13)	Wu Yung-Sheng (6)	Fengshan Arena; 4,125	1-0
2	November 14	Taoyuan Pilots	W 90-88	Brandon Gilbeck (18)	Brandon Gilbeck (10)	Kenneth Chien (4)	Fengshan Arena; 4,866	2-0
3	November 20	New Taipei Kings	W 89-87	Chen Jen-Jei (16)	Brandon Gilbeck (13)	Wu Yung-Sheng (5)	National Taiwan University Sports Center; 2,955	3-0
4	November 21	@Hsinchu JKO Lioneers	L 94-109	Chen Jen-Jei (19)	Kenneth Chien (9)	Lin Chin-Chi (5)	National Taiwan University Sports Center; 3,087	3-1

=== Regular season ===
2021–22 regular season game log Total: 19-11 (home: 11–4; road: 8–7)
Game	Date	Team	Score	High points	High rebounds	High assists	Location Attendance	Record
1	December 4	@Taipei Fubon Braves	W 111-108	Kenneth Chien (30)	Kenneth Chien (8)	Wu Yung-Sheng (8)	Taipei Heping Basketball Gymnasium; 6,788	1-0
2	December 11	New Taipei Kings	L 64-84	Ricky Ledo (20)	Brandon Gilbeck (11)	Lin Chun-Chi (3)	Intercontinental Basketball Stadium; 3,000	1-1
3	December 12	Taoyuan Pilots	W 95-92 (OT)	Julian Boyd (23)	Julian Boyd (10)	Lin Chun-Chi (7)	Intercontinental Basketball Stadium; 3,000	2-1
4	December 19	@New Taipei Kings	L 89-94	Wu Yung-Sheng (17)	Randall Walko (8)	Lin Chun-Chi (9)	Xinzhuang Gymnasium; 3,328	2-2
5	December 25	@Kaohsiung Steelers	W 106-104	Kenneth Chien (20)	Brandon Gilbeck (22)	Randall Walko (6)	Fengshan Arena; 5,013	3-2
6	January 7	Taipei Fubon Braves	W 86-80	Lee Te-Wei (24)	Randall Walko (10); Julian Boyd (10)	Lin Chun-Chi (6)	Intercontinental Basketball Stadium; 3,000	4-2
7	January 9	@Hsinchu JKO Lioneers	L 80-86 (OT)	Lin Chun-Chi (15); Wu Yung-Sheng (15); Julian Boyd (15)	Kenneth Chien (13); Julian Boyd (13)	Kenneth Chien (5)	Hsinchu County Stadium; 5,521	4-3
8	January 15	Hsinchu JKO Lioneers	W 84-78	Kenneth Chien (25)	Brandon Gilbeck (15)	Randall Walko (4)	Intercontinental Basketball Stadium; 3,000	5-3
9	January 16	Kaohsiung Steelers	W 89-82	Julian Boyd (27)	Julian Boyd (13)	Lin Chun-Chi (6)	Intercontinental Basketball Stadium; 3,000	6-3
10	February 12	Taipei Fubon Braves	L 68-83	Julian Boyd (25)	Randall Walko (9)	Kenneth Chien (3)	Intercontinental Basketball Stadium; 3,000	6-4
11	February 13	Kaohsiung Steelers	W 74-68	Brandon Gilbeck (18)	Brandon Gilbeck (20)	Lin Chun-Chi (7)	Intercontinental Basketball Stadium; 3,000	7-4
12	February 18	New Taipei Kings	W 115-99	Julian Boyd (27)	Julian Boyd (18)	Lee Te-Wei (5)	Intercontinental Basketball Stadium; 3,000	8-4
PPD	February 20	@Taoyuan Pilots	Postponed					
PPD	February 26	Hsinchu JKO Lioneers	Postponed					
PPD	February 28	@Taipei Fubon Braves	Postponed					
13	March 5	@Taoyuan Pilots	L 77-81	Randall Walko (15); Julian Boyd (15)	Julian Boyd (17)	Wu Yung-Sheng (4); Randall Walko (4); Douglas Creighton (4)	Taoyuan Arena; 2,058	8-5
14	March 12	@Taipei Fubon Braves	L 101-121	Stephan Hicks (21)	Stephan Hicks (15)	Wu Yung-Sheng (5)	Taipei Heping Basketball Gymnasium; 6,432	8-6
15	March 19	Hsinchu JKO Lioneers	W 97-74	Lin Chun-Chi (20)	Brandon Gilbeck (10)	Kenneth Chien (4)	Intercontinental Basketball Stadium; 3,000	9-6
16	March 20	Kaohsiung Steelers	W 109-88	Randall Walko (23)	Randall Walko (10); Brandon Gilbeck (10)	Lin Chun-Chi (8)	Intercontinental Basketball Stadium; 3,000	10-6
17	March 26	@Kaohsiung Steelers	L 80-95	Randall Walko (19)	Stephan Hicks (16)	Kenneth Chien (3); Randall Walko (3)	Fengshan Arena; 4,812	10-7
18	April 3	Taoyuan Pilots	W 111-77	Randall Walko (35)	Julian Boyd (13)	Lin Chun-Chi (6)	Intercontinental Basketball Stadium; 3,000	11-7
19	April 4	New Taipei Kings	L 91-93	Brandon Gilbeck (24)	Stefan Janković (13)	Kenneth Chien (4)	Intercontinental Basketball Stadium; 3,000	11-8
20	April 9	@Hsinchu JKO Lioneers	L 78-96	Kenneth Chien (14); Stefan Janković (14)	Stefan Janković (10); Julian Boyd (10)	Randall Walko (3); Lee Te-Wei (3); Stefan Janković (3)	Hsinchu County Stadium; 5,865	11-9
21	April 12	@Taoyuan Pilots	W 92-87	Stefan Janković (28)	Julian Boyd (10)	Wu Yung-Sheng (4)	Taoyuan Arena; 2,182	12-9
22	April 16	@New Taipei Kings	W 126-87	Stefan Janković (31)	Stefan Janković (12)	Douglas Creighton (5); Stefan Janković (5)	Xinzhuang Gymnasium; 3,106	13-9
23	April 23	Taipei Fubon Braves	W 124-87	Randall Walko (25)	Randall Walko (11)	Lin Chun-Chi (4)	Intercontinental Basketball Stadium; 3,000	14-9
24	April 24	Taoyuan Pilots	W 104-97	Stefan Janković (25)	Randall Walko (9)	Wu Yung-Sheng (6)	Intercontinental Basketball Stadium; 3,000	15-9
25	April 29	@Hsinchu JKO Lioneers	W 92-85	Stefan Janković (20)	Brandon Gilbeck (10)	Lin Chun-Chi (5)	Hsinchu County Stadium; 5,006	16-9
26	May 1	@Kaohsiung Steelers	L 103-120	Douglas Creighton (25)	Julian Boyd (12)	Lin Chun-Chi (9)	Fengshan Arena; 2,843	16-10
PPD	May 6	@New Taipei Kings	Postponed					
PPD	May 8	@Taoyuan Pilots	Postponed					
27	May 13	Hsinchu JKO Lioneers	L 84-89	Lin Chun-Chi (16)	Brandon Gilbeck (17)	Yang Shen-Yen (5)	Intercontinental Basketball Stadium; 3,000	16-11
28	May 15	@Taipei Fubon Braves	W 104-100	Douglas Creighton (31)	Stefan Janković (16); Brandon Gilbeck (16)	Lin Chun-Chi (7)	Taipei Heping Basketball Gymnasium; 5,018	17-11
PPD	May 17	@Taoyuan Pilots	Postponed					
PPD	May 19	@New Taipei Kings	Postponed					
29	May 27	@Taoyuan Pilots	W 110-76	Julian Boyd (31)	Julian Boyd (13)	Yang Shen-Yen (5)	Nanshan High School Gymnasium; 0	18-11
30	May 28	@New Taipei Kings	W 100-85	Julian Boyd (25)	Julian Boyd (13)	Stefan Janković (5)	Xinzhuang Gymnasium; 1,505	19-11

=== Playoffs ===
2022 playoffs game log Total: 1-3 (home: 0–2; road: 1–1)
Game	Date	Team	Score	High points	High rebounds	High assists	Location Attendance	Record
1	June 4	Taipei Fubon Braves	L 89-98	Lin Chun-Chi (22)	Brandon Gilbeck (14)	Lin Chun-Chi (3); Kenneth Chien (3); Lee Te-Wei (3)	Intercontinental Basketball Stadium; 3,000	0-1
2	June 6	Taipei Fubon Braves	L 94-100	Julian Boyd (31)	Brandon Gilbeck (21)	Lin Chun-Chi (5); Kenneth Chien (5)	Intercontinental Basketball Stadium; 3,000	0-2
3	June 10	@Taipei Fubon Braves	W 95-80	Douglas Creighton (23)	Brandon Gilbeck (13)	Julian Boyd (5)	Taipei Heping Basketball Gymnasium; 6,616	1-2
4	June 12	@Taipei Fubon Braves	L 111-119(2OT)	Brandon Gilbeck (25)	Brandon Gilbeck (15)	Lin Chun-Chi (9)	Taipei Heping Basketball Gymnasium; 5,962	1-3

== Player statistics ==
Legend
GP	Games played	MPG	Minutes per game	2P%	2-point field goal percentage
3P%	3-point field goal percentage	FT%	Free throw percentage	RPG	Rebounds per game
APG	Assists per game	SPG	Steals per game	BPG	Blocks per game
PPG	Points per game		Led the league

=== Regular season ===
Player	GP	MPG	PPG	2P%	3P%	FT%	RPG	APG	SPG	BPG
Chen Jen-Jei	18	14:20	5.83	43.48%	31.03%	73.33%	2.89	0.94	0.83	0.00
Ricky Ledo (Note: Waived during the season)	1	27:47	20.00	26.67%	22.22%	75.00%	10.00	1.00	4.00	1.00
Chieng Li-Huan	27	22:35	6.56	38.54%	32.47%	82.35%	2.63	0.93	0.48	0.15
Wang Chen-Yuan	11	07:01	1.64	20.00%	26.67%	100.00%	0.73	0.73	0.27	0.00
Lin Chun-Chi	25	26:19	10.80	48.72%	34.75%	80.49%	3.48	4.20	1.32	0.00
Wu Yung-Sheng	26	24:38	7.85	34.48%	29.13%	45.16%	3.54	2.96	1.38	0.00
Stephan Hicks (Note: Acquired during the season)	2	33:01	19.00	50.00%	45.45%	50.00%	15.50	1.00	0.50	0.50
Yang Shen-Yen	21	11:10	1.33	31.25%	11.76%	85.71%	1.10	1.10	0.71	0.00
Douglas Creighton	29	27:48	10.21	47.27%	35.55%	86.36%	4.28	2.34	1.17	0.31
Kenneth Chien	29	35:44	11.21	35.35%	38.46%	65.66%	4.83	2.45	1.21	0.21
Randall Walko	26	27:32	11.31	46.67%	37.19%	66.20%	6.69	2.00	0.85	0.50
Lee Te-Wei	25	21:59	6.28	40.19%	20.65%	60.87%	4.84	1.72	0.68	0.96
Wu Sung-Wei	6	06:54	4.50	0.00%	45.00%	0.00%	0.50	0.00	0.17	0.00
Stefan Jankovic	12	27:47	19.92	54.89%	28.85%	71.64%	9.17	2.58	0.75	0.75
Brandon Gilbeck	22	25:39	12.18	55.67%	33.33%	63.64%	10.27	0.64	0.59	3.00
Julian Boyd	20	30:55	18.60	46.41%	24.51%	70.64%	11.35	2.10	1.55	0.95
Cheng Tzu-Yang	5	02:08	1.20	50.00%	0.00%	0.00%	1.00	0.00	0.00	0.00

=== Playoffs ===
Player	GP	MPG	PPG	2P%	3P%	FT%	RPG	APG	SPG	BPG
Chen Jen-Jei	3	07:50	2.33	25.00%	25.00%	100.00%	1.67	0.00	0.00	0.00
Chieng Li-Huan	4	19:43	2.25	14.29%	20.00%	50.00%	2.50	0.75	0.50	0.25
Wang Chen-Yuan	Did not play									
Lin Chun-Chi	4	35:30	17.00	46.67%	28.00%	86.36%	4.25	5.00	0.75	0.00
Wu Yung-Sheng	4	25:39	5.75	33.33%	17.39%	100.00%	2.00	2.25	1.25	0.00
Yang Shen-Yen	4	03:15	0.00	0.00%	0.00%	0.00%	0.00	0.25	0.25	0.00
Douglas Creighton	4	37:02	13.25	0.00%	54.84%	100.00%	4.00	2.00	1.00	0.50
Kenneth Chien	4	43:38	16.25	41.03%	36.36%	69.23%	4.25	4.25	0.50	0.50
Randall Walko	Did not play									
Lee Te-Wei	4	18:29	5.00	44.44%	12.50%	50.00%	4.50	2.00	1.25	0.75
Wu Sung-Wei	Did not play									
Stefan Jankovic	1	08:01	7.00	66.67%	100.00%	0.00%	3.00	0.00	1.00	0.00
Brandon Gilbeck	4	33:25	18.50	62.50%	0.00%	50.00%	15.75	1.50	0.25	3.75
Julian Boyd	3	36:56	21.00	51.35%	42.86%	77.78%	10.00	3.33	0.67	1.00
Cheng Tzu-Yang	1	00:47	0.00	0.00%	0.00%	0.00%	3.00	0.00	0.00	0.00

- Reference：

== Transactions ==
=== Overview ===
Players Added

Draft

- Wang Chen-Yuan

Free agency

- Julian Boyd
- Cheng Tzu-Yang
- Chieng Li-Huan
- Douglas Creighton
- Brandon Gilbeck
- Stephan Hicks
- Stefan Jankovic
- Ricky Ledo
- K. J. McDaniels
- Wu Yung-Sheng
Players Lost

Free agency

- Stephan Hicks
- Derek King
- Tien Lei
- Anthony Tucker
- Wang Po-Chih
- Yang Chin-Min
- Jerran Young

Waived

- Stephan Hicks
- Ricky Ledo
- K. J. McDaniels
- Jonah Morrison

=== Free Agency ===
==== Additions ====
Date	Player	Contract terms	Former team	Ref.
July 9, 2021	Douglas Creighton	2+1-year contract, worth unknown	Yulon Luxgen Dinos	
July 14, 2021	K. J. McDaniels	—	(United States) Greensboro Swarm	
July 29, 2021	Wang Chen-Yuan	—	NCCU Griffins	
August 2, 2021	Wu Yung-Sheng	—	(China) Xinjiang Flying Tigers	
August 17, 2021	Chieng Li-Huan	2+1-year contract, worth unknown	Hsinchu JKO Lioneers	
September 8, 2021	Brandon Gilbeck	—	(Canada) Fraser Valley Bandits	
September 14, 2021	Julian Boyd	—	(Israel) Hapoel Jerusalem B.C.	
November 19, 2021	Cheng Tzu-Yang	—	Yulon Luxgen Dinos	
November 22, 2021	Ricky Ledo	—	(Turkey) Lokman Hekim Fethiye Belediyespor	
February 15, 2022	Stephan Hicks	—	(United States) Fort Wayne Mad Ants	
March 2, 2022	Stefan Jankovic	—	(Belarus) BC Tsmoki-Minsk	

==== Subtractions ====
Date	Player	Reason	New Team	Ref.
April 4, 2021	Tien Lei	retirement	—	
May 15, 2021	Derek King	contract expired	Taichung Suns	
June 7, 2021	Jonah Morrison	contract terminated	New Taipei CTBC DEA	
June 21, 2021	Wang Po-Chih	contract expired	Kaohsiung Steelers	
June 25, 2021	Anthony Tucker	contract expired	Kaohsiung Steelers	
July 11, 2021	Jerran Young	contract expired	New Taipei Kings	
August 3, 2021	Stephan Hicks	contract expired	(Russia) BC Samara	
August 10, 2021	Yang Chin-Min	contract expired	New Taipei Kings	
September 22, 2021	K. J. McDaniels	contract terminated (Note: His wife is serving in the United States Navy and the club was unable to negotiate paternity leave.)	(Philippines) NLEX Road Warriors	
December 23, 2021	Ricky Ledo	released	(China) Guangdong Southern Tigers	
March 28, 2022	Stephan Hicks	released	TaiwanBeer HeroBears	

== Awards ==
=== End-of-Season Awards ===
Recipient	Award	Ref.
Formosa Sexy	PLG Cheerleader Squad of the Year	
Brandon Gilbeck	Blocks Leader	
Kenneth Chien	PLG All-Defensive Team	
Kenneth Chien	Most Improved Player	
Kenneth Chien	All-PLG 2nd Team	

=== Players of the Month ===
Recipient	Award	Month awarded	Ref.
Julian Boyd	February Most Valuable Player	February	

=== Players of the Week ===
Week	Recipient	Date awarded	Ref.
Week 7	Lin Chun-Chi	January 14 - January 16	
Week 14	Lin Chun-Chi	March 18 - March 20	
Week 19	Douglas Creighton	April 23 - April 24	
