= 2020–21 Taipei Fubon Braves season =

Taiwanese professional basketball season

Taipei Fubon Braves
2020-21 season
- President: Tsai Cherng-Ru
- General Manager: Tsai Cherng-Ru
- Head Coach: Hsu Chin-Che
- Arena: Taipei Heping Basketball Gymnasium
- P. League+: 19-5(.792)
- Playoffs: P. League+ champions (Defeated Dreamers 3-1)
- Scoring leader: Mike Singletary(20.38)
- Rebounding leader: Ihor Zaytsev(13.00)
- Assists leader: Mike Singletary(4.06)
- Highest home attendance: 7,001 (March 28, 2021)
- Lowest home attendance: 5,993 (March 14, 2021)
- Average home attendance: 6,750(regular season)
- Biggest win: Braves 124-94 Pilots (March 14, 2021)
- Biggest defeat: Braves 82-97 Pilots (February 7, 2021)
- All statistics correct as of June 19, 2021.

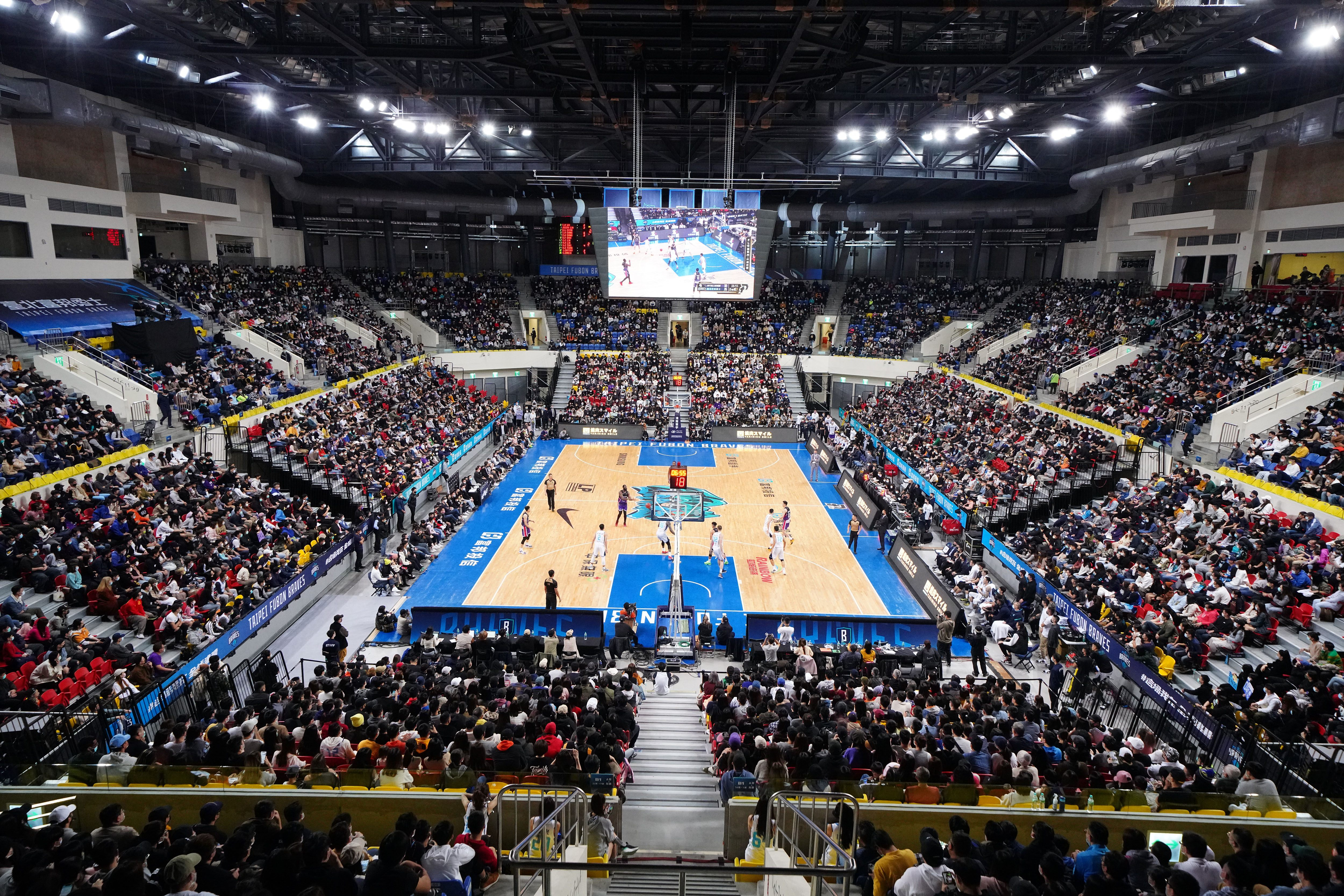
A home game against the Hsinchu JKO Lioneers in the 2020-21 PLG season

The 2020–21 Taipei Fubon Braves season was the franchise's 23rd league season, the first season of the franchise in the P. LEAGUE+ (PLG), its 2nd in the Taipei City and playing home games at Taipei Heping Basketball Gymnasium. They are coached by Hsu Chin-Che in his fourth year as head coach.

== Preseason ==
On September 9, 2020, former Taiwanese professional basketball player Blackie Chen announced the establishment of P. LEAGUE+ (PLG). The first game of PLG was started on December 19, 2020.

== Draft ==
The P. LEAGUE+ (PLG) did not hold a draft in its first season.

== Standings ==
Team	GP	W	L	PCT
z – Taipei Fubon Braves	24	19	5	.792
x – Taoyuan Pilots	24	10	14	.417
x – Formosa Taishin Dreamers	24	10	14	.417
Hsinchu JKO Lioneers	24	9	15	.375

== Roster ==
Note: Flags indicate national team eligibility at FIBA-sanctioned events. Players may hold other non-FIBA nationalities not displayed.

2020–21 Taipei Fubon Braves roster
Players
Coaches

Pos.	No.	Nat.	Name	Ht.	Wt.	Age	From
G	0	(Chinese Taipei)	Lai Ting-En	1.76 m (5 ft 9 in)	70 kg (154 lb)	28 – 22 July 1996	Fu Jen
G	1	(United States) (Chinese Taipei)	Joseph Lin	1.82 m (6 ft 0 in)	69 kg (152 lb)	32 – 21 June 1992	Hamilton
G	2	(Chinese Taipei)	Chien Wei-Ju	1.85 m (6 ft 1 in)	80 kg (176 lb)	33 – 20 January 1992	NTNU
G	3	(Chinese Taipei)	Chang Tsung-Hsien	1.92 m (6 ft 4 in)	86 kg (190 lb)	36 – 27 December 1988	BYU–Hawaii
G	6	(Chinese Taipei) (Australia)	Oscar Lin (injured)	1.83 m (6 ft 0 in)	90 kg (198 lb)	29 – 21 August 1995	Chien Hsin Tech
F	7	(Chinese Taipei)	Chang Po-Wei	1.90 m (6 ft 3 in)	88 kg (194 lb)	34 – 22 July 1990	NTUA
F	8	(Chinese Taipei)	Chou Kuei-Yu	1.93 m (6 ft 4 in)	95 kg (209 lb)	26 – 19 July 1998	NTNU
F	9	(Chinese Taipei)	Kuo Shao-Chieh	1.90 m (6 ft 3 in)	80 kg (176 lb)	34 – 9 April 1990	TNU
F	12	(Chinese Taipei)	Lin Chih-Chieh	1.92 m (6 ft 4 in)	92 kg (203 lb)	42 – 11 June 1982	Chinese Culture
F	13	(Chinese Taipei)	Lin Meng-Hsueh	1.95 m (6 ft 5 in)	88 kg (194 lb)	32 – 14 October 1992	NTSU
F	14	(Chinese Taipei)	Tsai Wen-Cheng (C)	1.90 m (6 ft 3 in)	96 kg (212 lb)	39 – 31 May 1985	NCUE
F	17	(United States)	Mike Singletary (I)	1.98 m (6 ft 6 in)	103 kg (227 lb)	36 – 19 September 1988	Texas Tech
C	21	(Chinese Taipei)	Tseng Hsiang-Chun	2.05 m (6 ft 9 in)	95 kg (209 lb)	26 – 8 August 1998	Fu Jen
C	23	(Saint Vincent and the Grenadines)	Brendon Smart	1.98 m (6 ft 6 in)	95 kg (209 lb)	29 – 5 October 1995	Chien Hsin Tech
C	32	(Ukraine)	Ihor Zaytsev (I)	2.11 m (6 ft 11 in)	110 kg (243 lb)	35 – 11 May 1989	Ukraine
F	36	(Belize) (United States)	Charles García (I)	2.04 m (6 ft 8 in)	108 kg (238 lb)	36 – 13 October 1988	Seattle
C	76	(Chinese Taipei)	Tseng Wen-Ting	2.04 m (6 ft 8 in)	97 kg (214 lb)	40 – 6 July 1984	TPEC

Head coach

- (Chinese Taipei) Hsu Chin-Che

Assistant coach(es)

- (Chinese Taipei) Wu Yung-Jen
- (Chinese Taipei) Lin Wei-Hao
- (Chinese Taipei) Chiang Chih-Chen
- (Chinese Taipei) Wei Wei

Strength & conditioning coach(es)

- (Chinese Taipei) Jheng Wei-Syuan

Athletic trainer(s)

- (Chinese Taipei) Lin Wu-Chang

Legend

- (C) Team captain
- (I) Import player
- Injured

== Game log ==
=== Preseason ===
2020 preseason game log Total: 5-1 (Home: 3–0; Road: 2–1)
Game	Date	Team	Score	High points	High rebounds	High assists	Location Attendance	Record
1	October 17	@Taoyuan AirApe	W 75-67	Chien Wei-Ju (13)	Tseng Hsiang-Chun (18)	Lai Ting-En (3)	Hsinchu County Stadium; 8,068	1-0
2	October 18	Hsinchu Lioneers	W 93-81	Chien Wei-Ju (22)	Tseng Hsiang-Chun (15)	Joseph Lin (6)	Hsinchu County Stadium; 7,888	2-0
3	November 7	Taoyuan Pilots	W 109-71	Ihor Zaytsev (18); Mike Singletary (18)	Tseng Hsiang-Chun (11)	Lai Ting-En (6)	Taipei Heping Basketball Gymnasium; 6,459	3-0
4	November 8	@Formosa Dreamers	L 87-95	Mike Singletary (20)	Tseng Wen-Ting (12)	Joseph Lin (5)	Taipei Heping Basketball Gymnasium; 6,606	3-1
5	November 21	Hsinchu Lioneers	W 107-71	Ihor Zaytsev (18)	Ihor Zaytsev (14)	Lin Chih-Chieh (6)	National Taiwan University of Sport Gymnasium; 4,500	4-1
6	November 22	@Formosa Taishin Dreamers	W 118-83	Ihor Zaytsev (28)	Ihor Zaytsev (11)	Chien Wei-Ju (4); Tseng Wen-Ting (4)	National Taiwan University of Sport Gymnasium; 4,700	5-1

=== Regular season ===
2020–21 regular season game log Total: 19-5 (Home: 11-1, Road: 8-4)
Game	Date	Team	Score	High points	High rebounds	High assists	Location attendance	Record
1	December 19	@Formosa Taishin Dreamers	W 89-86	Jet Chang (34)	Mike Singletary (14)	Mike Singletary (4); Chien Wei-Ju (4)	Changhua County Stadium; 5,881	1-0
2	December 27	@Hsinchu JKO Lioneers	W 96-87	Charles García (28)	Charles García (16)	Joseph Lin (4)	Hsinchu County Stadium; 7,236	2-0
3	January 2	Taoyuan Pilots	W 93-83	Jet Chang (20)	Ihor Zaytsev (16)	Mike Singletary (7)	Taipei Heping Basketball Gymnasium; 7,000	3-0
4	January 3	Hsinchu JKO Lioneers	W 96-86	Charles García (25)	Ihor Zaytsev (14)	Lin Chih-Chieh (8)	Taipei Heping Basketball Gymnasium; 7,000	4-0
5	January 10	@Hsinchu JKO Lioneers	W 105-98	Charles García (23)	Charles García (14)	Tsai Wen-Cheng (5)	Hsinchu County Stadium; 6,377	5-0
6	January 16	Formosa Taishin Dreamers	W 115-95	Jet Chang (22)	Mike Singletary (11)	Ihor Zaytsev (5)	Taipei Heping Basketball Gymnasium; 7,000	6-0
7	January 17	Hsinchu JKO Lioneers	L 102-111	Jet Chang (29)	Charles García (13)	Lin Chih-Chieh (9)	Taipei Heping Basketball Gymnasium; 6,968	6-1
8	January 23	@Hsinchu JKO Lioneers	W 87-67	Chien Wei-Ju (19)	Charles García (16)	Jet Chang (6)	Hsinchu County Stadium; 8,168	7-1
9	January 24	@Taoyuan Pilots	W 102-79	Ihor Zaytsev (28)	Ihor Zaytsev (20)	Chien Wei-Ju (6)	Taoyuan Arena; 0	8-1
10	January 30	@Taoyuan Pilots	W 110-97	Joseph Lin (27)	Charles García (16)	Lin Chih-Chieh (7)	Taoyuan Arena; 0	9-1
11	January 31	@Formosa Taishin Dreamers	W 111-84	Mike Singletary (27)	Ihor Zaytsev (18)	Mike Singletary (6)	Changhua County Stadium; 4,867	10-1
12	February 6	@Formosa Taishin Dreamers	L 91-100	Charles García (28)	Charles García (11)	Ihor Zaytsev (4); Lin Chih-Chieh (4)	Changhua County Stadium; 4,280	10-2
13	February 7	@Taoyuan Pilots	L 82-97	Mike Singletary (28)	Mike Singletary (14)	Joseph Lin (8)	Taoyuan Arena; 0	10-3
14	February 21	Hsinchu JKO Lioneers	W 106-97	Jet Chang (24)	Ihor Zaytsev (16)	Mike Singletary (6); Jet Chang (6)	Taipei Heping Basketball Gymnasium; 7,000	11-3
15	February 27	@Formosa Taishin Dreamers	L 89-101	Lin Chih-Chieh (27)	Charles García (12)	Mike Singletary (4)	Changhua County Stadium; 4,273	11-4
16	March 1	@Hsinchu JKO Lioneers	L 76-83	Jet Chang (16)	Ihor Zaytsev (14)	Lai Ting-En (5)	Hsinchu County Stadium; 6,331	11-5
17	March 6	Formosa Taishin Dreamers	W 114-104	Mike Singletary (30)	Mike Singletary (10); Ihor Zaytsev (10)	Ihor Zaytsev (5); Lin Chih-Chieh (5)	Taipei Heping Basketball Gymnasium; 6,888	12-5
18	March 7	Hsinchu JKO Lioneers	W 109-105	Mike Singletary (34)	Mike Singletary (14)	Tsai Wen-Cheng (4); Chien Wei-Ju (4)	Taipei Heping Basketball Gymnasium; 7,000	13-5
19	March 13	Formosa Taishin Dreamers	W 99-94	Mike Singletary (27)	Mike Singletary (16)	Chien Wei-Ju (5)	Taipei Heping Basketball Gymnasium; 6,430	14-5
20	March 14	Taoyuan Pilots	W 124-94	Ihor Zaytsev (25)	Ihor Zaytsev (9)	Chou Kuei-Yu (11)	Taipei Heping Basketball Gymnasium; 5,993	15-5
21	March 27	Taoyuan Pilots	W 109-93	Charles García (31)	Charles García (16)	Joseph Lin (6)	Taipei Heping Basketball Gymnasium; 6,238	16-5
22	March 28	Formosa Taishin Dreamers	W 110-106	Ihor Zaytsev (22)	Ihor Zaytsev (24)	Ihor Zaytsev (6)	Taipei Heping Basketball Gymnasium; 7,001	17-5
23	April 5	@Taoyuan Pilots	W 110-100	Mike Singletary (28)	Mike Singletary (9)	Mike Singletary (9)	Taoyuan Arena; 4,537	18-5
24	April 10	Taoyuan Pilots	W 117-101	Joseph Lin (19); Jet Chang (19)	Charles García (10)	Tseng Wen-Ting (7)	Taipei Heping Basketball Gymnasium; 6,482	19-5

==== Regular season note ====
- Due to the COVID-19 pandemic, the Taoyuan City Government and Taoyuan Pilots declared that the games in Taoyuan Arena would be played behind closed doors from January 16, 2021 to February 7, 2021.

=== Finals ===
2020–21 finals game log Total: 3-1 (home: 1-1; road: 2-0)
Game	Date	Team	Score	High points	High rebounds	High assists	Location Attendance	Series
1	May 7	Formosa Taishin Dreamers	L 109-114	Mike Singletary (23); Ihor Zaytsev (23)	Ihor Zaytsev (15)	Mike Singletary (8); Lin Chih-Chieh (8)	Taipei Heping Basketball Gymnasium; 7,000	0-1
2	May 9	Formosa Taishin Dreamers	W 106-82	Mike Singletary (29)	Mike Singletary (12)	Mike Singletary (8)	Taipei Heping Basketball Gymnasium; 7,000	1-1
3	May 13	@Formosa Taishin Dreamers	W 114-110 (OT)	Jet Chang (25)	Mike Singletary (16)	Mike Singletary (12)	Changhua County Stadium; No In-Person Attendance	2-1
4	May 15	@Formosa Taishin Dreamers	W 115-90	Ihor Zaytsev (25)	Ihor Zaytsev (17)	Mike Singletary (9); Joseph Lin (9)	Changhua County Stadium; No In-Person Attendance	3-1

==== Finals note ====
- Due to the COVID-19 pandemic, the league officials declared that Game 3 and Game 4 would be played behind closed doors and Game 5 to Game 7 would be cancelled.

== Player statistics ==
Legend
GP	Games played	MPG	Minutes per game	2P%	2-point field goal percentage
3P%	3-point field goal percentage	FT%	Free throw percentage	RPG	Rebounds per game
APG	Assists per game	SPG	Steals per game	BPG	Blocks per game
PPG	Points per game		Led the league

=== Regular season ===
Player	GP	MPG	PPG	2P%	3P%	FT%	RPG	APG	SPG	BPG
Lai Ting-En	23	12:12	3.78	50.00%	36.11%	100.00%	1.39	1.57	1.22	0.00
Joseph Lin	17	23:15	9.35	46.88%	34.88%	50.00%	3.35	3.59	1.47	0.18
Chien Wei-Ju	23	21:31	8.52	38.10%	35.04%	75.76%	2.83	2.17	0.61	0.04
Jet Chang	22	30:06	15.64	44.78%	34.34%	56.25%	2.50	2.86	1.77	0.09
Oscar Lin	Did not play									
Chang Po-Wei	10	11:20	4.40	52.00%	19.23%	60.00%	1.00	0.10	0.30	0.30
Chou Kuei-Yu	18	07:32	1.39	28.57%	23.08%	100.00%	0.78	1.28	0.06	0.11
Kuo Shao-Chieh	7	07:34	2.29	71.43%	9.09%	50.00%	0.86	0.29	0.14	0.00
Lin Chih-Chieh	16	25:57	11.69	56.45%	27.84%	81.82%	5.75	3.88	0.94	0.13
Lin Meng-Hsueh	20	14:09	3.45	50.91%	9.09%	50.00%	2.20	0.60	0.40	0.25
Tsai Wen-Cheng	22	17:53	6.82	44.34%	50.00%	68.00%	4.23	1.86	1.00	0.18
Mike Singletary	16	33:41	20.38	49.66%	36.08%	82.95%	9.88	4.06	1.31	0.25
Tseng Hsiang-Chun	24	20:41	6.29	52.85%	0.00%	51.22%	6.29	0.88	0.50	0.96
Brendon Smart	14	11:12	3.36	41.94%	21.74%	60.00%	4.14	0.36	0.36	0.36
Ihor Zaytsev	18	36:02	17.17	56.50%	30.36%	65.17%	13.00	2.44	0.94	0.83
Charles García	14	33:10	20.00	59.09%	35.71%	74.11%	12.57	1.64	1.07	0.86
Tseng Wen-Ting	15	15:04	3.47	59.26%	22.22%	33.33%	2.80	2.33	0.80	0.67

=== Playoffs ===
Player	GP	MPG	PPG	2P%	3P%	FT%	RPG	APG	SPG	BPG
Lai Ting-En	3	08:47	3.00	42.86%	16.67%	0.00%	1.33	0.67	1.00	0.00
Joseph Lin	4	17:24	4.75	50.00%	16.67%	66.67%	2.50	4.25	0.25	0.25
Chien Wei-Ju	4	15:38	4.75	33.33%	23.81%	0.00%	2.25	1.50	1.25	0.00
Jet Chang	4	33:23	19.00	50.00%	29.63%	66.67%	3.00	3.75	2.00	0.25
Oscar Lin	Did not play									
Chang Po-Wei	Did not play									
Chou Kuei-Yu	2	09:10	1.00	0.00%	0.00%	100.00%	1.00	1.00	0.00	0.00
Kuo Shao-Chieh	Did not play									
Lin Chih-Chieh	4	23:43	8.25	46.15%	21.43%	75.00%	4.25	4.25	0.25	0.00
Lin Meng-Hsueh	4	21:56	6.00	47.06%	33.33%	100.00%	4.25	1.00	0.75	0.50
Tsai Wen-Cheng	4	14:22	8.00	52.38%	22.22%	100.00%	3.75	0.75	1.00	0.00
Mike Singletary	4	37:44	23.25	59.46%	34.21%	76.92%	12.25	9.25	1.25	0.00
Tseng Hsiang-Chun	3	18:27	4.67	33.33%	0.00%	100.00%	4.67	0.33	0.67	0.00
Brendon Smart	2	14:02	6.00	37.50%	66.67%	0.00%	4.50	0.50	0.50	0.50
Ihor Zaytsev	4	35:09	24.00	67.35%	71.43%	83.33%	13.75	2.50	0.75	0.50
Charles García	Did not play									
Tseng Wen-Ting	4	14:51	3.75	54.55%	16.67%	0.00%	3.25	1.75	0.25	0.00

- Reference：

== Transactions ==
=== Free Agency ===
==== Re-signed ====
Date	Player	Contract terms	Ref.
June 17, 2020	Tsai Wen-Cheng	2+1-year contract, worth unknown	
July 29, 2020	Lin Meng-Hsueh	—	
September 11, 2020	Joseph Lin	—	

==== Additions ====
Date	Player	Contract terms	Former teams	Ref.
May 26, 2020	Chou Kuei-Yu	—	NTNU Master	
May 26, 2020	Tseng Hsiang-Chun	—	FJU	
July 3, 2020	Chien Wei-Ju	—	Taoyuan Pauian Archiland	
September 28, 2020	Brendon Smart	—	UCH	
October 27, 2020	Chang Tsung-Hsien	—	Formosa Dreamers	
November 3, 2020	Mike Singletary	—	(Thailand) Mono Vampire	
November 3, 2020	Ihor Zaytsev	—	Taiwan Beer	
November 3, 2020	Charles García	—	Taoyuan Pauian Archiland	

==== Subtractions ====
Date	Player	Reason	New team	Ref.
—	O. J. Mayo	—	(China) Liaoning Flying Leopards	
—	Samuel Deguara	—	(Japan) Tokyo Excellence	
May 26, 2020	Hung Chih-Shan	contract expired	New Taipei Kings	
May 26, 2020	Hsiao Shun-Yi	contract expired	Hsinchu JKO Lioneers	
May 26, 2020	Yang Hsing-Chih	contract expired	New Taipei Kings	
May 26, 2020	Li Ping-Hung	contract expired	Kaohsiung Jeoutai Technology	
May 26, 2020	Liu Weir-Chern	contract expired	Bank of Taiwan	
May 26, 2020	Wu Hung-Hsing	contract expired	Kaohsiung Jeoutai Technology	
May 26, 2020	Tsai Yang-Ming	contract expired	Taoyuan Pauian Archiland	
May 26, 2020	Lin Chih-Wei	contract expired	Bank of Taiwan	

== Awards ==
=== Finals awards ===
Recipient	Award	Ref.
Taipei Fubon Braves	2021 P. League+ Champions	
Mike Singletary	Finals Most Valuable Player	

=== End-of-season awards ===
Recipient	Award	Ref.
Jet Chang	Most Valuable Player	
Jet Chang	All-PLG Team	
Jet Chang	All-Defensive Team	
Ihor Zaytsev	Import of the Year	
Ihor Zaytsev	All-PLG Team	
Hsu Chin-Che	Coach of the Year	
Tsai Cherng-Ju	GM of the Year	
Lin Chih-Chieh	Mr. Popular	

=== Players of the Month ===
Recipient	Award	Month awarded	Ref.
Jet Chang	December Most Valuable Player	December	

=== Players of the Week ===
Week	Recipient	Date awarded	Ref.
Preseason	Jet Chang; Lin Chih-Chieh	October 7 - November 22	
Week 1	Jet Chang	December 19 - December 20	
Week 2	Jet Chang; Charles García	December 26 - December 27	
Week 3	Lin Chih-Chieh	January 2 - January 3	
Week 4	Lin Chih-Chieh	January 9 - January 10	
Week 5	Jet Chang	January 16 - January 17	
Week 6	Tseng Hsiang-Chun	January 23 - January 24	
Week 7	Joseph Lin	January 30 - January 31	
Week 8	Jet Chang	February 6 - February 7	
Week 9	Jet Chang	February 20 - February 21	
Week 10	Lin Chih-Chieh	February 27 - March 1	
Week 11	Lin Chih-Chieh; Mike Singletary	March 6 - March 7	
Week 12	Tsai Wen-Cheng	March 13 - March 14	
Week 14	Joseph Lin	March 27 - March 28	
Week 15	Joseph Lin	April 3 - April 5	
