= 2020–21 Formosa Taishin Dreamers season =

Taiwanese professional basketball season

Formosa Taishin Dreamers
2020-21 season
- President: Chang Cheng-Chung
- General Manager: Han Chun-Kai
- Head Coach: Kyle Julius
- Arena: Changhua County Stadium; NTUS Gymnasium
- P. League+: 10-14(.417)
- Playoffs: P. League+ finals (lost to Braves 1-3)
- Scoring leader: Anthony Tucker(27.88)
- Rebounding leader: Stephan Hicks(12.30)
- Assists leader: Anthony Tucker(5.65)
- Highest home attendance: 6,000 (April 4, 2021)
- Lowest home attendance: 3,612 (April 28, 2021)
- Average home attendance: 4,529(regular season)
- Biggest win: Dreamers 102-63 Pilots (April 23, 2021)
- Biggest defeat: Dreamers 84-111 Braves (January 31, 2021)
- All statistics correct as of November 8, 2021.

The 2020–21 Formosa Taishin Dreamers season was the franchise's 4th season, its first season in the P. LEAGUE+ (PLG). The Dreamers are coached by Kyle Julius in his second year as head coach. The Dreamers play their home games at Changhua County Stadium and National Taiwan University of Sport Gymnasium.

On July 8, 2020, Blackie Chen stepped down as the team manager and announced the establishment of PLG. The Dreamers has become one of the four teams of the inaugural PLG season.

The Dreamers was sponsored by Taishin International Bank this season, renamed Formosa Taishin Dreamers.

On March 15, 2021, Tien Lei announced that this would be his final season.

== Draft ==
The P. LEAGUE+ (PLG) did not hold a draft in its first season.

== Standings ==
Team	GP	W	L	PCT
z – Taipei Fubon Braves	24	19	5	.792
x – Taoyuan Pilots	24	10	14	.417
x – Formosa Taishin Dreamers	24	10	14	.417
Hsinchu JKO Lioneers	24	9	15	.375

== Roster ==
Note: Flags indicate national team eligibility at FIBA-sanctioned events. Players may hold other non-FIBA nationalities not displayed.

2020–21 Formosa Taishin Dreamers roster
Players
Coaches

Pos.	No.	Nat.	Name	Ht.	Wt.	Age	From
G	0	(Chinese Taipei)	Chen Jen-Jei	1.83 m (6 ft 0 in)	83 kg (183 lb)	27 – 16 September 1997	Grand View
F/C	1	(Chinese Taipei)	Tien Lei	2.03 m (6 ft 8 in)	103 kg (227 lb)	41 – 1 June 1983	NTNU
G	2	(United States)	Anthony Tucker (I)	1.93 m (6 ft 4 in)	93 kg (205 lb)	35 – 2 September 1989	Minnesota
G/F	6	(Chinese Taipei)	Yang Chin-Min	1.90 m (6 ft 3 in)	98 kg (216 lb)	41 – 22 January 1984	Fu Jen
C	10	(Chinese Taipei)	Wang Po-Chih	1.95 m (6 ft 5 in)	130 kg (287 lb)	28 – 29 October 1996	NTSU
G	11	(Chinese Taipei)	Lin Chun-Chi	1.73 m (5 ft 8 in)	70 kg (154 lb)	27 – 29 January 1998	Chien Hsin Tech
F	12	(United States)	Jerran Young (I)	1.98 m (6 ft 6 in)	99 kg (218 lb)	33 – 25 December 1991	Wright State
F/C	13	(Chinese Taipei) (United Kingdom)	Jonah Morrison	2.05 m (6 ft 9 in)	105 kg (231 lb)	24 – 2 June 2000	UBC
F/C	17	(United States)	Stephan Hicks (I)	1.98 m (6 ft 6 in)	100 kg (220 lb)	32 – 2 April 1992	Cal State Northridge
G	18	(Chinese Taipei)	Yang Shen-Yen	1.78 m (5 ft 10 in)	80 kg (176 lb)	28 – 18 January 1997	NTSU
F	20	(United States) (Chinese Taipei)	Derek King	1.90 m (6 ft 3 in)	90 kg (198 lb)	33 – 13 September 1991	California
G/F	23	(United States) (Chinese Taipei)	Kenneth Chien	1.85 m (6 ft 1 in)	86 kg (190 lb)	30 – 6 February 1995	Broward
F	24	(United States) (Chinese Taipei)	Randall Walko	1.96 m (6 ft 5 in)	93 kg (205 lb)	26 – 21 September 1998	TCNJ
C	26	(Chinese Taipei)	Lee Te-Wei	2.00 m (6 ft 7 in)	115 kg (254 lb)	33 – 15 October 1991	NRVS
G	30	(Chinese Taipei)	Wu Sung-Wei	1.82 m (6 ft 0 in)	80 kg (176 lb)	31 – 21 May 1993	I-Shou

Head coach

- (Canada) Kyle Julius

Assistant coach(es)

- (Chinese Taipei) Liu Wen-He
- (Chinese Taipei) Lai Po-Lin

Athletic trainer(s)

- (Chinese Taipei) Wang Yu-Chih
- (Chinese Taipei) Hou Yao-Hsin

Team manager

- (Chinese Taipei) Lin Wu Cheng-Lin

Legend

- (C) Team captain
- (I) Import player
- Injured

== Game log ==
=== Preseason ===
2020 preseason game log
Total: 4–2 (home: 3–1; road: 1–1)
Preseason : 4–2 (Home: 3–1; Road: 1–1)

Game	Date	Team	Score	High points	High rebounds	High assists	Location Attendance	Record
1	October 17	@Lioneers	L 80–87	Yang Chin-Min (23)	Yang Chin-Min (11)	Yang Chin-Min (5)	Hsinchu County Stadium; 8,068	0–1
2	October 18	AirApe	W 84–77	Lin Chun-Chi (18)	Wang Po-Chih (10)	Lin Chun-Chi (6)	Hsinchu County Stadium; 7,888	1–1
3	November 7	Lioneers	W 122–104	Jerran Young (38)	Jerran Young (14)	Anthony Tucker (5)	Taipei Heping Basketball Gymnasium; 6,459	2–1
4	November 8	Braves	W 95–87	Tucker, Yang C. (24)	Lee, Tien, Yang C. (7)	Anthony Tucker (6)	Taipei Heping Basketball Gymnasium; 6,606	3–1
5	November 21	@Pilots	W 93–86	Anthony Tucker (20)	Lee Te-Wei (9)	Anthony Tucker (8)	National Taiwan University of Sport Gymnasium; 4,500	4–1
6	November 22	Braves	L 83–118	Jerran Young (26)	Jerran Young (11)	Anthony Tucker (7)	National Taiwan University of Sport Gymnasium; 4,700	4–2

2020–21 schedule

=== Regular season ===
2020–21 game log
Total: 10–14 (home: 6–6; road: 4–8)
December : 0–2 (Home: 0–2; Road: 0–0)

Game	Date	Team	Score	High points	High rebounds	High assists	Location Attendance	Record
1	December 19	Braves	L 86–89	Yang Chin-Min (30)	Jerran Young (9)	Tucker, Yang S. (4)	Changhua County Stadium; 5,881	0–1
2	December 20	Pilots	L 83–103	Jerran Young (21)	Jerran Young (10)	Anthony Tucker (6)	Changhua County Stadium; 3,689	0–2

January : 3–5 (Home: 1–1; Road: 2–4)

Game	Date	Team	Score	High points	High rebounds	High assists	Location Attendance	Record
3	January 3	@Pilots	L 100–104	Anthony Tucker (42)	Jerran Young (12)	Yang Chin-Min (6)	Taoyuan Arena; 3,862	0–3
4	January 9	@Lioneers	W 95–87	Anthony Tucker (41)	Lee Te-Wei (12)	Anthony Tucker (5)	Hsinchu County Stadium; 5,798	1–3
5	January 16	@Braves	L 95–115	Stephan Hicks (27)	Stephan Hicks (18)	Stephan Hicks (6)	Taipei Heping Basketball Gymnasium; 7,000	1–4
6	January 17	@Pilots	L 86–90	Anthony Tucker (22)	Lee Te-Wei (12)	Anthony Tucker (8)	Taoyuan Arena; 0	1–5
7	January 23	@Pilots	L 84–89	Jerran Young (20)	Randall Walko (12)	Yang S., Young (4)	Taoyuan Arena; 0	1–6
8	January 24	@Lioneers	W 92–81	Anthony Tucker (29)	Lee Te-Wei (15)	Tucker, Young (3)	Hsinchu County Stadium; 5,967	2–6
9	January 30	Lioneers	W 103–92	Anthony Tucker (39)	Jerran Young (9)	Jerran Young (5)	Changhua County Stadium; 4,521	3–6
10	January 31	Braves	L 84–111	Stephan Hicks (25)	Stephan Hicks (16)	Chen Jen-Jei (4)	Changhua County Stadium; 4,867	3–7

February : 5–0 (Home: 4–0; Road: 1–0)

Game	Date	Team	Score	High points	High rebounds	High assists	Location Attendance	Record
11	February 6	Braves	W 100–91	Hicks, Young (27)	Stephan Hicks (10)	Yang Chin-Min (11)	Changhua County Stadium; 4,280	4–7
12	February 7	Lioneers	W 96–85	Anthony Tucker (26)	Tucker, Young (13)	Kenneth Chien (5)	Changhua County Stadium; 3,886	5–7
13	February 21	@Pilots	W 102–99	Anthony Tucker (42)	Lee Te-Wei (11)	Anthony Tucker (7)	Taoyuan Arena; 1,500	6–7
14	February 27	Braves	W 101–89	Stephan Hicks (27)	Lee Te-Wei (15)	Jerran Young (5)	Changhua County Stadium; 4,273	7–7
15	February 28	Pilots	W 98–90	Lin Chun-Chi (39)	Jerran Young (12)	Chien, Tucker (6)	Changhua County Stadium; 3,876	8–7

March : 2–5 (Home: 1–1; Road: 1–4)

Game	Date	Team	Score	High points	High rebounds	High assists	Location Attendance	Record
16	March 6	@Braves	L 104–114	Jerran Young (38)	Stephan Hicks (16)	Jerran Young (5)	Taipei Heping Basketball Gymnasium; 6,888	8–8
17	March 13	@Braves	L 94–99	Randall Walko (33)	Kenneth Chien (10)	Tucker, Young (5)	Taipei Heping Basketball Gymnasium; 6,430	8–9
18	March 14	@Lioneers	L 105–112	Anthony Tucker (41)	Lee Te-Wei (10)	Anthony Tucker (10)	Hsinchu County Stadium; 5,893	8–10
19	March 20	Lioneers	L 87–99	Anthony Tucker (24)	Stephan Hicks (13)	Anthony Tucker (5)	National Taiwan University of Sport Gymnasium; 4,000	8–11
20	March 21	Pilots	W 107–100	Randall Walko (34)	Jerran Young (14)	Lin Chun-Chi (7)	National Taiwan University of Sport Gymnasium; 3,976	9–11
21	March 27	@Lioneers	W 99–91	Lin Chun-Chi (32)	Stephan Hicks (14)	Yang Chin-Min (6)	Hsinchu County Stadium; 7,078	10–11
22	March 28	@Braves	L 106–110	Anthony Tucker (36)	Tucker, Young (11)	Anthony Tucker (10)	Taipei Heping Basketball Gymnasium; 7,001	10–12

April : 0–2 (Home: 0–2; Road: 0–0)

Game	Date	Team	Score	High points	High rebounds	High assists	Location Attendance	Record
23	April 3	Pilots	L 95–106	Stephan Hicks (33)	Hicks, Morrison (10)	Yang Shen-Yen (7)	Changhua County Stadium; 5,100	10–13
24	April 4	Lioneers	L 100–108	Anthony Tucker (41)	Anthony Tucker (10)	Anthony Tucker (12)	Changhua County Stadium; 6,000	10–14

2020–21 schedule

==== Regular season note ====
- Due to the COVID-19 pandemic, the Taoyuan City Government and Taoyuan Pilots declared that the games in Taoyuan Arena would be played behind closed doors from January 16, 2021 to February 7, 2021.

=== Playoffs ===
2021 playoffs game log
Total: 4–5 (home: 1–3; road: 3–2)
Playoffs : 3–2 (Home: 1–1; Road: 2–1)

Game	Date	Team	Score	High points	High rebounds	High assists	Location Attendance	Series
1	April 23	@Pilots	W 102–63	Stephan Hicks (27)	Stephan Hicks (19)	Lee Te-Wei (5)	Taoyuan Arena; 2,977	1–0
2	April 25	@Pilots	L 86–91	Stephan Hicks (21)	Stephan Hicks (18)	Anthony Tucker (6)	Taoyuan Arena; 4,758	1–1
3	April 28	Pilots	L 79–82	Stephan Hicks (21)	Stephan Hicks (19)	Yang C., Young (5)	Changhua County Stadium; 3,612	1–2
4	April 30	Pilots	W 103–74	Stephan Hicks (39)	Stephan Hicks (17)	Lin, Young (8)	Changhua County Stadium; 4,015	2–2
5	May 2	@Pilots	W 93–91	Jerran Young (42)	Jerran Young (11)	Hicks, Lee, Lin (5)	Changhua County Stadium; 3,003	3–2

Finals : 1–3 (Home: 0–2; Road: 1–1)

Game	Date	Team	Score	High points	High rebounds	High assists	Location Attendance	Series
1	May 7	@Braves	W 114–109	Stephan Hicks (42)	Stephan Hicks (17)	Yang Chin-Min (10)	Taipei Heping Basketball Gymnasium; 7,000	1–0
2	May 9	@Braves	L 82–106	Stephan Hicks (19)	Anthony Tucker (13)	Anthony Tucker (10)	Taipei Heping Basketball Gymnasium; 7,000	1–1
3	May 13	Braves	L 110–114 (OT)	Stephan Hicks (31)	Stephan Hicks (18)	Lee Te-Wei (6)	Changhua County Stadium; 0	1–2
4	May 15	Taipei Fubon Braves	L 115–90	Stephan Hicks (33)	Stephan Hicks (17)	Kenneth Chien (8)	Changhua County Stadium; 0	1–3

2020–21 schedule

==== Playoffs note ====
- Due to the COVID-19 pandemic, the league officials declared to change the location of game 5 from Taoyuan Arena to Changhua County Stadium.

==== Finals note ====
- Due to the COVID-19 pandemic, the league officials declared that game 3 and game 4 would be played behind closed doors and game 5 to game 7 would be cancelled.

== Player statistics ==
Legend
GP	Games played	MPG	Minutes per game	2P%	2-point field goal percentage
3P%	3-point field goal percentage	FT%	Free throw percentage	RPG	Rebounds per game
APG	Assists per game	SPG	Steals per game	BPG	Blocks per game
PPG	Points per game		Led the league

=== Regular season ===
Player	GP	MPG	PPG	2P%	3P%	FT%	RPG	APG	SPG	BPG
Chen Jen-Jei	9	11:38	4.00	41.67%	22.22%	88.89%	1.89	0.78	0.67	0.00
Tien Lei	5	09:15	4.80	40.00%	33.33%	62.50%	2.00	0.40	0.40	0.00
Anthony Tucker	17	42:11	27.88	52.36%	29.76%	76.47%	8.12	5.59	2.06	0.41
Yang Chin-Min	19	34:48	13.42	58.25%	27.50%	65.45%	5.05	2.95	1.21	0.00
Chi Sung-Yu (Note: Waived during the season)	Did not play									
Wang Po-Chih	15	09:22	2.00	43.33%	0.00%	66.67%	1.40	0.13	0.20	0.13
Lin Chun-Chi	20	20:38	9.90	48.08%	48.24%	71.43%	1.60	1.50	0.45	0.05
Jerran Young	19	34:54	20.68	46.04%	34.93%	75.00%	9.37	3.63	3.32	0.47
Jonah Morrison	14	16:00	3.07	21.43%	32.43%	16.67%	2.79	0.64	0.21	0.43
Stephan Hicks (Note: Acquired during the season)	10	35:09	22.50	43.75%	27.47%	81.25%	12.30	1.80	2.10	0.40
Yang Shen-Yen	18	19:05	3.11	42.31%	19.15%	77.78%	1.17	1.33	0.44	0.00
Derek King	6	09:56	2.33	25.00%	33.33%	42.86%	0.33	0.17	0.33	0.17
Kenneth Chien	21	28:38	6.62	42.27%	28.57%	67.50%	3.14	2.00	1.05	0.24
Randall Walko	18	25:14	9.67	45.10%	38.55%	76.19%	5.28	0.61	0.78	0.33
Lee Te-Wei	22	36:41	8.50	38.69%	28.57%	57.69%	8.27	1.59	0.82	1.09
Wu Sung-Wei	10	17:07	5.40	0.00%	36.96%	50.00%	1.90	0.50	0.50	0.00

=== Playoffs and finals ===
Player	GP	MPG	PPG	2P%	3P%	FT%	RPG	APG	SPG	BPG
Chen Jen-Jei	Did not play									
Tien Lei	Did not play									
Anthony Tucker	2	41:59	18.50	53.85%	37.50%	83.33%	12.50	8.00	2.50	1.00
Yang Chin-Min	9	33:25	12.00	54.05%	34.48%	80.00%	5.67	4.67	0.89	0.33
Wang Po-Chih	7	12:25	4.29	60.87%	0.00%	100.00%	3.00	0.57	0.71	0.00
Lin Chun-Chi	9	21:34	5.78	27.78%	32.50%	75.00%	2.11	2.78	0.67	0.00
Jerran Young	6	30:21	18.83	50.85%	39.39%	73.68%	9.33	4.00	2.83	1.00
Jonah Morrison	Did not play									
Stephan Hicks	9	38:10	27.22	58.12%	27.50%	72.88%	15.22	1.78	1.78	0.44
Yang Shen-Yen	4	06:14	0.75	0.00%	20.00%	0.00%	1.00	0.25	0.00	0.00
Derek King	2	06:38	1.50	50.00%	0.00%	50.00%	0.50	1.00	0.50	0.00
Kenneth Chien	9	31:49	6.89	38.18%	24.00%	20.00%	2.11	2.33	1.00	0.33
Randall Walko	9	23:01	7.11	42.11%	24.44%	75.00%	4.67	1.44	0.33	0.56
Lee Te-Wei	9	36:08	9.78	46.97%	30.43%	38.46%	8.00	3.78	1.11	2.00
Wu Sung-Wei	8	06:14	0.75	0.00%	12.5%	0.00%	0.38	0.25	0.13	0.00

- Reference：

== Transactions ==
=== Overview ===
Players Added

Free agency

- Chen Jen-Jei
- Stephan Hicks
- Derek King
- Lee Te-Wei
- Lin Chun-Chi
- Jonah Morrison
- Randall Walko
- Yang Shen-Yen
Players Lost

Free agency

- Chang Tsung-Hsien
- Chen Hsiao-Jung
- Chen Shih-Nien
- Chen Yu-Han
- Lee Hsueh-Lin
- Ryan Watkins

Waived

- Chang Keng-Yu
- Chi Sung-Yu

=== Free agency ===
==== Re-signed ====
Date	Player	Contract terms	Ref.
August 13, 2020	Tien Lei	1-year contract, worth unknown	
August 13, 2020	Yang Chin-Min	1-year contract, worth unknown	
September 15, 2020	Jerran Young	—	
October 6, 2020	Anthony Tucker	—	
December 15, 2020	Kenneth Chien	—	

==== Additions ====
Date	Player	Contract terms	Former team	Ref.
May 27, 2020	Lin Chun-Chi	—	UCH	
July 22, 2020	Lee Te-Wei	2-year contract worth NT$4 million	Yulon Luxgen Dinos	
August 3, 2020	Jonah Morrison	1+1-year contract, worth unknown	(Canada) UBC Thunderbirds	
October 5, 2020	Yang Shen-Yen	2+1-year contract, worth unknown	(China) Xinjiang Flying Tigers	
October 16, 2020	Chen Jen-Jei	—	(United States) Grand View Vikings	
December 2, 2020	Derek King	—	Macau Wolf Warriors	
December 12, 2020	Stephan Hicks	—	(United States) Fort Wayne Mad Ants	
January 7, 2021	Randall Walko	—	(United States) TCNJ Lions	

==== Subtractions ====
Date	Player	Reason	New team	Ref.
February 29, 2020	Ryan Watkins	contract expired	(Japan) Saitama Broncos	
June 15, 2020	Chen Yu-Han	contract expired	Taiwan Beer	
June 16, 2020	Lee Hsueh-Lin	contract expired	New Taipei CTBC DEA	
July 15, 2020	Chang Tsung-Hsien	contract expired illegal possession of marijuana e-cigarettes	Taipei Fubon Braves	
August 18, 2020	Chen Hsiao-Jung	retirement	—	
November 5, 2020	Chang Keng-Yu	waived	Taoyuan Pilots	
November 20, 2020	Chen Shih-Nien	contract expired	Taiwan Beer	
February 19, 2021	Chi Sung-Yu	retirement	—	

== Awards ==
=== End-of-season awards ===
Recipient	Award	Ref.
Anthony Tucker	Points Leader	
Anthony Tucker	Assists Leader	
Jerran Young	Steals Leader	
Tien Lei	Media Darling	
Randall Walko	6th Man of the Year	
Lee Te-Wei	All-Defensive Team	
Yang Chin-Min	All-PLG Team	

=== Players of the Month ===
Recipient	Award	Month awarded	Ref.
Anthony Tucker	January Most Valuable Player	January	
Lin Chun-Chi	February Most Valuable Player	February	

=== Players of the Week ===
Week	Recipient	Date awarded	Ref.
Preseason	Yang Chin-Min; Lee Te-Wei	October 7 - November 22	
Week 1	Yang Chin-Min	December 19 - December 20	
Week 3	Anthony Tucker; Yang Chin-Min	January 2 - January 3	
Week 4	Anthony Tucker; Yang Chin-Min	January 9 - January 10	
Week 5	Lee Te-Wei	January 16 - January 17	
Week 6	Lee Te-Wei	January 23 - January 24	
Week 7	Anthony Tucker; Yang Chin-Min	January 30 - January 31	
Week 8	Jerran Young; Lee Te-Wei	February 6 - February 7	
Week 9	Anthony Tucker; Lin Chun-Chi	February 20 - February 21	
Week 10	Lin Chun-Chi; Jerran Young	February 27 - March 1	
Week 11	Chen Jen-Jei	March 6 - March 7	
Week 12	Randall Walko	March 13 - March 14	
Week 13	Randall Walko	March 20 - March 21	
Week 14	Lin Chun-Chi	March 27 - March 28	
Week 15	Tien Lei	April 3 - April 5	
