= Stephan Hicks =

American basketball player (born 1992)

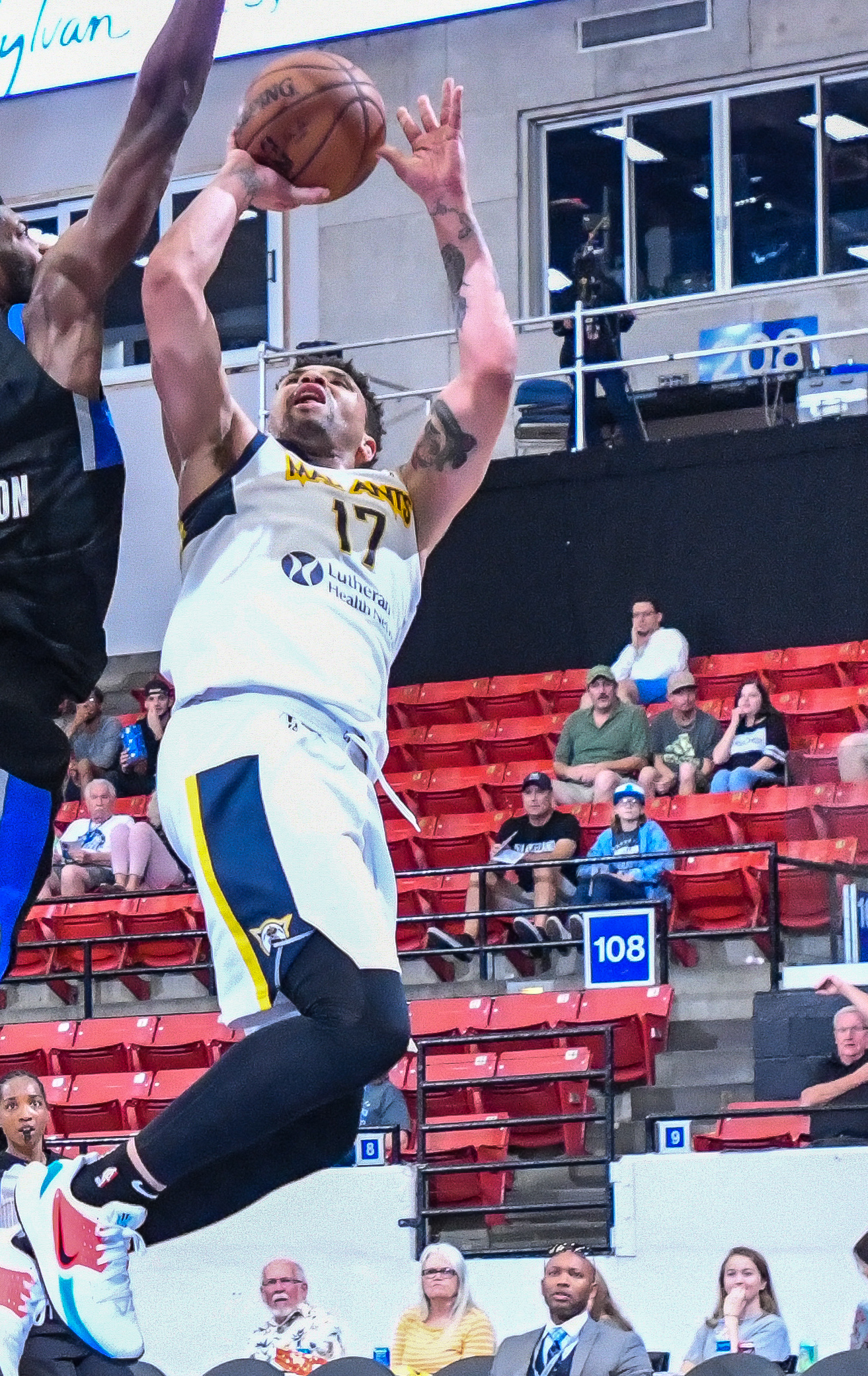

Personal information
- Born: April 2, 1992 (age 34) Los Angeles, California, U.S.
- Listed height: 6 ft 4 in (1.93 m)
- Listed weight: 200 lb (91 kg)

Career information
- High school: Agoura (Agoura Hills, California); National College (Thousand Oaks, California)
- College: Cal State Northridge (2010–2015)
- NBA draft: 2015: undrafted
- Playing career: 2015–2025
- Position: Small forward / shooting guard
- Number: 17

Career history
- 2015–2019: Fort Wayne Mad Ants
- 2019: Anhui PutianXingfa
- 2019–2020: Fort Wayne Mad Ants
- 2020–2021: Formosa Taishin Dreamers
- 2021: BC Samara
- 2021–2022: Fort Wayne Mad Ants
- 2022: Formosa Taishin Dreamers
- 2023–2025: Indiana Mad Ants

Career highlights
- Russian Super League Champion (2021); P. League+ Finals Silver Medalist (2021); No. 17 retired by Indiana Mad Ants; Second-team All-Big West (2015); Big West Freshman of the Year (2012)
- Stats at Basketball Reference

Stephan Keenan Hicks (born April 2, 1992) is an American retired professional basketball player. Hicks played college basketball for Cal State Northridge where he earned 2015 Second-team All-Big West and 2012 Big West Freshman of the Year. Hicks played professionally for over ten years, primarily spending eight seasons with the Fort Wayne / Indiana Mad Ants where his jersey number 17 was retired in 2025.

== High school career ==
Hicks initially attended Agoura High School averaging 17 points, 9.8 rebounds and 2.1 steals per game as a junior. For his senior season he transferred to National College Prep tallying 18 points and six rebounds per game, gaining all-tournament accolades at the Hampton Inn Invitational.

== College career ==
Hicks attended Cal State Northridge averaging 16.0 points and 5.4 rebounds per game as a senior, earning All-Big West second team honors and finished eighth all-time in the conference in career points.

== Professional career ==
=== Fort Wayne Mad Ants (2015–2020) ===
On October 31, 2015, Hicks was selected by the Oklahoma City Blue in the third round of the 2015 NBA Development League Draft and later that night traded to the Fort Wayne Mad Ants in exchange for the rights to James Carlton and a 2016 second round pick to Oklahoma City. On November 15, during the 2015–16 season, he made his professional debut in a 112–92 win over Raptors 905, recording two points, two rebounds and a steal in four minutes. On October 31, 2016, Hicks was reacquired by Fort Wayne for the 2016–17 season.

On January 20, 2019, after four years of G League basketball, and two trips to the playoffs in 2017 and 2018, Hicks was called up to the Indiana Pacers on a 10-day contract, but did not make an appearance in a game. On October 17, 2019, Hicks was reported to have signed with the Indiana Pacers but was later reported to have released by the Indiana Pacers two days later. On October 26, 2019, Hicks was included in the training camp roster for the Fort Wayne Mad Ants. On November 6, 2019, Hicks was included in the opening night roster of the Fort Wayne Mad Ants. In the shortened 2019–20 season, Hicks averaged 14.6 points, 6.5 rebounds and 1.1 assists per game, shooting 52% from the field and 47% from behind the arc.

=== Formosa Taishin Dreamers (2020–2021) ===
On December 12, 2020, Hicks joined Formosa Taishin Dreamers of the Taiwan Professional Basketball League as an import player for their 2020–21 season. He averaged 22.5 points and 12.3 rebounds during the regular season, leading his team to 2021 P. League+ Finals. Hicks averaged 31.3 points and 14.3 rebounds in the Finals however his team fell 3–1 in the series against Taipei Fubon Braves, becoming silver medalists.

=== BC Samara (2021) ===
On August 3, 2021, Hicks joined BC Samara of the VTB United League. Hicks averaged 4.8 points and 4.2 rebounds off the bench as the team won the 2021 Russian Basketball Super League 1 Championship.

=== Return to Fort Wayne Mad Ants (2021–2022) ===
On December 13, 2021, Hicks returned to the Fort Wayne Mad Ants for a second stint. Hicks was then later waived by Fort Wayne on January 8, 2022.

=== Return to Formosa Taishin Dreamers (2022) ===
On February 15, 2022, Hicks returned to Formosa Taishin Dreamers during their 2021–22 season. He averaged 19 points and 15.5 rebounds before his release on March 28, 2022.

On August 26, 2022, Hicks signed with the TaiwanBeer HeroBears of the T1 League. On October 28, 2022, TaiwanBeer HeroBears terminated the contract relationship with Hicks due to injury.

=== Return to Indiana Mad Ants (2023–2025) ===
On October 28, 2023, Hicks returned to the Indiana Mad Ants for a third stint. On March 24, 2025, before a game against the Windy City Bulls, Hicks' jersey number of 17 was officially retired by the Mad Ants, becoming the second player in franchise history to have this honor after Ron Howard in 2017. He played for the Mad Ants organization for 8 seasons, 6 in Fort Wayne and 2 in Indianapolis.

== Career statistics ==
Legend
GP	Games played	GS	Games started	MPG	Minutes per game
FG%	Field goal percentage	3P%	3-point field goal percentage	FT%	Free throw percentage
RPG	Rebounds per game	APG	Assists per game	SPG	Steals per game
BPG	Blocks per game	PPG	Points per game	**Bold**	Career high
*	Led the league

=== Fort Wayne / Indiana Mad Ants ===
==== Regular season ====
Year	Team	GP	GS	MPG	FG%	3P%	FT%	RPG	APG	SPG	BPG	PPG
2015–16	Fort Wayne	32	4	15.9	.435	.340	.804	2.8	.6	.6	**.3**	7.6
2016–17	Fort Wayne	**49**	**48**	30.5	.469	.333	.807	5.8	1.2	1.0	.2	13.6
2017–18	Fort Wayne	**49**	34	29.5	.486	.340	.805	5.4	**1.4**	**1.1**	**.3**	12.7
2018–19	Fort Wayne	48	46	**32.6**	.458	.304	**.856**	**6.9**	1.1	.6	**.3**	**15.4**
2019–20	Fort Wayne	41	26	30.4	.524	**.469**	.806	6.3	1.0	1.0	**.3**	14.7
2021–22	Fort Wayne	2	0	16.5	.250	.000	1.000	3.0	.0	.0	.0	2.0
2023–24	Indiana	15	0	11.5	.434	.296	.833	2.1	.5	.5	.1	4.7
2024–25	Indiana	13	2	14.1	**.553**	.476	.583	3.5	.7	.7	.2	4.8
**Career**		249	161	26.7	.477	.352	.815	5.3	1.0	0.8	0.3	12.1

==== Playoffs ====
Year	Team	GP	GS	MPG	FG%	3P%	FT%	RPG	APG	SPG	BPG	PPG
2017	Fort Wayne	3	3	33.3	.464	.429	.833	4.7	2.0	2.0	.0	11.3
2018	Fort Wayne	1	1	24.0	.333	.000	.500	4.0	1.0	1.0	1.0	7.0
2024	Indiana	Did not play										
2025	Indiana	Did not play										
**Playoff Career**		4	4	30.8	.432	.300	.750	4.5	1.8	1.8	.3	10.3

== Personal life ==
The son of Kim Kitchen and Charles Hicks, he has a sister, Kristiaan, and three brothers, Kaelan, Keaton and Dylan. He majored in business.
