= Charles García =

US-born Belizean professional basketball player

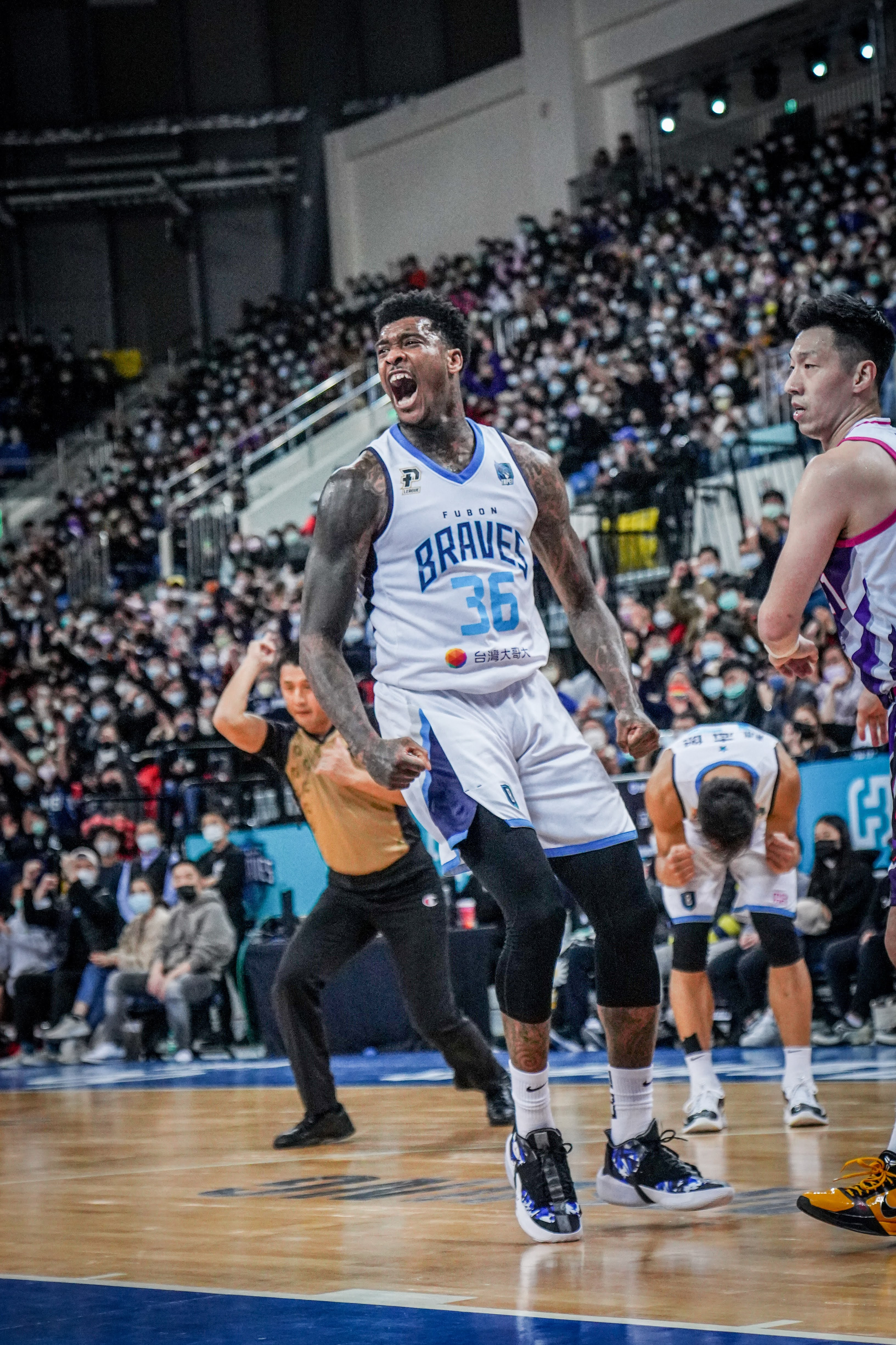
- García with the Taipei Fubon Braves in 2021

Free agent
- Position: Power forward

Personal information
- Born: October 13, 1988 (age 38) Los Angeles, California, U.S.
- Listed height: 6 ft 10 in (2.08 m)
- Listed weight: 230 lb (104 kg)

Career information
- High school: Susan Miller Dorsey (Los Angeles, California)
- College: Riverside JC (2007–2009); Seattle (2009–2010)
- NBA draft: 2010: undrafted
- Playing career: 2010–present

Career history
- 2010: Oyak Renault
- 2010: Utah Flash
- 2010–2011: Potros ITSON
- 2011: Iowa Energy
- 2011–2012: Sioux Falls Skyforce
- 2012: Fort Wayne Mad Ants
- 2012–2013: Baloncesto Fuenlabrada
- 2013: Atléticos de San Germán
- 2013: Al Muharraq
- 2013–2014: Al Ittihad
- 2014–2015: Goyang Orions
- 2015: Seoul Samsung Thunders
- 2015: Vaqueros de Bayamón
- 2016: Grindavík
- 2016–2017: Austin Spurs
- 2017–2018: Bank of Taiwan
- 2018: Barangay Ginebra San Miguel
- 2018: Yokohama B-Corsairs
- 2018–2020: Fubon Braves / Taipei Fubon Braves
- 2020: Taoyuan Pauian Archiland
- 2020–2021: Taipei Fubon Braves
- 2021–2022: Tainan TSG GhostHawks
- 2022: Singapore Adroit
- 2022–2023: Manama Club
- 2023: Gladiadores de Anzoátegui
- 2025: Correbasket UAT
- 2026: Caballeros de Culiacán
- 2026: Zonkeys de Tijuana

Career highlights
- NBA Development League champion (2011); NBA Development League All-Star (2012); SBL Champion (2019); SBL Finals MVP (2019); P.League+ Champion (2021)
- Stats at Basketball Reference

Charles Wayne García Jr. (born October 13, 1988) is an American-born Belizean professional basketball player. He played college basketball for Seattle University after first spending two seasons at Riverside City College.

== Early life ==
García was born in the United States to Belizean immigrants. Through his father, García is of Costa Rican descent.

== Professional career ==
García started the 2010–11 season in Turkey with Oyak Renault, but left after just two games. Between November and December 2010, he played in the NBA Development League for the Utah Flash before moving to Mexico to play for Potros ITSON until January 2011. He returned to the D-League in April 2011, where he joined the Iowa Energy. García spent the entire 2011–12 season in the D-League playing for the Sioux Falls Skyforce and Fort Wayne Mad Ants.

For the 2012–13 season, García moved to Spain to play for Baloncesto Fuenlabrada. He managed 15 games for the club before leaving in January 2013. Two months later, he joined Puerto Rican team Atléticos de San Germán for a two-month stint.

García split the 2013–14 season with two Bahraini teams, Al Muharraq and Al Ittihad, and split the 2014–15 season with two South Korean teams, Goyang Orions and Seoul Samsung Thunders. García returned to Puerto Rico in March 2015, where he joined Vaqueros de Bayamón.

In January 2016, García joined Grindavík of the Icelandic Úrvalsdeild karla. In 10 regular season games he averaged 19.9 points and 9.2 rebounds per game. In the playoffs, Grindavík lost to KR in 3 games, with García averaging 14.7 points and 7.3 rebounds.

On October 30, 2016, García was selected by the Austin Spurs in the fourth round of the 2016 NBA Development League Draft.

On April 20, 2018, Garcia signed with the Barangay Ginebra San Miguel of the Philippine Basketball Association as their import for the 2018 PBA Commissioner's Cup. But he was let go on May 21, after Ginebra hobbled to a 1–3 start. He was replaced by resident import Justin Brownlee.

In the 2018–2019 season of the Super Basketball League, Garcia joined the Fubon Braves and finished the regular season averaging 19.2ppg along with 11.6rpg. The season was capped off with a 4–0 finals sweep of Taiwan Beer, giving the Braves their first SBL Championship in team history. Garcia was named finals MVP finishing with averages of 22.3ppg, 11.8rpg.

On November 4, 2020, Garcia signed with the Taipei Fubon Braves.

On October 22, 2021, Garcia signed with the Tainan TSG GhostHawks of the T1 League.
