= Ihor Zaytsev (basketball) =

Ukrainian basketball player (born 1989)

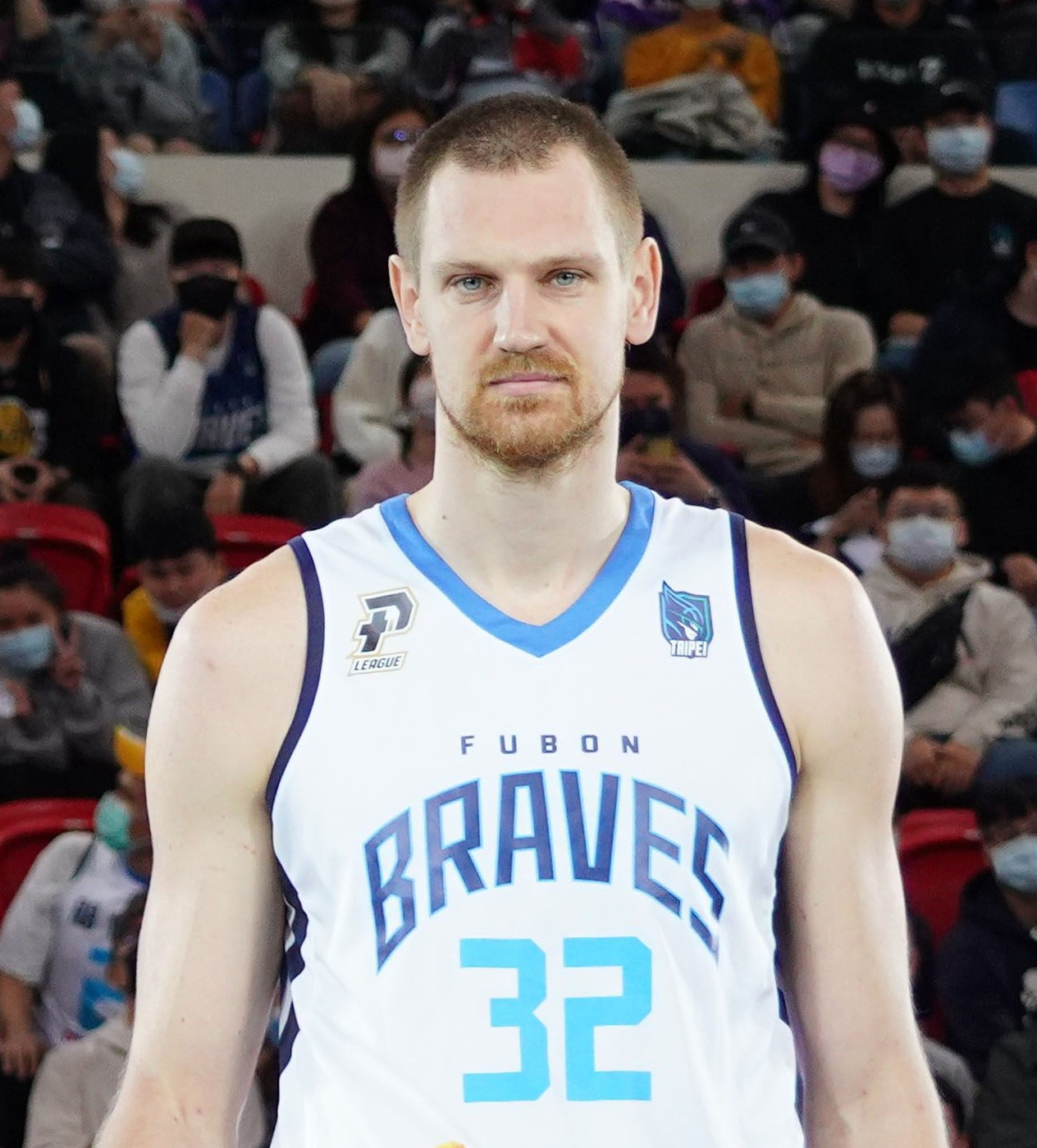
- Zaytsev in January 2021

Free Agent
- Position: Power forward

Personal information
- Born: 11 May 1989 (age 37) Dnipropetrovsk, Ukrainian SSR, Soviet Union
- Listed height: 2.10 m (6 ft 11 in)
- Listed weight: 110 kg (243 lb)

Career information
- Playing career: 2008–present

Career history
- 2008–2011: Kryvbasbasket
- 2011–2014: Azovmash
- 2014–2015: Khimik
- 2015: Petrochimi Bandar Imam
- 2015–2016: Rosa Radom
- 2016: Stelmet Zielona Góra
- 2016–2017: Bàsquet Manresa
- 2017–2018: Rosa Radom
- 2018–2020: Taiwan Beer
- 2019: Chongqing Huaxi International
- 2020–2024: Taipei Fubon Braves
- 2024: Taipei Taishin Mars

Career highlights
- 3x P.League+ champion (2021, 2022, 2023); P.League+ Import of the Year (2021); SBL Best Foreign Player of the year (2019); Polish Cup winner (2016); Ukrainian League champion (2015)

Ihor Zaytsev (born 11 May 1989) is a Ukrainian basketball player who last played for the Taipei Taishin Mars of the Taiwan Professional Basketball League (TPBL).

== Professional career ==
After having started the 2016–17 season with the Polish team Stelmet Zielona Góra, on 9 December 2016, Zaytsev signed with the Spanish team Manresa. On February 6, 2017, he parted ways with Manresa after appearing in seven games. Four days later, he returned to his former club Rosa Radom.

On August 26, 2024, Zaytsev signed with the Taipei Taishin Mars of the Taiwan Professional Basketball League (TPBL). On November 19, Taipei Taishin Mars terminated the contract relationship with Zaytsev.
