= Yang Chin-min =

Taiwanese basketball player

Yang Chin-min 楊敬敏
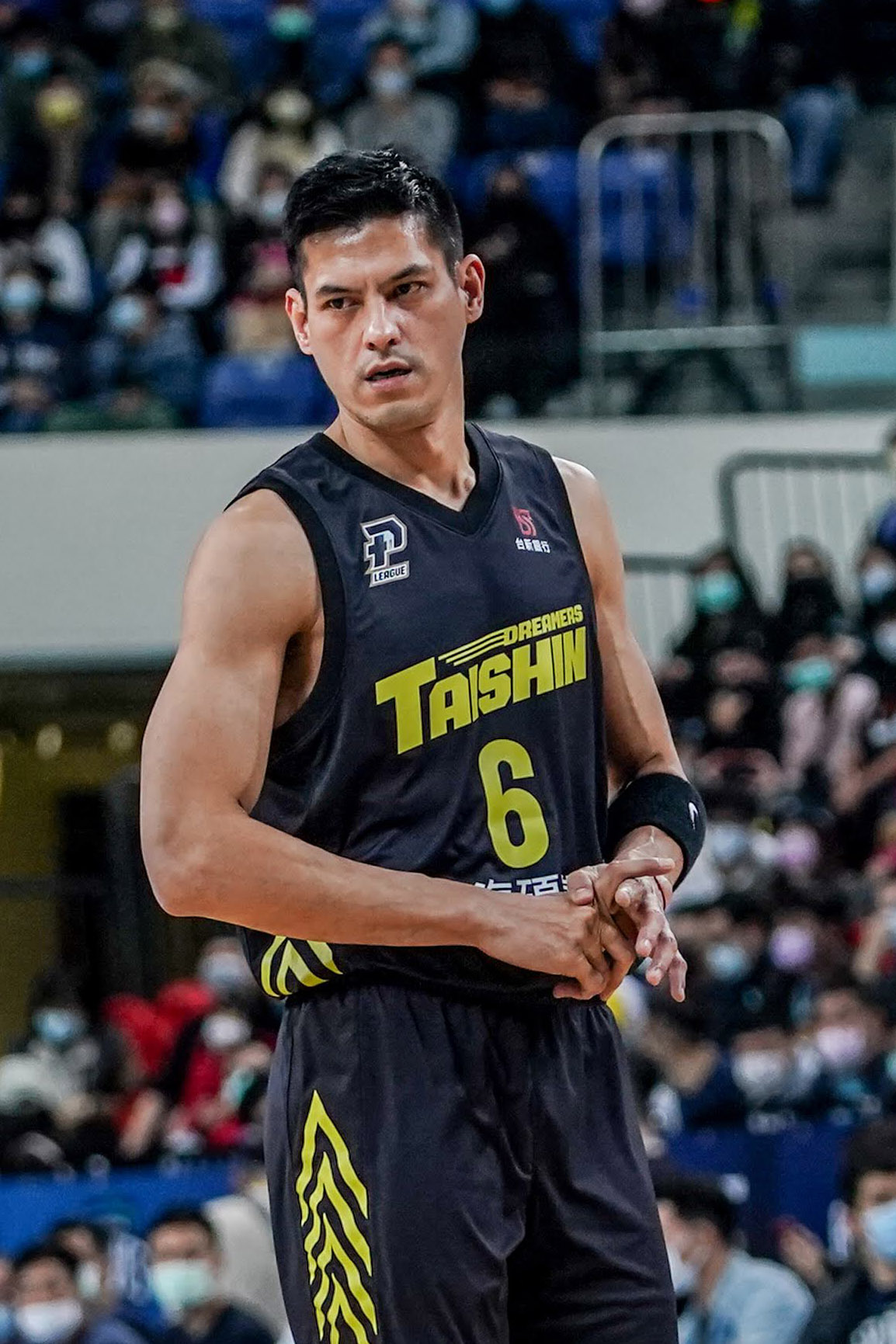
- Yang Jingmin

Taiwan Beer
- Title: Assistant coach
- League: Super Basketball League

Personal information
- Born: 22 January 1984 (age 42) Hualien County, Taiwan
- Listed height: 6 ft 3 in (1.91 m)
- Listed weight: 203 lb (92 kg)

Career information
- High school: Nanshan Senior High School
- College: Fu Jen Catholic University
- Playing career: 2003–2024
- Position: Shooting guard

Career history

Playing
- 2003–2007: Bank of Taiwan (basketball)
- 2007–2012: Taiwan Beer (basketball)
- 2012–2013: Shanxi Loongs
- 2013–2014: Xinjiang Flying Tigers
- 2014-2016: Shanghai Sharks
- 2016–2019: Beijing Royal Fighters
- 2019–2021: Formosa Taishin Dreamers
- 2021–2024: New Taipei Kings

Coaching
- 2025–present: Taiwan Beer (assistant)

Career highlights
- P. League+ champion (2024)
Medals
Men's basketball
Representing Chinese Taipei
East Asian Games
Gold medal – first place	2005 Macau
Silver medal – second place	2009 Hong Kong
Gold medal – first place	2013 Tianjin

Yang Chin-min (Chinese: 楊敬敏; pinyin: Yáng Jìngmǐn; born 22 January 1984) is a Taiwanese professional basketball coach and former player. Recently, he is the assistant coach of Taiwan Beer of the Super Basketball League (SBL). He formerly played for the Taiwan Beer of the Super Basketball League. Yang also plays for the Chinese Taipei national basketball team and made his national team debut at the FIBA Asia Championship 2009.

Yang played primarily off the bench for the Chinese Taipei team at the 2009 Asian Championship. In his most extensive action of the tournament, he scored a game-high of 24 points in Chinese Taipei's preliminary round victory over Kuwait. He also scored a team-high 19 points in Chinese Taipei's 87-79 victory over Qatar in the fifth-place game.
