= Taoyuan Pauian Pilots all-time roster =

The following is a list of players, both past and current, who appeared at least in one game for the Taoyuan Pauian Pilots (2020–present) franchise.

== Players ==
G	Guard	G/F	Guard-forward	F	Forward	F/C	Forward-center	C	Center

^{x}	Denotes player who is currently on the Taoyuan Pilots roster

=== A ===
Player	Chinese Name	Pos.	From	Yrs	Seasons	Ref.
Jeff Ayres	艾爾斯	F/C	Arizona State University	1	2022–2023	

=== B ===
Player	Chinese Name	Pos.	From	Yrs	Seasons	Ref.
Nemanja Bešović	貝索維奇	C	Serbia	1	2021–2022	
Julian Boyd^{x}	布依德	F	LIU Brooklyn	1	2024–present	
Alec Brown^{x}	伯朗	C	University of Wisconsin–Green Bay	2	2023–present	

=== C ===
Player	Chinese Name	Pos.	From	Yrs	Seasons	Ref.
Chang Chen-Ya	張鎮衙	F	National Chengchi University	2	2022–2024	
Chang Keng-Yu	張耕淯	F	National Taiwan University of Sport	1	2020–2021	
Jordan Chatman	喬登	G	Boston College	1	2020–2021	
Chen Ching-Huan	陳靖寰	F	Fu Jen Catholic University	1	2020–2021	
Chen Kuan-Chuan	陳冠全	C	National Taiwan Sport University	3	2020–2023	
Chen Li-Sheng^{x}	陳力生	G	National Taiwan Sport University	1	2024–present	
Chen Yu-Han	陳昱翰	G	I-Shou University	1	2023–2024	
Chen Yu-Jui^{x}	陳昱瑞	G	National Taiwan Sport University	4	2021–present	
Chiao Chu-Yu^{x}	喬楚瑜	C	Fu Jen Catholic University	1	2023–present	
Chieng Li-Huan	成力煥	G	National Chiao Tung University	1	2022–2023	
Chou Yi-Hsiang	周儀翔	G	Salt Lake Community College	1	2023–2024	

=== D ===
Player	Chinese Name	Pos.	From	Yrs	Seasons	Ref.
Quincy Davis	戴維斯	F/C	Tulane University	1	2020–2021	
Amdy Dieng^{x}	丁恩迪	C	National Chengchi University	2	2022–present	

=== G ===
Player	Chinese Name	Pos.	From	Yrs	Seasons	Ref.
John Gillon	吉倫	G	Syracuse University	1	2021–2022	
Treveon Graham^{x}	葛拉漢	F	Virginia Commonwealth University	1	2023–present	

=== H ===
Player	Chinese Name	Pos.	From	Yrs	Seasons
Huang Hung-Han	黃泓瀚	F	Chien Hsin University of Science and Technology	2	2021–2023

=== J ===
Player	Chinese Name	Pos.	From	Yrs	Seasons	Ref.
Kadeem Jack	傑克	F	Rutgers University	1	2020–2021	
Jarrod Jones^{x}	瓊斯	F	Ball State University	1	2024–present	

=== K ===
Player	Chinese Name	Pos.	From	Yrs	Seasons	Ref.
Kuan Ta-You^{x}	關達祐	G	National Taiwan Sport University	5	2020–present	

=== L ===
Player	Chinese Name	Pos.	From	Yrs	Seasons	Ref.
Lai Kuo-Wei	賴國維	G	National Taiwan University of Arts	1	2020–2021	
Anthony Lawrence	勞倫斯	F	University of Miami	1	2023–2024	
Lee Hsueh-Lin	李學林	G	Taipei Physical Education College	1	2023–2024	
Li Chia-Kang^{x}	李家慷	G	National Taiwan Sport University	3	2021–present	
Lin Cheng^{x}	林正	C	National Taiwan Sport University	4	2020–present	
Lin Chin-Pang	林金榜	F	National Taiwan College of Physical Education	1	2021–2022	
Lin Tzu-Wei^{x}	林子洧	G	National Kaohsiung Normal University	3	2021–present	
Lin Yao-Tsung	林耀宗	F	MingDao University	2	2020–2022	
Lu Chun-Hsiang^{x}	盧峻翔	G	Fu Jen Catholic University	4	2021–present	

=== M ===
Player	Chinese Name	Pos.	From	Yrs	Seasons	Ref.
Kennedy Meeks^{x}	密克斯	C	University of North Carolina at Chapel Hill	1	2023–present	

=== P ===
Player	Chinese Name	Pos.	From	Yrs	Seasons	Ref.
Pai Yao-Cheng^{x}	白曜誠	G	I-Shou University	2	2022–present	
Peng Chun-Yen	彭俊諺	G	MingDao University	1	2020–2021	

=== R ===
Player	Chinese Name	Pos.	From	Yrs	Seasons
Davon Reed	里德	F	University of Miami	1	2020–2021
Devin Robinson	羅賓森	F	University of Florida	1	2021–2022

=== S ===
Player	Chinese Name	Pos.	From	Yrs	Seasons	Ref.
Sani Sakakini	桑尼	F	Palestine	1	2022–2023	
Shih Chin-Yao	施晉堯	F	Chinese Culture University	3	2020–2023	
Shih Yen-Tsung	施顏宗	F	I-Shou University	2	2021–2023	
Su Chih-Cheng	蘇志誠	G	National Taiwan Sport University	2	2021–2023	
Sun Szu-Yao	孫思堯	C	New York Institute of Technology	1	2020–2021	

=== T ===
Player	Chinese Name	Pos.	From	Yrs	Seasons	Ref.
Jordan Tolbert	喬丹	F	Southern Methodist University	1	2021–2022	
Anthony Tucker	塔克	G	University of Minnesota	1	2023–2024	

=== W ===
Player	Chinese Name	Pos.	From	Yrs	Seasons	Ref.
Willie Warren	沃倫	G	University of Oklahoma	1	2020–2021	
Jason Washburn	沃許本	C	University of Utah	2	2022–2024	
Wen Li-Huang	溫立煌	F	I-Shou University	1	2021–2022	
Wu Chia-Chun	吳家駿	G	National Taiwan Sport University	1	2021–2022	
