= 2020–21 Taoyuan Pilots season =

Taiwanese professional basketball season

Taoyuan Pilots
2020-21 season
- President: Li Chung-Shu
- General Manager: Chen Hsin-An
- Head Coach: Liu I-Hsiang (resigned); Yang I-Feng (interim)
- Arena: Taoyuan Arena
- P. League+: 10-14(.417)
- Playoffs: P. League+ Playoffs (lost to Dreamers 2-3)
- Scoring leader: Davon Reed(25.67)
- Rebounding leader: Kadeem Jack(13.17)
- Assists leader: Davon Reed(4.80)
- Highest home attendance: 4,537 (April 5, 2021)
- Lowest home attendance: 0 (January 16, 2021 to February 7, 2021)
- Average home attendance: 992(regular season)
- Biggest win: Pilots 111-82 Lioneers (February 6, 2021)
- Biggest defeat: Pilots 82-132 Lioneers (March 28, 2021)
- All statistics correct as of November 7, 2021.

The 2020–21 Taoyuan Pilots season was the first season of the franchise in the P. LEAGUE+ (PLG), first season overall, and its first in the Taoyuan City and playing home games at Taoyuan Arena. The Pilots were originally coached by Liu Yi-Hsiang, Liu resigned as head coach on December 22, 2020, due to personal matters. Yang I-Feng is currently acting as head coach temporarily.

== Preseason ==
On September 9, 2020, former Taiwanese professional basketball player Blackie Chen announcing the establishment of P. LEAGUE+ (PLG). The first game of PLG regular season was started on December 19, 2020.

== Draft ==
The P. LEAGUE+ (PLG) did not hold a draft in its first season.

== Standings ==
Team	GP	W	L	PCT
z – Taipei Fubon Braves	24	19	5	.792
x – Taoyuan Pilots	24	10	14	.417
x – Formosa Taishin Dreamers	24	10	14	.417
Hsinchu JKO Lioneers	24	9	15	.375

== Roster ==
Note: Flags indicate national team eligibility at FIBA-sanctioned events. Players may hold other non-FIBA nationalities not displayed.

2020–21 Taoyuan Pilots roster
Players
Coaches

Pos.	No.	Nat.	Name	Ht.	Wt.	DOB (YYYY-MM-DD)	From
G	3	(Chinese Taipei)	Ting Sheng-Ju	1.74 m (5 ft 9 in)	70 kg (154 lb)	28 – 22 August 1998	St. Francis
F	5	(United States)	Davon Reed (I)	1.96 m (6 ft 5 in)	95 kg (209 lb)	31 – 11 June 1995	Miami (FL)
G	6	(Chinese Taipei)	Kuan Ta-You	1.80 m (5 ft 11 in)	78 kg (172 lb)	29 – 15 September 1997	NTSU
F	7	(Chinese Taipei)	Lin Yao-Tsung	1.93 m (6 ft 4 in)	92 kg (203 lb)	36 – 7 September 1990	MingDao
G	8	(Chinese Taipei)	Chen Shih-Chieh (injured)	1.76 m (5 ft 9 in)	75 kg (165 lb)	42 – 24 September 1984	THSH
F	12	(United States)	Jordan Chatman (I)	1.96 m (6 ft 5 in)	88 kg (194 lb)	33 – 21 May 1993	Boston College
C	15	(Chinese Taipei)	Sun Szu-Yao	2.00 m (6 ft 7 in)	100 kg (220 lb)	31 – 1 July 1995	NYIT
G	18	(Chinese Taipei)	Lai Kuo-Wei	1.80 m (5 ft 11 in)	80 kg (176 lb)	36 – 2 March 1990	NTUA
F	23	(Chinese Taipei)	Chen Ching-Huan	1.90 m (6 ft 3 in)	88 kg (194 lb)	40 – 3 February 1986	THSH
C	25	(Chinese Taipei)	Lin Cheng	2.02 m (6 ft 8 in)	98 kg (216 lb)	26 – 25 July 2000	NTSU
F	28	(Chinese Taipei)	Shih Chin-Yao	1.88 m (6 ft 2 in)	85 kg (187 lb)	35 – 28 October 1990	Chinese Culture
F	29	(Chinese Taipei)	Chang Keng-Yu	1.88 m (6 ft 2 in)	85 kg (187 lb)	31 – 16 October 1995	NTUS
C	30	(Chinese Taipei)	Chen Kuan-Chuan	1.98 m (6 ft 6 in)	115 kg (254 lb)	32 – 30 December 1993	NTSU
C	40	(United States) (Trinidad and Tobago)	Kadeem Jack (I)	2.06 m (6 ft 9 in)	107 kg (236 lb)	33 – 27 October 1992	Rutgers
C	50	(Chinese Taipei)	Quincy Davis	2.03 m (6 ft 8 in)	100 kg (220 lb)	43 – 16 February 1983	Tulane
G	63	(Chinese Taipei)	Peng Chun-Yen	1.83 m (6 ft 0 in)	82 kg (181 lb)	36 – 5 December 1989	MingDao

Head coach

- (Chinese Taipei) Yang I-Feng (Interim)

Assistant coach(es)

- (Chinese Taipei) Yang I-Feng
- (Chinese Taipei) Huang Chi-Feng

Strength & conditioning coach(es)

- (Chinese Taipei) Mu Chien-Hung

Athletic trainer(s)

- (Chinese Taipei) Peng Li-Chen

Team manager

- (Chinese Taipei) Chen Wei-Lun

Legend

- (C) Team captain
- (I) Import player
- Injured

== Game log ==
=== Preseason ===
2020 preseason game log Total: 0-6 (home:0-2, Road:0-4)
Game	Date	Team	Score	High points	High rebounds	High assists	Location attendance	Record
1	October 17	Taipei Fubon Braves	L 67-75	Shih Chin-Yao (23)	Shih Yen-Tsung (10)	Wu Jia-Jun (5)	Hsinchu County Stadium; 8,068	0-1
2	October 18	@Formosa Dreamers	L 77-84	Lin Yao-Tsung (19)	Sun Szu-Yao (14)	Wu Jia-Jun (4)	Hsinchu County Stadium; 7,888	0-2
3	November 7	@Taipei Fubon Braves	L 71-109	Shih Chin-Yao (20)	Lin Yao-Tsung (8)	Chen Ching-Huan (4); Shih Yen-Tsung (4)	Taipei Heping Basketball Gymnasium; 6,459	0-3
4	November 8	@Hsinchu Lioneers	L 87-92	Shih Chin-Yao (21)	Shih Yen-Tsung (10); Chen Kuan-Chuan (10)	Chen Kuan-Chuan (4); Chen Ching-Huan (4); Chin-Yao Shih (4)	Taipei Heping Basketball Gymnasium; 6,606	0-4
5	November 21	Formosa Taishin Dreamers	L 86-93	Shih Chin-Yao (23)	Shih Chin-Yao (13)	Shih Chin-Yao (9)	National Taiwan University of Sport Gymnasium; 4,500	0-5
6	November 22	@Hsinchu Lioneers	L 87-96	Lin Yao-Tsung (23)	Lin Yao-Tsung(17)	Shih Chin-Yao (5)	National Taiwan University of Sport Gymnasium; 4,700	0-6

=== Regular season ===
2020–21 regular season game log Total:10-14 (home: 3–9, Road:7-5)
Game	Date	Team	Score	High points	High rebounds	High assists	Location attendance	Record
1	December 20	@Formosa Taishin Dreamers	W 103-83	Kadeem Jack (22)	Quincy Davis (14); Kadeem Jack (14)	Davon Reed (10)	Changhua County Stadium; 3,689	1-0
2	December 26	@Hsinchu JKO Lioneers	L 91-97	Davon Reed (39)	Quincy Davis (15)	Peng Chun-Yen (4); Davon Reed (4)	Hsinchu County Stadium; 6,688	1-1
3	January 2	@Taipei Fubon Braves	L 83-93	Davon Reed (31)	Davon Reed (12)	Davon Reed (6)	Taipei Heping Basketball Gymnasium; 7,000	1-2
4	January 3	Formosa Taishin Dreamers	W 104-100	Kadeem Jack (27)	Kadeem Jack (12)	Willie Warren (11)	Taoyuan Arena; 3,862	2-2
5	January 16	Hsinchu JKO Lioneers	W 106-91	Davon Reed (31)	Davon Reed (12); Chen Kuan-Chuan (12)	Willie Warren (7)	Taoyuan Arena; 0	3-2
6	January 17	Formosa Taishin Dreamers	W 90-86	Davon Reed (27)	Kadeem Jack (18)	Davon Reed (5)	Taoyuan Arena; 0	4-2
7	January 23	Formosa Taishin Dreamers	W 89-84	Kadeem Jack (31)	Kadeem Jack (19)	Davon Reed (6)	Taoyuan Arena; 0	5-2
8	January 24	Taipei Fubon Braves	L 79-102	Davon Reed (26); Quincy Davis (26)	Quincy Davis (17)	Willie Warren (6)	Taoyuan Arena; 0	5-3
9	January 30	Taipei Fubon Braves	L 97-110	Davon Reed (31)	Davon Reed (14); Kadeem Jack (14)	Shih Chin-Yao (7)	Taoyuan Arena; 0	5-4
10	January 31	Hsinchu JKO Lioneers	L 72-84	Davon Reed (20)	Kadeem Jack (15)	Peng Chun-Yen (5)	Taoyuan Arena; 0	5-5
11	February 6	Hsinchu JKO Lioneers	W 111-82	Chang Keng-Yu (27)	Davon Reed (13)	Peng Chun-Yen (9)	Taoyuan Arena; 0	6-5
12	February 7	Taipei Fubon Braves	W 97-82	Davon Reed (27)	Davon Reed (12); Kadeem Jack (12)	Shih Chin-Yao (6)	Taoyuan Arena; 0	7-5
13	February 20	Hsinchu JKO Lioneers	W 108-102	Kadeem Jack (32)	Kadeem Jack (16)	Peng Chun-Yen (7)	Taoyuan Arena; 2,000	8-5
14	February 21	Formosa Taishin Dreamers	L 99-102	Davon Reed (20)	Kadeem Jack (15)	Kuan Ta-You (8)	Taoyuan Arena; 1,500	8-6
15	February 27	@Hsinchu JKO Lioneers	W 106-98	Davon Reed (43)	Kadeem Jack (12); Quincy Davis (12)	Kuan Ta-You (9)	Hsinchu County Stadium; 5,103	9-6
16	February 28	@Formosa Taishin Dreamers	L 90-98	Kadeem Jack (23)	Kadeem Jack (18)	Shih Chin-Yao (5)	Changhua County Stadium; 3,876	9-7
17	March 13	@Hsinchu JKO Lioneers	L 88-105	Kadeem Jack (38)	Kadeem Jack (11)	Peng Chun-Yen (7)	Hsinchu County Stadium; 5,188	9-8
18	March 14	@Taipei Fubon Braves	L 94-124	Jordan Chatman (21)	Lin Cheng (9)	Peng Chun-Yen (7)	Taipei Heping Basketball Gymnasium; 5,993	9-9
19	March 21	@Formosa Taishin Dreamers	L 100-107	Kadeem Jack (37)	Kadeem Jack (18)	Shih Chin-Yao (7); Peng Chun-Yen (7)	National Taiwan University of Sport Gymnasium; 3,976	9-10
20	March 27	@Taipei Fubon Braves	L 93-109	Jordan Chatman (21)	Kadeem Jack (13)	Shih Chin-Yao (6)	Taipei Heping Basketball Gymnasium; 6,238	9-11
21	March 28	@Hsinchu JKO Lioneers	L 82-132	Jordan Chatman (15)	Kadeem Jack (10)	Peng Chun-Yen (6); Kuan Ta-You (6)	Hsinchu County Stadium; 5,978	9-12
22	April 3	@Formosa Taishin Dreamers	W 106-95	Jordan Chatman (34)	Lin Yao-Tsung (19)	Peng Chun-Yen (6)	Changhua County Stadium; 5,100	10-12
23	April 5	Taipei Fubon Braves	L 100-110	Shih Chin-Yao (31)	Lin Cheng (12)	Chen Kuan-Chuan (5)	Taoyuan Arena; 4,537	10-13
24	April 10	@Taipei Fubon Braves	L 101-117	Jordan Chatman (27)	Lin Cheng (11)	Kuan Ta-You (7)	Taipei Heping Basketball Gymnasium; 6,482	10-14

==== Regular season note ====
- Due to the COVID-19 pandemic, the Taoyuan City Government and Taoyuan Pilots declared that the games in Taoyuan Arena would be played behind closed doors from January 16, 2021, to February 7, 2021.

=== Playoffs ===
2020–21 playoffs game log Total: 2-3 (home: 1–2; road: 1–1)
Game	Date	Team	Score	High points	High rebounds	High assists	Location Attendance	Series
1	April 23	Formosa Taishin Dreamers	L 63-102	Jordan Chatman (13)	Lin Yao-Tsung (9)	Kuan Ta-You (5)	Taoyuan Arena; 2,977	0-1
2	April 25	Formosa Taishin Dreamers	W 91-86	Jordan Chatman (21)	Quincy Davis (16)	Quincy Davis (5); Jordan Chatman (5)	Taoyuan Arena; 4,758	1-1
3	April 28	@Formosa Taishin Dreamers	W 82-79	Jordan Chatman (23)	Quincy Davis (12)	Lin Yao-Tsung (5); Jordan Chatman (5)	Changhua County Stadium; 3,612	2-1
4	April 30	@Formosa Taishin Dreamers	L 74-103	Jordan Chatman (26)	Lin Yao-Tsung (9)	Kuan Ta-You (4)	Changhua County Stadium; 4,015	2-2
5	May 2	Formosa Taishin Dreamers	L 91-93	Jordan Chatman (21)	Quincy Davis (11)	Lin Yao-Tsung (9)	Changhua County Stadium; 3,003	2-3

==== Playoffs note ====
- Due to the COVID-19 pandemic, the league officials declared to change the location of Game 5 from Taoyuan Arena to Changhua County Stadium.
- The Pilots lost the Dreamers with 2–3 in the 2021 P. League+ Playoffs.

== Player statistics ==
Legend
GP	Games played	MPG	Minutes per game	2P%	2-point field goal percentage
3P%	3-point field goal percentage	FT%	Free throw percentage	RPG	Rebounds per game
APG	Assists per game	SPG	Steals per game	BPG	Blocks per game
PPG	Points per game		Led the league

=== Regular season ===
Player	GP	MPG	PPG	2P%	3P%	FT%	RPG	APG	SPG	BPG
Ting Sheng-Ju	Did not play									
Davon Reed	15	39:55	25.67	48.81%	37.50%	74.73%	9.67	4.80	1.93	1.00
Kuan Ta-You	21	22:35	7.33	43.16%	25.37%	55.26%	2.86	3.14	1.14	0.05
Lin Yao-Tsung	22	17:02	5.14	49.43%	19.35%	34.62%	4.45	0.91	0.73	0.05
Chen Shih-Chieh	Did not play									
Jordan Chatman	8	33:30	18.75	47.92%	40.00%	100.00%	5.13	2.50	1.00	0.88
Willie Warren	4	36:46	12.75	44.83%	15.38%	100.00%	6.75	7.00	1.50	0.00
Sun Szu-Yao	9	09:23	1.56	50.00%	0.00%	0.00%	2.56	0.11	0.22	0.11
Lai Kuo-Wei	14	06:06	1.64	25.00%	31.58%	50.00%	0.64	1.00	0.29	0.00
Chen Ching-Huan	23	15:36	4.30	53.13%	30.51%	73.33%	1.61	1.43	0.48	0.17
Lin Cheng	12	15:29	3.92	44.44%	25.00%	52.94%	5.00	0.75	0.33	0.25
Shih Chin-Yao	24	32:39	14.17	48.91%	37.25%	57.38%	3.25	3.63	1.29	0.17
Chang Keng-Yu	23	14:24	6.48	40.86%	30.91%	75.86%	1.70	0.78	0.43	0.13
Chen Kuan-Chuan	24	26:54	5.92	41.35%	27.27%	84.62%	4.67	1.38	0.71	0.25
Kadeem Jack	18	34:24	20.39	54.33%	26.67%	57.89%	13.17	2.00	1.00	1.28
Quincy Davis	16	29:27	13.00	60.58%	36.17%	67.39%	10.13	1.88	1.00	2.44
Peng Chun-Yen	16	20:38	2.94	17.86%	20.59%	66.67%	2.50	4.63	1.19	0.06

=== Playoffs ===
Player	GP	MPG	PPG	2P%	3P%	FT%	RPG	APG	SPG	BPG
Ting Sheng-Ju	Did not play									
Davon Reed	Did not play									
Kuan Ta-You	5	20:56	5.00	39.13%	7.14%	66.67%	4.40	2.40	0.60	0.00
Lin Yao-Tsung	5	34:00	7.40	40.48%	0.00%	21.43%	8.40	4.00	2.60	0.00
Chen Shih-Chien	Did not play									
Jordan Chatman	5	41:15	20.8	35.48%	40.00%	84.21%	6.20	3.20	1.80	0.40
Sun Szu-Yao	Did not play									
Lai Kuo-Wei	1	05:26	0.00	0.00%	0.00%	0.00%	1.00	3.00	1.00	0.00
Chen Ching-Huan	5	09:12	1.20	0.00%	25.00%	0.00%	2.00	0.40	0.00	0.00
Lin Cheng	5	13:22	2.00	35.71%	0.00%	0.00%	3.60	0.80	0.00	0.60
Shih Chin-Yao	5	37:20	12.20	32.50%	25.71%	57.14%	4.60	2.60	2.40	0.40
Chang Keng-Yu	5	26:45	11.8	37.50%	44.44%	78.57%	3.80	1.20	0.80	0.00
Chen Kuan-Chuan	5	27:21	7.20	42.31%	28.57%	80.00%	3.60	1.20	0.20	0.40
Kadeem Jack	Did not play									
Quincy Davis	5	20:33	10.60	50.00%	15.38%	45.45%	10.20	1.60	0.20	1.80
Peng Chun-Yen	4	10:09	2.50	28.57%	20.00%	0.00%	0.25	1.00	1.50	0.00

- Reference：

== Transactions ==
=== From Taoyuan Pauian Archiland ===
Player	Ref.
Kuan Ta-You	
Lin Yao-Tsung	
Shih Chin-Yao	
Chen Kuan-Chuan	
Peng Chun-Yen	

=== Free Agency ===
==== Additions ====
Date	Player	Contract terms	Former teams	Ref.
October 15, 2020	Sun Szu-Yao	—N/a	(United States) NYIT Bears	
October 20, 2020	Quincy Davis	—N/a	Taoyuan Pauian Archiland	
November 1, 2020	Lin Cheng	—N/a	NTSU	
November 11, 2020	Chen Ching-Huan	—N/a	Kaohsiung Jeoutai Technology	
November 11, 2020	Chen Shih-Chieh	—N/a	Taoyuan Pauian Archiland	
November 11, 2020	Chang Keng-Yu	—N/a	Formosa Dreamers	
November 19, 2020	Davon Reed	—N/a	(United States) Sioux Falls Skyforce	
November 19, 2020	Kadeem Jack	—N/a	(United States) Oklahoma City Blue	
November 24, 2020	Willie Warren	—N/a	(Mexico) Mineros de Zacatecas	
December 20, 2020	Lai Kuo-Wei	—N/a	Taiwan Beer	
March 1, 2021	Ting Sheng-Ju	—N/a	(United States) USF Fighting Saints	
March 1, 2021	Jordan Chatman	—N/a	(Romania) CSU Sibiu	

==== Subtractions ====
Date	Player	Reason	New Team	Ref.
January 29, 2021	Willie Warren	contract terminated	(Qatar) Al Shamal	

== Awards ==
=== End-of-Season Awards ===
Recipient	Award	Ref.
Shih Chin-Yao	All-PLG Team	

=== Players of the Month ===
Recipient	Award	Month awarded	Ref.
Shih Chin-Yao	April Most Valuable Player	April	

=== Players of the Week ===
Week	Recipient	Date awarded	Ref.
Preseason	Lin Yao-Tsung; Shih Chin-Yao	October 7 - November 22	
Week 1	Shih Chin-Yao; Davon Reed	December 19 - December 20	
Week 2	Quincy Davis	December 26 - December 27	
Week 3	Shih Chin-Yao	January 2 - January 3	
Week 5	Shih Chin-Yao	January 16 - January 17	
Week 6	Quincy Davis; Davon Reed	January 23 - January 24	
Week 7	Quincy Davis	January 30 - January 31	
Week 8	Chang Keng-Yu	February 6 - February 7	
Week 9	Kuan Ta-You	February 20 - February 21	
Week 10	Kuan Ta-You	February 27 - March 1	
Week 12	Lin Yao-Tsung	March 13 - March 14	
Week 13	Shih Chin-Yao	March 20 - March 21	
Week 14	Shih Chin-Yao	March 27 - March 28	
Week 15	Shih Chin-Yao	April 3 - April 5	
