= Hsinchu Toplus Lioneers all-time roster =

The following is a list of players, both past and current, who appeared at least in one game for the Hsinchu Toplus Lioneers (2023–present) or Hsinchu JKO Lioneers (2020–2023) franchise.

== Players ==
Note: Statistics are correct through the end of the 2025–26 TPBL season.

G	Guard	PG	Point guard	SG	Shooting guard	G/F	Guard-forward	F	Forward	SF	Small forward	PF	Power forward	F/C	Forward-center	C	Center

^{x}	Denotes player who is currently on the Hsinchu Toplus Lioneers roster
0.0	Denotes the Hsinchu Toplus Lioneers statistics leader (min. 40 games played for the team for per-game statistics)
player	Denotes player who has played for the Hsinchu Toplus Lioneers in the PLG

=== A ===
Player	Name	Nat.	Pos.	From	Yrs	Seasons	Statistics									Ref.
Player	Name	Nat.	Pos.	From	Yrs	Seasons	GP	MP	PTS	REB	AST	MPG	PPG	RPG	APG	Ref.
Justin Alston^{x}	奧獅頓	(United States)	C	Boston University	1	2026–present	0	0:00	0	0	0	0:00	0.0	0.0	0.0	
Will Artino	阿提諾	(United States) (Taiwan)	C	Creighton	2	2022–2024	31	1130:39	598	460	96	36:28	19.3	14.8	3.1	

=== B ===
Player	Name	Nat.	Pos.	From	Yrs	Seasons	Statistics									Ref.
Player	Name	Nat.	Pos.	From	Yrs	Seasons	GP	MP	PTS	REB	AST	MPG	PPG	RPG	APG	Ref.
Anthony Bennett	班尼特	(Canada)	F	UNLV	1	2022–2023	17	675:09	384	208	49	39:43	22.6	12.2	2.9	
Sim Bhullar^{x}	辛巴	(Canada)	C	New Mexico State	4	2021–2023; 2025–present	34	1297:40	836	661	68	38:10	24.6	19.4	2.0	
Karl Breuer^{x}	梁瀚	(Taiwan) (Germany)	PF	NTUA	1	2025–present	4	8:13	3	0	0	2:03	0.8	0.0	0.0	
Mike Bruesewitz	布魯斯巫獅	(United States)	F	Wisconsin	1	2021–2022	3	110:14	61	39	6	36:45	20.3	13.0	2.0	

=== C ===
Player	Name	Nat.	Pos.	From	Yrs	Seasons	Statistics									Ref.
Player	Name	Nat.	Pos.	From	Yrs	Seasons	GP	MP	PTS	REB	AST	MPG	PPG	RPG	APG	Ref.
Chen Li-Sheng^{x}	陳力生	(Taiwan)	PG	NTSU	1	2026–present	0	0:00	0	0	0	0:00	0.0	0.0	0.0	
Chen Tse-Yu	陳則語	(Taiwan)	G	NTUA	1	2022–2023	4	21:23	9	1	2	5:21	2.3	0.3	0.5	
Cheng Wei	鄭瑋	(Taiwan)	G	USC	1	2020–2021	15	201:33	56	11	21	13:26	3.7	0.7	1.4	
Benjamin Cheung^{x}	張庭瑋	(United States) (Taiwan)	F	Occidental	1	2026–present	0	0:00	0	0	0	0:00	0.0	0.0	0.0	
Chiang Kuang-Chien	姜廣謙	(Taiwan)	G	NTUA	3	2022–2025	29	222:46	50	11	10	7:40	1.7	0.4	0.3	
Chieng Li-Huan	成力煥	(Taiwan) (United States)	F	NCTU	1	2020–2021	24	715:14	318	99	55	29:48	13.3	4.1	2.3	
Chou Po-Hsun	周伯勳	(Taiwan)	F	MDU	2	2023–2025	51	605:08	88	109	24	11:51	1.7	2.1	0.5	
Chu Yun-Hao^{x}	朱雲豪	(Taiwan)	SF	UCH	6	2021–present	140	2830:14	884	290	143	20:12	6.3	2.1	1.0	
Earl Clark	克拉	(United States)	F	Louisville	2	2023–2025	53	1831:34	888	528	98	34:33	16.8	10.0	1.8	

=== D ===
Player	Name	Nat.	Pos.	From	Yrs	Seasons	Statistics									Ref.
Player	Name	Nat.	Pos.	From	Yrs	Seasons	GP	MP	PTS	REB	AST	MPG	PPG	RPG	APG	Ref.
Deyonta Davis	狄帝	(United States)	C	Michigan State	1	2023–2024	22	624:19	290	242	21	28:23	13.2	11.0	1.0	
Branden Dawson	大勝	(United States)	F	Michigan State	2	2020–2022	14	468:35	266	181	41	33:28	19.0	12.9	2.9	
Cheick Diallo^{x}	迪亞洛	(Mali)	C	Kansas	1	2026–present	0	0:00	0	0	0	0:00	0.0	0.0	0.0	

=== E ===
Player	Name	Nat.	Pos.	From	Yrs	Seasons	Statistics									Ref.
Player	Name	Nat.	Pos.	From	Yrs	Seasons	GP	MP	PTS	REB	AST	MPG	PPG	RPG	APG	Ref.
Ifeanyi Eboka	伊波卡	(Nigeria)	F	SHU	1	2022–2023	36	572:55	190	162	21	15:55	5.3	4.5	0.6	
Michael Efevberha	艾夫伯	(Nigeria) (United States)	G	Cal State Northridge	1	2023–2024	31	1103:01	714	247	113	35:35	23.0	8.0	3.6	

=== F ===
Player	Name	Nat.	Pos.	From	Yrs	Seasons	Statistics									Ref.
Player	Name	Nat.	Pos.	From	Yrs	Seasons	GP	MP	PTS	REB	AST	MPG	PPG	RPG	APG	Ref.
Nick Faust	法獅	(United States)	G/F	Long Beach State	1	2021–2022	23	795:01	571	226	68	34:34	24.8	9.8	3.0	
Fu Yu^{x}	傅友	(Taiwan)	SG	West Virginia Tech	1	2026–present	0	0:00	0	0	0	0:00	0.0	0.0	0.0	

=== G ===
Player	Name	Nat.	Pos.	From	Yrs	Seasons	Statistics									Ref.
Player	Name	Nat.	Pos.	From	Yrs	Seasons	GP	MP	PTS	REB	AST	MPG	PPG	RPG	APG	Ref.
Julian Gamble	敢搏	(United States)	C	Miami	1	2024–2025	2	44:21	12	14	1	22:10	6.0	7.0	0.5	

=== H ===
Player	Name	Nat.	Pos.	From	Yrs	Seasons	Statistics									Ref.
Player	Name	Nat.	Pos.	From	Yrs	Seasons	GP	MP	PTS	REB	AST	MPG	PPG	RPG	APG	Ref.
LaDontae Henton	狠投	(United States)	F	Providence	1	2020–2021	10	376:49	263	82	24	37:41	26.3	8.2	2.4	
Michael Holyfield	霍立飛	(United States)	C	Sam Houston State	2	2023–2025	39	873:36	387	413	25	22:24	9.9	10.6	0.6	
TJ Holyfield	提傑	(United States)	F	Texas Tech	1	2025–2026	32	967:39	349	251	65	30:14	10.9	7.8	2.0	
Hsiao Shun-Yi	蕭順議	(Taiwan)	F	NTUA	6	2020–2026	153	2710:06	860	391	132	17:42	5.6	2.6	0.9	

=== I ===
Player	Name	Nat.	Pos.	From	Yrs	Seasons	Statistics									Ref.
Player	Name	Nat.	Pos.	From	Yrs	Seasons	GP	MP	PTS	REB	AST	MPG	PPG	RPG	APG	Ref.
Iong Ngai-San	容毅燊	(Macau)	C	NTNU	3	2020–2022; 2024–2025	47	315:30	79	56	8	6:42	1.7	1.2	0.2	

=== K ===
Player	Name	Nat.	Pos.	From	Yrs	Seasons	Statistics									Ref.
Player	Name	Nat.	Pos.	From	Yrs	Seasons	GP	MP	PTS	REB	AST	MPG	PPG	RPG	APG	Ref.
Kao Kuo-Hao	高國豪	(Taiwan)	G	Southeast Missouri State	6	2020–2026	171	5492:33	2213	677	720	32:07	12.9	4.0	4.2	
Kuo Shao-Chieh	郭少傑	(Taiwan)	F	TNU	2	2021–2023	64	911:29	289	96	38	14:15	4.5	1.5	0.6	

=== L ===
Player	Name	Nat.	Pos.	From	Yrs	Seasons	Statistics									Ref.
Player	Name	Nat.	Pos.	From	Yrs	Seasons	GP	MP	PTS	REB	AST	MPG	PPG	RPG	APG	Ref.
Nate Laszewski	薛斯基	(United States)	F	Notre Dame	1	2024–2025	15	451:20	191	124	21	30:05	12.7	8.3	1.4	
Lee Chi-Wei	李啟瑋	(Taiwan)	SF	MDU	2	2024–2026	58	1091:36	223	101	59	18:49	3.8	1.7	1.0	
Lee Chia-Jui	李家瑞	(Taiwan)	F	KLCIVS	6	2020–2026	129	2055:22	593	366	137	15:55	4.6	2.8	1.1	
Li Han-Sheng	李漢昇	(Taiwan)	G	NTNU	2	2024–2026	36	695:31	193	74	97	19:19	5.4	2.1	2.7	
Lin Li-Jen	林力仁	(Taiwan)	G	MDU	1	2020–2021	7	50:36	11	4	2	7:14	1.6	0.6	0.3	
Lin Ming-Yi	林明毅	(Taiwan)	G	MDU	3	2020–2023	40	601:41	102	79	75	15:03	2.6	2.0	1.9	
Lin Yi-Huei	林宜輝	(Taiwan)	F	NTNU	2	2021–2023	33	831:13	253	96	82	25:11	7.7	2.9	2.5	
Liu Cheng-Hsun^{x}	劉丞勳	(Taiwan)	SG	UCH	2	2025–present	36	915:38	291	124	58	25:26	8.1	3.4	1.6	
Liu Kuang-Shang	劉光尚	(Taiwan)	F	FJU	1	2023–2024	1	8:48	2	2	1	8:48	2.0	2.0	1.0	
Lu Che-Yi	盧哲毅	(Taiwan)	G	ISU	1	2020–2021	1	0:51	0	0	0	0:51	0.0	0.0	0.0	
Lu Chi-Min	呂奇旻	(Taiwan)	G	NTUS	2	2022–2024	35	325:36	53	35	24	9:18	1.5	1.0	0.7	
Lu Kuan-Hsuan^{x}	盧冠軒	(Taiwan)	SG	NTNU	4	2023–present	102	2315:59	735	165	183	22:42	7.2	1.6	1.8	

=== M ===
Player	Name	Nat.	Pos.	From	Yrs	Seasons	Statistics									Ref.
Player	Name	Nat.	Pos.	From	Yrs	Seasons	GP	MP	PTS	REB	AST	MPG	PPG	RPG	APG	Ref.
Marin Marić	馬力	(Croatia)	C	DePaul	1	2025–2026	14	414:18	229	165	32	29:35	16.4	11.8	2.3	
Ivan Marinković	伊凡	(Serbia)	C	Serbia	1	2023–2024	3	72:29	22	24	2	24:10	7.3	8.0	0.7	
Jamarcus Mearidy	張傑瑋	(United States)	G	VNU	1	2023–2024	23	247:48	107	58	41	10:46	4.7	2.5	1.8	
Kennedy Meeks	米克獅	(United States)	F	North Carolina	1	2024–2025	31	872:46	448	373	47	28:09	14.5	12.0	1.5	

=== N ===
Player	Name	Nat.	Pos.	From	Yrs	Seasons	Statistics									Ref.
Player	Name	Nat.	Pos.	From	Yrs	Seasons	GP	MP	PTS	REB	AST	MPG	PPG	RPG	APG	Ref.
Landers Nolley	努利	(United States)	F	Cincinnati	1	2024–2025	21	804:37	611	172	125	38:18	29.1	8.2	6.0	

=== O ===
Player	Name	Nat.	Pos.	From	Yrs	Seasons	Statistics									Ref.
Player	Name	Nat.	Pos.	From	Yrs	Seasons	GP	MP	PTS	REB	AST	MPG	PPG	RPG	APG	Ref.
Daniel Ochefu	歐獅傅	(Nigeria) (United States)	C	Villanova	1	2023–2024	1	25:20	4	7	1	25:20	4.0	7.0	1.0	

=== P ===
Player	Name	Nat.	Pos.	From	Yrs	Seasons	Statistics									Ref.
Player	Name	Nat.	Pos.	From	Yrs	Seasons	GP	MP	PTS	REB	AST	MPG	PPG	RPG	APG	Ref.
Pan Kuan-Han	潘冠翰	(Taiwan)	F	NKNU	1	2020–2021	13	173:57	32	26	8	13:23	2.5	2.0	0.6	
Anžejs Pasečņiks	帕塞獅	(Latvia)	C	Latvia	1	2025–2026	20	581:47	236	155	34	29:05	11.8	7.8	1.7	
Drew Pember^{x}	德魯	(United States)	PF/C	UNC Asheville	2	2025–present	34	1203:53	639	391	100	35:24	18.8	11.5	2.9	

=== R ===
Player	Name	Nat.	Pos.	From	Yrs	Seasons	Statistics									Ref.
Player	Name	Nat.	Pos.	From	Yrs	Seasons	GP	MP	PTS	REB	AST	MPG	PPG	RPG	APG	Ref.
Matej Radunič	力契	(Croatia)	C	Croatia	1	2024–2025	1	25:49	12	10	3	25:49	12.0	10.0	3.0	

=== S ===
Player	Name	Nat.	Pos.	From	Yrs	Seasons	Statistics									Ref.
Player	Name	Nat.	Pos.	From	Yrs	Seasons	GP	MP	PTS	REB	AST	MPG	PPG	RPG	APG	Ref.
Shih Yen-Tsung	施顏宗	(Taiwan)	F	ISU	1	2023–2024	27	296:13	65	54	16	10:58	2.4	2.0	0.6	
Su Yi-Chin^{x}	蘇奕晉	(Taiwan)	PF	MDU	1	2026–present	0	0:00	0	0	0	0:00	0.0	0.0	0.0	
Sung Yu-Hsuan	宋宇軒	(Taiwan)	G	CCU	4	2020–2024	51	475:15	199	48	32	9:19	3.9	0.9	0.6	
Craig Sword	克雷格	(United States)	G	Mississippi State	1	2025–2026	6	142:54	103	28	12	23:49	17.2	4.7	2.0	

=== T ===
Player	Name	Nat.	Pos.	From	Yrs	Seasons	Statistics									Ref.
Player	Name	Nat.	Pos.	From	Yrs	Seasons	GP	MP	PTS	REB	AST	MPG	PPG	RPG	APG	Ref.
Elliot Tan	陳堅恩	(United States) (Taiwan)	G	Biola	2	2020–2022	42	818:33	278	101	60	19:29	6.6	2.4	1.4	
Hasheem Thabeet	塔壁	(Tanzania)	C	Connecticut	1	2020–2021	19	745:46	346	271	27	39:15	18.2	14.3	1.4	
Tien Hao	田浩	(Taiwan)	G	NCCU	6	2020–2026	128	2005:00	543	189	331	15:39	4.2	1.5	2.6	
Tsai Cheng-Kang^{x}	蔡宸綱	(Taiwan)	PF	UCH	3	2024–present	62	978:07	322	142	65	15:46	5.2	2.3	1.0	
Tsai Chien-Yu	蔡建宇	(Taiwan)	F	CKU	1	2020–2021	2	5:43	7	2	0	2:51	3.5	1.0	0.0	
Jade Tse^{x}	徐小龍	(United States) (Taiwan)	PG	Queens	1	2025–present	14	164:39	62	18	22	11:45	4.4	1.3	1.6	
Tseng Po-Yu^{x}	曾柏喻	(Taiwan)	PG	MDU	5	2022–present	130	2999:17	886	280	402	23:04	6.8	2.2	3.1	
Dar Tucker	達爾	(United States) (Jordan)	G	DePaul	1	2024–2025	4	88:09	56	22	8	22:02	14.0	5.5	2.0	
Jeremy Tyler	太樂	(United States)	C	SDHS	1	2022–2023	11	347:22	193	118	17	31:35	17.5	10.7	1.5	

=== W ===
Player	Name	Nat.	Pos.	From	Yrs	Seasons	Statistics									Ref.
Player	Name	Nat.	Pos.	From	Yrs	Seasons	GP	MP	PTS	REB	AST	MPG	PPG	RPG	APG	Ref.
Wang Lu-Hsiang^{x}	王律翔	(Taiwan)	SG	CCUT	1	2026–present	0	0:00	0	0	0	0:00	0.0	0.0	0.0	
Wang Tzu-Kang	王子綱	(Taiwan)	G	NKNU	2	2023–2025	35	305:47	100	33	13	8:44	2.9	0.9	0.4	
Terrico White	特壞	(United States)	G	Mississippi	1	2022–2023	18	738:31	367	126	66	41:02	20.4	7.0	3.7	
Julian Wright	雷特	(United States)	F/C	Kansas	1	2020–2021	11	368:27	160	126	45	33:30	14.5	11.5	4.1	
Wu Tai-Hao	吳岱豪	(Taiwan)	F	NTNU	2	2020–2022	46	481:18	90	76	36	10:28	2.0	1.7	0.8	
