= 2020–21 Hsinchu JKO Lioneers season =

Taiwanese professional basketball season

Hsinchu JKO Lioneers
2020-21 season
- President: Hu Lung-Chih
- General Manager: Kenny Kao
- Head Coach: Lin Kuan-Lun
- Arena: Hsinchu County Stadium
- P. League+: 9-15(.375)
- Playoffs: Did not qualify
- Scoring leader: LaDontae Henton(26.30)
- Rebounding leader: Hasheem Thabeet(14.26)
- Assists leader: Kao Kuo-Hao(4.36)
- Highest home attendance: 8,168 (January 23, 2021)
- Lowest home attendance: 5,103 (February 27, 2021)
- Average home attendance: 6,317(regular season)
- Biggest win: Lioneers 132-88 Pilots (March 28, 2021)
- Biggest defeat: Lioneers 82-111 Pilots (February 6, 2021)
- All statistics correct as of November 8, 2021.

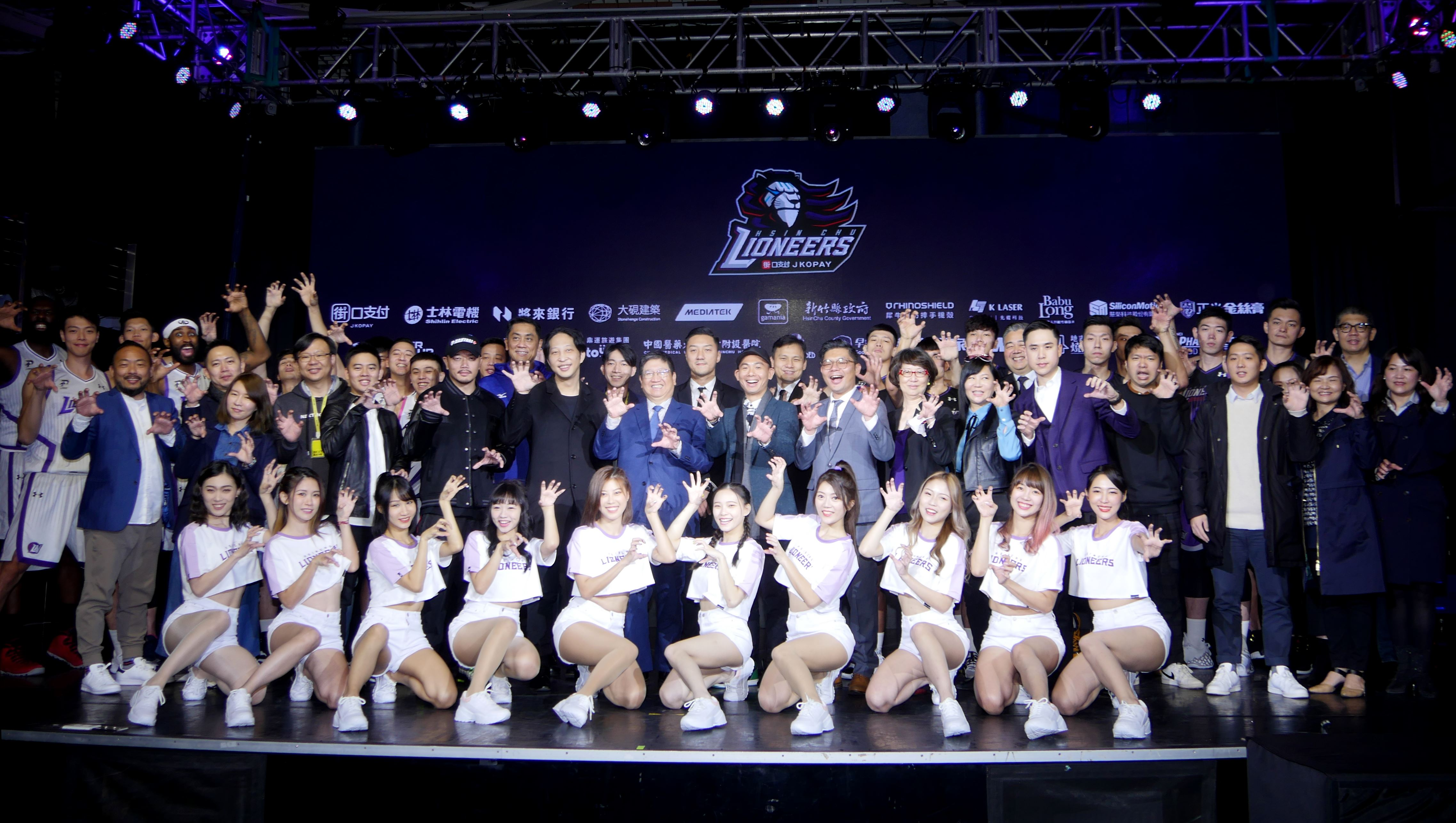

The 2020–21 Hsinchu JKO Lioneers season was the first season of the franchise in the P. LEAGUE+ (PLG), its 1st in the Hsinchu County and playing home games at Hsinchu County Stadium. The Lioneers are coached by Lin Kuan-Lun in his first year as head coach

== Preseason ==
On September 9, 2020, former Taiwanese professional basketball player Blackie Chen announcing the establishment of P. LEAGUE+ (PLG). The first game of PLG was started on December 19, 2020.

== Draft ==
The P. LEAGUE+ (PLG) did not hold a draft in its first season.

== Standings ==
Team	GP	W	L	PCT
z – Taipei Fubon Braves	24	19	5	.792
x – Taoyuan Pilots	24	10	14	.417
x – Formosa Taishin Dreamers	24	10	14	.417
Hsinchu JKO Lioneers	24	9	15	.375

== Roster ==
Note: Flags indicate national team eligibility at FIBA-sanctioned events. Players may hold other non-FIBA nationalities not displayed.

2020–21 Hsinchu JKO Lioneers roster
Players
Coaches

Pos.	No.	Nat.	Name	Ht.	Wt.	DOB (YYYY-MM-DD)	From
F	1	(Chinese Taipei)	Hsiao Hsun-Yi	1.92 m (6 ft 4 in)	82 kg (181 lb)	32 – 23 October 1992	NTUA
G	2	(Chinese Taipei)	Cheng Wei	1.80 m (5 ft 11 in)	88 kg (194 lb)	34 – 8 January 1991	USC
G	3	(Chinese Taipei)	Lin Ming-Yi	1.75 m (5 ft 9 in)	68 kg (150 lb)	28 – 27 March 1996	MingDao
G	4	(Chinese Taipei)	Kao Kuo-Hao	1.79 m (5 ft 10 in)	76 kg (168 lb)	26 – 22 September 1998	Southeast Missouri State
G	5	(Chinese Taipei)	Sung Yu-Hsuan	1.84 m (6 ft 0 in)	80 kg (176 lb)	35 – 5 December 1989	Chinese Culture
G	6	(United States) (Chinese Taipei)	Elliot Tan	1.78 m (5 ft 10 in)	78 kg (172 lb)	36 – 4 October 1988	Biola
G	7	(Chinese Taipei)	Lin Li-Jen	1.84 m (6 ft 0 in)	86 kg (190 lb)	34 – 16 June 1990	MingDao
F	11	(Chinese Taipei)	Pan Kuan-Han	1.96 m (6 ft 5 in)	94 kg (207 lb)	35 – 19 June 1989	NKNU
F	12	(Chinese Taipei)	Lee Chia-Jui	2.00 m (6 ft 7 in)	86 kg (190 lb)	30 – 4 December 1994	KLCIVS
G	13	(Chinese Taipei)	Tsai Chien-Yu	1.87 m (6 ft 2 in)	97 kg (214 lb)	28 – 19 September 1996	CKU
G	14	(Chinese Taipei)	Tien Hao	1.73 m (5 ft 8 in)	68 kg (150 lb)	26 – 16 September 1998	NCCU
G	15	(Chinese Taipei)	Lu Che-Yi	1.87 m (6 ft 2 in)	77 kg (170 lb)	31 – 15 July 1993	I-Shou
G	21	(Chinese Taipei) (United States)	Chieng Li-Huan	1.90 m (6 ft 3 in)	88 kg (194 lb)	37 – 5 March 1988	NCTU
G	22	(United States)	Branden Dawson (I)	2.00 m (6 ft 7 in)	104 kg (229 lb)	32 – 1 February 1993	Michigan State
G	23	(United States)	LaDontae Henton (I)	1.98 m (6 ft 6 in)	98 kg (216 lb)	33 – 6 January 1992	Providence
C	34	(Tanzania)	Hasheem Thabeet (I)	2.21 m (7 ft 3 in)	118 kg (260 lb)	38 – 16 February 1987	Connecticut
G	52	(Macau)	Iong Ngai-San	2.00 m (6 ft 7 in)	110 kg (243 lb)	29 – 9 February 1996	NTNU
F	54	(Chinese Taipei)	Wu Tai-Hao (C)	2.00 m (6 ft 7 in)	108 kg (238 lb)	40 – 7 February 1985	BYU–Hawaii

Head coach

- (Chinese Taipei) Lin Kuan-Lun

Assistant coach(es)

- (Chinese Taipei) Seng Hsin-Han

Athletic trainer(s)

- (Chinese Taipei) Huang Chien-Yuan

Legend

- (C) Team captain
- (I) Import player
- Injured

== Game log ==
=== Preseason ===
2020 preseason game log Total:3-3 (Home:3-0, Road:0-3)
Game	Date	Team	Score	High points	High rebounds	High assists	Location attendance	Record
1	October 17	Formosa Dreamers	W 87-80	Kao Kuo-Hao (30)	Chieng Li-Huan (16)	Chieng Li-Huan (4)	Hsinchu County Stadium	1-0
2	October 18	@Taipei Fubon Braves	L 81-93	Kao Kuo-Hao (16); Chieng Li-Huan (16)	Lee Chia-Jui (7)	Lee Chia-Jui (2); Chieng Li-Huan (4); Pan Kuan-Han (4)	Hsinchu County Stadium	1-1
3	November 7	@Formosa Dreamers	L 104-122	Chieng Li-Huan (17)	Kao Kuo-Hao (7)	Chieng Li-Huan (3); Elliot Tan (3)	Taipei Heping Basketball Gymnasium	1-2
4	November 8	Taoyuan Pilots	W 92-87	Chieng Li-Huan (23)	Lee Chia-Jui (6)	Tien Hao (5); Kao Kuo-Hao (5)	Taipei Heping Basketball Gymnasium	2-2
5	November 21	@Taipei Fubon Braves	L 71-107	Chieng Li-Huan (11)	Lee Chia-Jui (5)	Kao Kuo-Hao (3)	National Taiwan University of Sport Gymnasium	2-3
6	November 22	Taoyuan Pilots	W 96-87	Chieng Li-Huan (26)	Lee Chia-Jui (15)	Kao Kuo-Hao (9)	National Taiwan University of Sport Gymnasium	3-3

=== Regular season ===
2020–21 regular season game log Total: 9-15 (Home: 5-7, Road: 4-8)
Game	Date	Team	Score	High points	High rebounds	High assists	Location attendance	Record
1	December 26	Taoyuan Pilots	W 97-91	Chieng Li-Huan (24)	Lee Chia-Jui (11)	Kao Kuo-Hao (5)	Hsinchu County Stadium; 6,688	1-0
2	December 27	Taipei Fubon Braves	L 87-96	LaDontae Henton (23)	Julian Wright (12)	Kao Kuo-Hao (7)	Hsinchu County Stadium; 7,236	1-1
3	January 3	@Taipei Fubon Braves	L 86-96	Kao Kuo-Hao (19)	Julian Wright (13)	Kao Kuo-Hao (5)	Taipei Heping Basketball Gymnasium; 7,000	1-2
4	January 9	Formosa Taishin Dreamers	L 87-95	LaDontae Henton (35)	LaDontae Henton (12)	Kao Kuo-Hao (9)	Hsinchu County Stadium; 5,798	1-3
5	January 10	Taipei Fubon Braves	L 98-105	LaDontae Henton (27)	Hasheem Thabeet (9)	Kao Kuo-Hao (7)	Hsinchu County Stadium; 6,377	1-4
6	January 16	@Taoyuan Pilots	L 91-106	LaDontae Henton (23)	Julian Wright (7)	Tien Hao (5)	Taoyuan Arena; 0	1-5
7	January 17	@Taipei Fubon Braves	W 111-102	LaDontae Henton (24)	Julian Wright (13)	Julian Wright (10)	Taipei Heping Basketball Gymnasium; 6,968	2-5
8	January 23	Taipei Fubon Braves	L 67-87	Hasheem Thabeet (15)	Julian Wright (17)	Julian Wright (4); Chieng Li-Huan (4)	Hsinchu County Stadium; 8,168	2-6
9	January 24	Formosa Taishin Dreamers	L 81-92	Chieng Li-Huan (17)	Julian Wright (12)	Julian Wright (4); Lee Chia-Jui (4)	Hsinchu County Stadium; 5,967	2-7
10	January 30	@Formosa Taishin Dreamers	L 92-103	Hasheem Thabeet (28)	Hasheem Thabeet (16)	Julian Wright (6)	Changhua County Stadium; 4,521	2-8
11	January 31	@Taoyuan Pilots	W 84-72	Julian Wright (26)	Hasheem Thabeet (15)	Lin Ming-Yi (4); Tien Hao (4)	Taoyuan Arena; 0	3-8
12	February 6	@Taoyuan Pilots	L 82-111	Hasheem Thabeet (17)	Julian Wright (10)	Cheng Wei (6)	Taoyuan Arena; 0	3-9
13	February 7	@Formosa Taishin Dreamers	L 85-96	Hasheem Thabeet (16)	Hasheem Thabeet (15)	Julian Wright (7)	Changhua County Stadium; 3,886	3-10
14	February 20	@Taoyuan Pilots	L 102-108	LaDontae Henton (30)	Hasheem Thabeet (12)	Kao Kuo-Hao (6)	Taoyuan Arena; 2,000	3-11
15	February 21	@Taipei Fubon Braves	L 97-106	Branden Dawson (21)	Hasheem Thabeet (20)	Kao Kuo-Hao (5)	Taipei Heping Basketball Gymnasium; 7,000	3-12
16	February 27	Taoyuan Pilots	L 98-106	LaDontae Henton (40)	Hasheem Thabeet (18)	Lin Ming-Yi (9)	Hsinchu County Stadium; 5,103	3-13
17	March 1	Taipei Fubon Braves	W 83-76	Kao Kuo-Hao (18)	Hasheem Thabeet (12)	Kao Kuo-Hao (4); Lin Ming-Yi (4)	Hsinchu County Stadium; 6,331	4-13
18	March 7	@Taipei Fubon Braves	L 105-109	Hasheem Thabeet (27)	Hasheem Thabeet (17)	Kao Kuo-Hao (7)	Taipei Heping Basketball Gymnasium; 7,000	4-14
19	March 13	Taoyuan Pilots	W 105-88	LaDontae Henton (29)	Hasheem Thabeet (15)	LaDontae Henton (7)	Hsinchu County Stadium; 5,188	5-14
20	March 14	Formosa Taishin Dreamers	W 112-105	Hasheem Thabeet (27)	Hasheem Thabeet (17)	Lin Ming-Yi (6); Kao Kuo-Hao (6)	Hsinchu County Stadium; 5,893	6-14
21	March 20	@Formosa Taishin Dreamers	W 99-87	Branden Dawson (23)	Hasheem Thabeet (19)	Lin Ming-Yi (5)	National Taiwan University of Sport Gymnasium; 4,000	7-14
22	March 27	Formosa Taishin Dreamers	L 91-99	Hasheem Thabeet (18)	Hasheem Thabeet (21)	Tien Hao (8)	Hsinchu County Stadium; 7,078	7-15
23	March 28	Taoyuan Pilots	W 132-82	Branden Dawson (32)	Branden Dawson (17)	Branden Dawson (10)	Hsinchu County Stadium; 5,978	8-15
24	April 4	@Formosa Taishin Dreamers	W 108-100	Hasheem Thabeet (37)	Hasheem Thabeet (16)	Chieng Li-Huan (9)	Changhua County Stadium; 6,000	9-15

==== Regular season note ====
- Due to the COVID-19 pandemic, the Taoyuan City Government and Taoyuan Pilots declared that the games in Taoyuan Arena would be played behind closed doors from January 16, 2021 to February 7, 2021.

== Player statistics ==
Legend
GP	Games played	MPG	Minutes per game	2P%	2-point field goal percentage
3P%	3-point field goal percentage	FT%	Free throw percentage	RPG	Rebounds per game
APG	Assists per game	SPG	Steals per game	BPG	Blocks per game
PPG	Points per game		Led the league

=== Regular season ===
Player	GP	MPG	PPG	2P%	3P%	FT%	RPG	APG	SPG	BPG
Hsiao Hsun-Yi	21	13:00	4.33	47.27%	29.41%	61.54%	1.71	0.81	0.38	0.05
Cheng Wei	15	13:26	3.73	48.00%	23.33%	68.75%	0.73	1.40	1.13	0.00
Lin Ming-Yi	17	17:40	3.94	22.58%	23.26%	88.46%	2.71	2.88	0.94	0.00
Kao Kuo-Hao	22	30:13	12.41	39.90%	28.40%	76.67%	4.95	4.36	2.55	0.05
Sung Yu-Hsuan	10	09:47	5.20	48.65%	40.00%	76.92%	0.80	1.00	0.30	0.10
Elliot Tan	17	19:47	7.82	42.86%	36.36%	70.00%	2.88	1.53	0.71	0.00
Lin Li-Jen	7	07:13	1.57	0.00%	18.75%	100.00%	0.57	0.29	0.00	0.00
Pan Kuan-Han	13	13:22	2.46	20.00%	23.81%	50.00%	2.00	0.62	0.62	0.15
Lee Chia-Jui	24	20:50	5.96	32.99%	26.09%	54.35%	3.92	1.63	0.33	0.38
Tsai Chien-Yu	2	02:51	3.50	50.00%	100.00%	50.00%	1.00	0.00	0.00	0.00
Tien Hao	19	17:35	4.84	42.00%	31.82%	40.00%	2.74	3.16	1.11	0.00
Lu Che-Yi	1	00:51	0.00	0.00%	0.00%	0.00%	0.00	0.00	0.00	0.00
Chieng Li-Huan	24	29:48	13.25	49.48%	28.74%	77.94%	4.13	2.29	0.79	1.29
Branden Dawson	7	33:49	21.14	55.36%	23.53%	54.55%	11.43	4.14	2.00	1.29
LaDontae Henton	10	37:40	26.30	45.79%	40.79%	81.82%	8.20	2.40	1.40	0.30
Julian Wright	11	33:29	14.55	43.75%	28.07%	58.33%	11.45	4.09	2.09	0.55
Hasheem Thabeet	19	39:15	18.21	60.85%	0.00%	56.05%	14.26	1.42	1.47	3.26
Iong Ngai-San	22	06:56	1.82	30.77%	20.00%	50.00%	1.59	0.18	0.32	0.36
Wu Tai-Hao	18	12:26	2.67	53.33%	20.00%	66.67%	1.89	1.17	0.28	0.39

- Reference：

== Transactions ==
=== Free Agency ===
==== Additions ====
Date	Player	Contract terms	Former teams	Ref.
August 3, 2020	Hsiao Shun-Yi	—	Taipei Fubon Braves	
August 3, 2020	Cheng Wei	—	Formosa Dreamers	
August 3, 2020	Sung Yu-Hsuan	—	(China) Henan Golden Elephants	
August 3, 2020	Elliot Tan	—	Taoyuan Pauian Archiland	
August 3, 2020	Lin Li-Jen	—	Yulon Luxgen Dinos	
August 3, 2020	Pan Kuan-Han	—	Yulon Luxgen Dinos	
August 3, 2020	Lee Chia-Jui	—	Jeoutai Technology	
August 3, 2020	Chieng Li-Huan	1+1-year contract, worth unknown	Taiwan Beer	
August 3, 2020	Iong Ngai-San	—	NTNU Master	
August 3, 2020	Wu Tai-Hao	—	Taoyuan Pauian Archiland	
September 1, 2020	Tien Hao	—	NCCU Griffins	
September 1, 2020	Lu Che-Yi	—	ISU	
September 1, 2020	Tsai Chien-Yu	—	CKIMH	
September 9, 2020	Kao Kuo-Hao	3-year contract, worth unknown	(United States) Southeast Missouri State Redhawks	
September 26, 2020	Hasheem Thabeet	—	(United States) Fort Wayne Mad Ants	
November 26, 2020	LaDontae Henton	—	(Israel) Maccabi Ashdod B.C.	
November 29, 2020	Julian Wright	—	(France) Metropolitans 92	
January 21, 2021	Lin Ming-Yi	—	(China) Hunan Jinjian Rice Industry	
February 15, 2021	Branden Dawson	—	Kaohsiung Jeoutai Technology	

==== Subtractions ====
Date	Player	Reason	New team	Ref.
February 14, 2020	Julian Wright	contract terminated (Note: On February 24, 2020，Wright signed with the Hsinchu JKO Lioneers of the P.League+ as player skills development coach.)	Taichung Wagor Suns	

== Awards ==
=== End-of-Season Awards ===
Recipient	Award	Ref.
Kao Kuo-Hao	Rookie of the Year	
Kao Kuo-Hao	All-Defensive Team	
Chieng Li-Huan	All-PLG Team	
Chieng Li-Huan	All-Defensive Team	
Hasheem Thabeet	Defensive Player of the Year	
Hasheem Thabeet	All-Defensive Team	
Hasheem Thabeet	Rebounds Leader	
Hasheem Thabeet	Blocks Leader	
Hsinchu JKO Lioneers	Best Home Court	

=== Players of the Month ===
Recipient	Award	Month awarded	Ref.
Hasheem Thabeet	March Most Valuable Player	March	

=== Players of the Week ===
Week	Recipient	Date awarded	Ref.
Preseason	Chieng Li-Huan; Kao Kuo-Hao	October 7 - November 22	
Week 2	Chieng Li-Huan	December 26 - December 27	
Week 3	Kao Kuo-Hao	January 2 - January 3	
Week 4	Kao Kuo-Hao	January 9 - January 10	
Week 5	Elliot Tan; Julian Wright	January 16 - January 17	
Week 6	Tien Hao	January 23 - January 24	
Week 7	Chieng Li-Huan	January 30 - January 31	
Week 8	Cheng Wei	February 6 - February 7	
Week 9	Kao Kuo-Hao	February 20 - February 21	
Week 10	Kao Kuo-Hao	February 27 - March 1	
Week 11	Kao Kuo-Hao	March 6 - March 7	
Week 12	Chieng Li-Huan; Hasheem Thabeet	March 13 - March 14	
Week 13	Chieng Li-Huan; Branden Dawson	March 20 - March 21	
Week 14	Tien Hao; Branden Dawson	March 27 - March 28	
Week 15	Tien Hao; Hasheem Thabeet	April 3 - April 5	
