= 2024–25 Taoyuan Pauian Pilots season =

Taiwanese professional basketball season

Taoyuan Pauian Pilots
2024–25 season
- President: Li Chung-Shu
- General Manager: Li Chung-Shu
- Head Coach: Iurgi Caminos
- Arena: Taoyuan Arena
- All statistics correct as of July 8, 2024.

The 2024–25 Taoyuan Pauian Pilots season was the franchise's 5th season, its fifth season in the P. League+ (PLG), its 5th in Taoyuan City. The Pilots is coached by Iurgi Caminos in his third year as head coach. The Pilots also participated in 2024–25 East Asia Super League as the 2024 PLG runner-up.

== Draft ==
Round	Pick	Player	Position	Status	School/club team
1	4	Chen Li-Sheng	G	Local	NTSU

== Roster ==
Note: Flags indicate national team eligibility at FIBA-sanctioned events. Players may hold other non-FIBA nationalities not displayed.

2024–25 Taoyuan Pauian Pilots roster
Players
Coaches

Pos.	No.	Nat.	Name	Ht.	Wt.	DOB (YYYY-MM-DD)	From
C	1	(Senegal)	Amdy Dieng (FS)	2.07 m (6 ft 9 in)	105 kg (231 lb)	27 – 1 August 1998	NCCU
G	2	(Taiwan)	Chen Yu-Jui	1.85 m (6 ft 1 in)	75 kg (165 lb)	29 – 22 December 1995	NTSU
G	3	(Taiwan)	Chen Li-Sheng	1.75 m (5 ft 9 in)	68 kg (150 lb)	22 – 16 September 2002	NTSU
G	6	(Taiwan)	Kuan Ta-You	1.81 m (5 ft 11 in)	89 kg (196 lb)	27 – 15 September 1997	NTSU
F	7	(Taiwan)	Chiao Chu-Yu	2.00 m (6 ft 7 in)	98 kg (216 lb)	24 – 28 September 2000	Fu Jen
G	10	(Taiwan)	Lin Tzu-Wei	1.88 m (6 ft 2 in)	82 kg (181 lb)	25 – 12 May 2000	NKNU
G	12	(Taiwan)	Li Chia-Kang	1.85 m (6 ft 1 in)	85 kg (187 lb)	26 – 16 October 1998	NTSU
C	21	(United States)	Alec Brown (I)	2.16 m (7 ft 1 in)	107 kg (236 lb)	33 – 23 July 1992	Green Bay
F	24	(United States)	Treveon Graham (I)	1.98 m (6 ft 6 in)	100 kg (220 lb)	31 – 28 October 1993	VCU
C	25	(Taiwan)	Lin Cheng	2.02 m (6 ft 8 in)	102 kg (225 lb)	25 – 25 July 2000	NTSU
G	30	(Taiwan)	Pai Yao-Cheng	1.84 m (6 ft 0 in)	72 kg (159 lb)	26 – 2 February 1999	I-Shou
F	42	(United States)	Julian Boyd (I)	2.01 m (6 ft 7 in)	104 kg (229 lb)	35 – 2 February 1990	LIU Brooklyn
F	45	(United States)	Jarrod Jones (I)	2.06 m (6 ft 9 in)	104 kg (229 lb)	35 – 27 May 1990	Ball State
G	69	(Taiwan)	Lu Chun-Hsiang	1.90 m (6 ft 3 in)	82 kg (181 lb)	28 – 15 July 1997	Fu Jen

Head coach

- (Spain) Iurgi Caminos

Assistant coach(es)

- (Taiwan) Chen Shih-Chieh
- (Taiwan) Huang Chi-Feng
- (Taiwan) Tang Wei-Jie
- (Taiwan) Yang I-Feng

Strength & conditioning coach(es)

- (Taiwan) Liu Hou-Shao
- (Taiwan) Liu Nien-Chieh

Athletic trainer(s)

- (Taiwan) Peng Li-Chen
- (Taiwan) Wu Yun-Kai

Legend

- (C) Team captain
- (I) Import player
- (FS) Foreign student player
- (HP) Heritage player
- (FA) Free agent
- (DP) Unsigned draft pick
- (AI) EASL Asian import
- (S) Suspended
- Injured

- Roster
Updated: September 11, 2024

== Game log ==
=== East Asia Super League ===
==== Group stage ====
October 23
19:10 UTC+9

Boxscore

Suwon KT Sonicboom (South Korea)	vs.	(Chinese Taipei) Taoyuan Pauian Pilots
Scoring by quarter: –, –, –, –

Suwon KT Sonicboom Arena, Suwon

November 13
18:10 UTC+8

Boxscore

San Miguel Beermen (Philippines)	vs.	(Chinese Taipei) Taoyuan Pauian Pilots
Scoring by quarter: –, –, –, –

PhilSports Arena, Pasig

December 11
19:10 UTC+8

Boxscore

Taoyuan Pauian Pilots (Chinese Taipei)	vs.	(South Korea) Suwon KT Sonicboom
Scoring by quarter: –, –, –, –

TBC

December 25
20:10 UTC+8

Boxscore

Taoyuan Pauian Pilots (Chinese Taipei)	vs.	(Japan) Hiroshima Dragonflies
Scoring by quarter: –, –, –, –

Taoyuan Arena, Taoyuan

January 22
19:10 UTC+9

Boxscore

Hiroshima Dragonflies (Japan)	vs.	(Chinese Taipei) Taoyuan Pauian Pilots
Scoring by quarter: –, –, –, –

F-Pico Arena, Fukuyama

February 5
19:10 UTC+8

Boxscore

Taoyuan Pauian Pilots (Chinese Taipei)	vs.	(Hong Kong) Eastern
Scoring by quarter: –, –, –, –

Taoyuan Arena, Taoyuan

=== Exhibition game ===
September 12
15:00 UTC+8

Taoyuan Pauian Pilots	119–101	Goyang Sono Skygunners

Hao Yu International Company, New Taipei

=== Preseason ===
2024 preseason game log
Total: 0–0 (Home: 0–0; Road: 0–0)
Preseason : 0–0 (Home: 0–0; Road: 0–0)

Game	Date	Team	Score	High points	High rebounds	High assists	Location Attendance	Record
1	October 12	@GhostHawks					NCKU Chung Cheng Gym	
2	October 13	Steelers					NCKU Chung Cheng Gym	

2024–25 schedule

== Transactions ==
=== Free agency ===
==== Re-signed ====
Date	Player	Contract terms	Ref.
July 4, 2024	Chen Yu-Jui	5-year contract, worth unknown	
July 4, 2024	Kuan Ta-Yu	5-year contract, worth unknown	
July 4, 2024	Lu Chun-Hsiang	5-year contract, worth unknown	
July 31, 2024	Alec Brown	—	
July 31, 2024	Treveon Graham	—	

==== Additions ====
Date	Player	Contract terms	Former team	Ref.
August 2, 2024	Chen Li-Sheng	—	NTSU	
August 14, 2024	Jarrod Jones	—	(Turkey) Türk Telekom	
August 28, 2024	Julian Boyd	—	Formosa Dreamers	

==== Subtractions ====
Date	Player	Reason	New team	Ref.
July 1, 2024	Chang Chen-Ya	contract expired	—	
July 1, 2024	Chen Yu-Han	contract expired	—	
July 30, 2024	Jason Washburn	contract expired	New Taipei Kings	
August 9, 2024	Lee Hsueh-Lin	contract expired	—	
September 9, 2024	Chou Yi-Hsiang	contract terminated	—	
October 1, 2024	Kennedy Meeks	contract expired	Hsinchu Toplus Lioneers	
