= LaDontae Henton =

American basketball player and coach (born 1992)

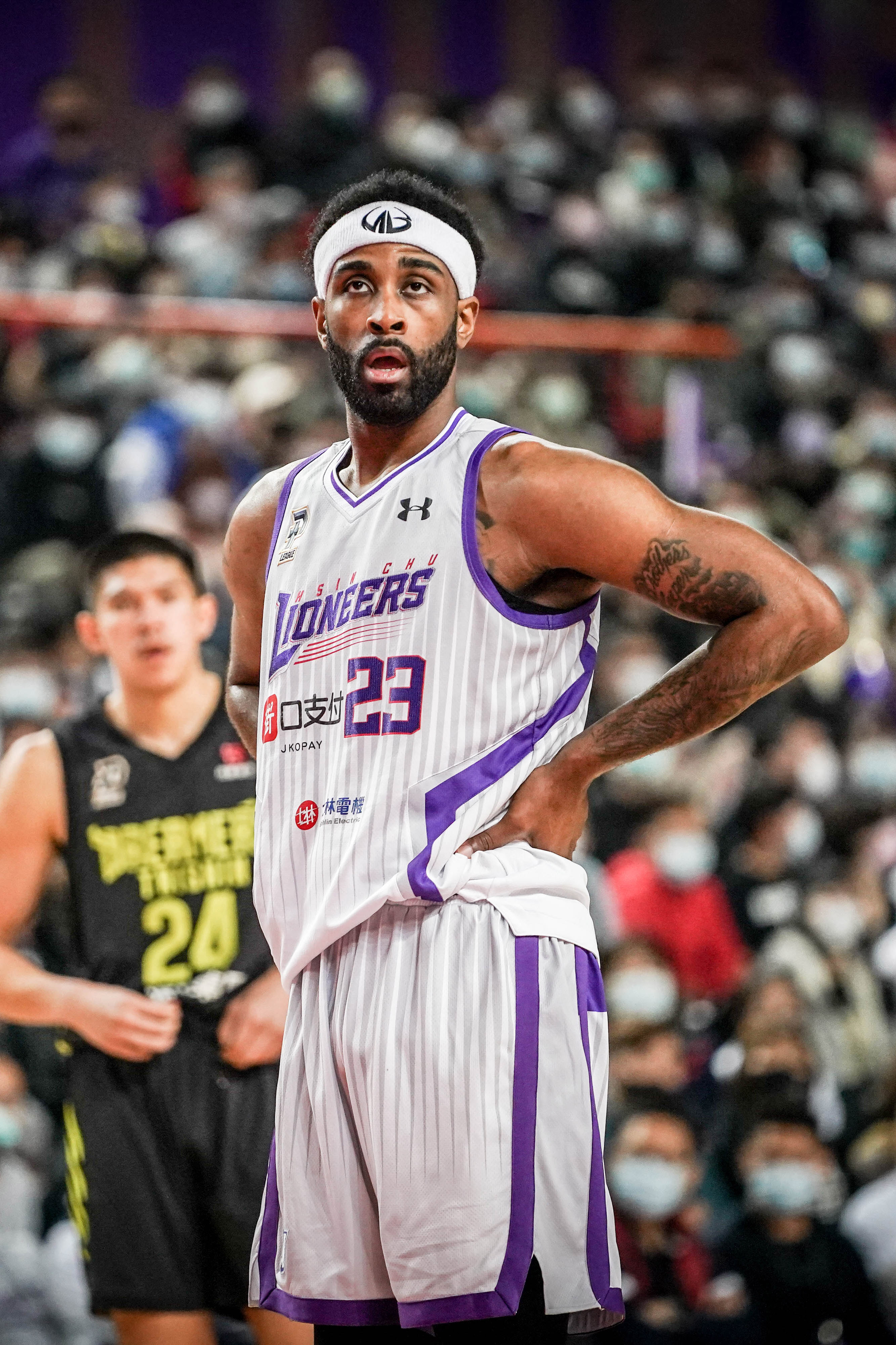
- Henton while playing professionally in Taiwan

Georgetown Hoyas
- Title: Assistant coach
- Conference: Big East Conference

Personal information
- Born: January 6, 1992 (age 34) Lansing, Michigan, U.S.
- Listed height: 6 ft 6 in (1.98 m)
- Listed weight: 215 lb (98 kg)

Career information
- High school: Eastern (Lansing, Michigan)
- College: Providence (2011–2015)
- NBA draft: 2015: undrafted
- Playing career: 2015–2021
- Position: Small forward
- Number: 7, 23
- Coaching career: 2021–present

Career history

Playing
- 2015–2016: Sevilla
- 2016: Alaska Aces
- 2016–2017: Santa Cruz Warriors
- 2017: Alaska Aces
- 2017–2018: Agua Caliente Clippers
- 2018: BC Andorra
- 2019: Atomerőmű SE
- 2019–2020: Maccabi Ashdod
- 2020–2021: Hsinchu JKO Lioneers

Coaching
- 2021–2023: Providence (assistant)
- 2023–present: Georgetown (assistant)

Career highlights
- AP Honorable mention All-American (2015); First-team All-Big East (2015); Big East All-Rookie team (2012)
- Stats at Basketball Reference

LaDontae Lee Henton (born January 6, 1992) is an American basketball coach and former player who is currently an assistant coach at Georgetown. He played college basketball for Providence before playing professionally in Spain, the Philippines, NBA G League, Hungary, and Israel.

== High school career ==
A 6'6" small forward, Henton went to Eastern High School in Lansing, Michigan, where he was a four-time first-team all-state player and averaged 22.2 points per game for his career. He left as the fourth best rebounder in Michigan prep history, averaging 14.5 rebounds per game.

== College career ==
Henton originally was set to attend Dayton, but after Dayton coach Brian Gregory left for Georgia Tech, he became new Providence coach Ed Cooley's first recruit. In his freshman season, Henton averaged 14.3 points and 8.6 rebounds per game and was named to the Big East Conference All-Rookie team.

As a senior, Henton enjoyed a breakout season. After leading the Big East in scoring at 19.7 points per game, he was named first-team All-conference and helped lead the Friars to their second consecutive NCAA tournament appearance for the first time since the 1988–89 and 1989–90 seasons. He was also named the USBWA District I Player of the Year and an honorable mention All-American by the Associated Press.

Henton finished his Friar career with 2,059 points and 1,054 rebounds, becoming the second player in school history to achieve the 2000/1000 milestone (Ryan Gomes was the first).

== Professional career ==
After going undrafted in the 2015 NBA draft, Henton joined the Golden State Warriors for the 2015 NBA Summer League. On August 21, 2015, he signed with Spanish League team CB Sevilla. In June 2016, he joined the Alaska Aces of the Philippine Basketball Association as the team's import for the 2016 PBA Governors' Cup. He led the Aces in the playoffs.

On October 30, 2016, Henton was selected by the Santa Cruz Warriors with the 10th overall pick in the 2016 NBA Development League Draft, however he was waived by the Warriors on November 10. On December 16, he was reacquired by Santa Cruz.

On September 27, 2017, Henton signed with Los Angeles Clippers as part of their training camp.

On November 5, 2018, Henton signed a one-month contract with BC Andorra.

On January 7, 2019, Henton signed with Atomerőmű SE for the rest of the season. In 20 games played for Atomerőmű, he averaged 14.6 points, 5.4 rebounds and 1.6 assists and 1.1 steals per game.

On July 28, 2019, Henton signed a one-year deal with Maccabi Ashdod of the Israeli Premier League.

On November 26, 2020, Henton signed with Hsinchu JKO Lioneers of the Taiwanese P. League+.

== Coaching career ==
On July 8, 2021, Henton was named to Ed Cooley's coaching staff at Providence as a special assistant to the head coach. When Cooley became the head coach at Georgetown in 2023, Henton joined his staff as an assistant coach and director of player development.

== See also ==
- List of NCAA Division I men's basketball players with 2000 points and 1000 rebounds
