= Jordan Chatman =

American basketball player (born 1993)

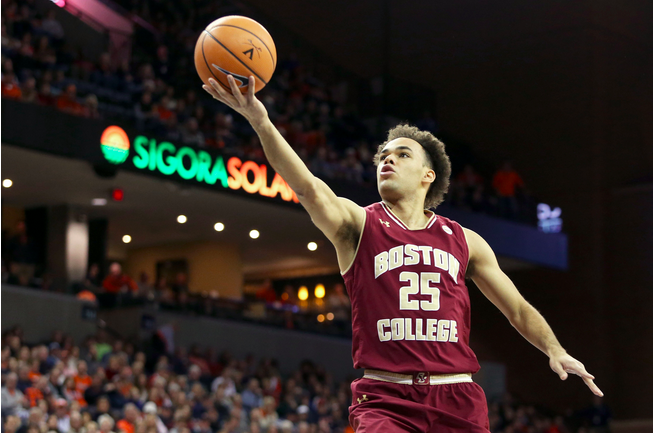
- Chatman lays the ball up vs Virginia

Personal information
- Born: May 21, 1993 (age 33)
- Listed height: 6 ft 5 in (1.96 m)
- Listed weight: 195 lb (88 kg)

Career information
- High school: Union (Camas, Washington)
- College: BYU (2015–2016); Boston College (2016–2019)
- NBA draft: 2019: undrafted
- Playing career: 2019–present
- Position: Shooting guard

Career history
- 2019–2020: Sibiu
- 2021: Taoyuan Pilots
- 2021–2022: Tainan TSG GhostHawks

Career highlights
- Washington Mr. Basketball (2012)

Jordan Reid Chatman (born May 21, 1993) is an American professional basketball player. Chatman played college basketball for Boston College Eagles and Brigham Young University and in high school was named Washington Mr. Basketball in 2012.

== High school career ==
Chatman grew up in Vancouver, Washington and attended Skyview High School before transferring to Union High School in 2010. As a senior in 2011–12, he averaged 20.7 points, 6.3 rebounds, 2.7 assists, and 1.9 steals per game, leading the team to a 21–8 record and third place finish in the state tournament. He averaged 27 points per game during the tournament run and hit a fullcourt shot as time expired in the state semifinals, earning tournament MVP honors. Chatman won the 2012 Washington Boys Basketball Gatorade Player of the Year award. He signed a national letter of intent to play at BYU. He chose BYU over scholarship offers from Washington State, Stanford, Oregon State, Boston College, Utah and Utah State.

== College career ==
After completing his missionary service, Chatman attended Brigham Young University and took a redshirt as a true freshman in the 2014–15 season to recover from an injury. As a redshirt freshman, Chatman averaged 2.6 points and 1.0 rebounds per game, shooting 18-of-53 from long range and helping BYU compile a 26–11 record and reach the NIT semifinals. On January 14, 2016, Chatman played big minutes, helping the Cougars beat the #25 ranked Gonzaga Bulldogs. After the season, Chatman decided to transfer and did not have to sit out a season since he graduated early from BYU. He was accepted into the BYU Law School but was no allowed to play basketball, so he transferred to play for the Boston College Eagles. Chatman chose Boston College after family friend Alex Kline recommended him to Eagles coach Jim Christian.

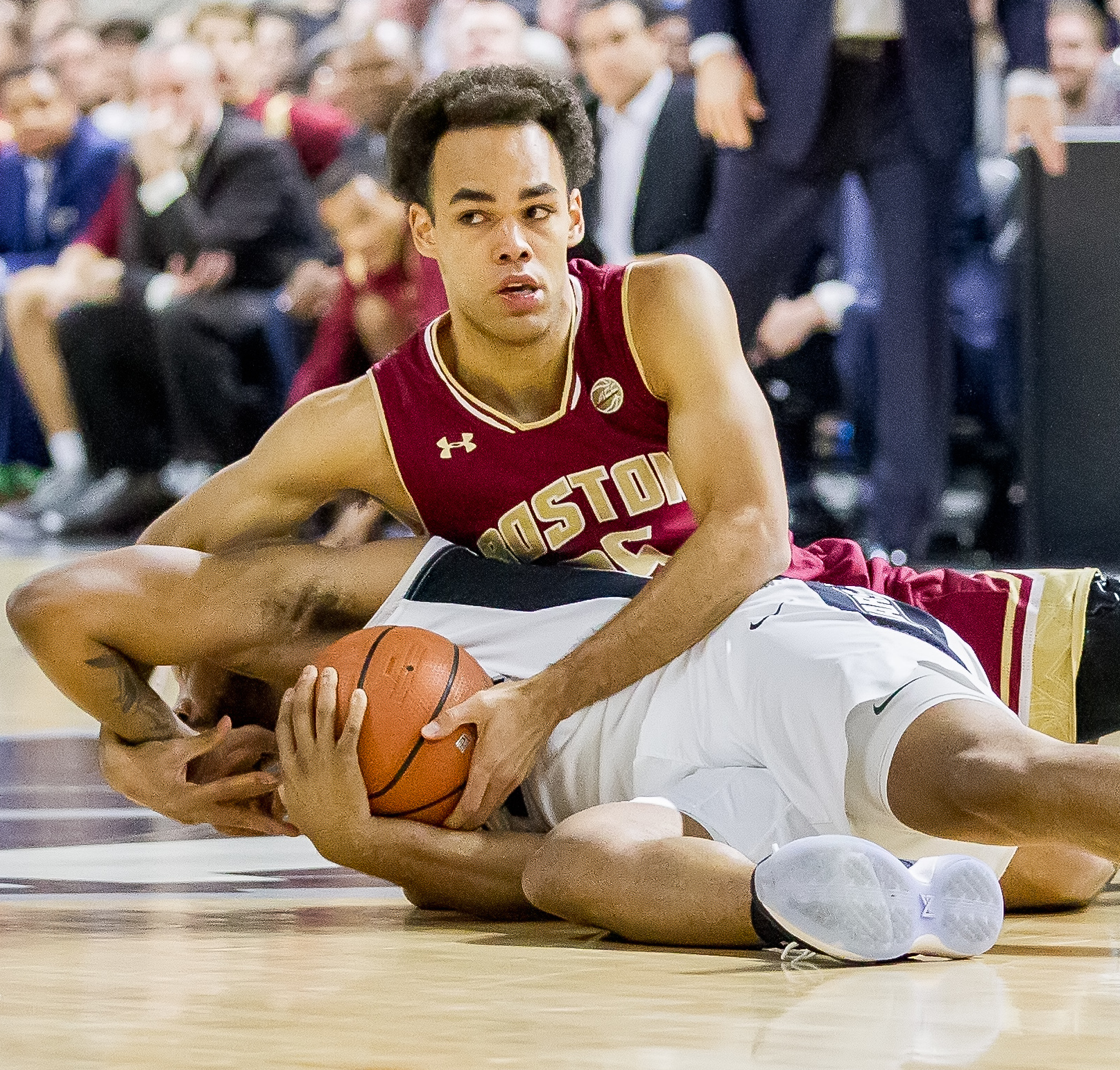
Chatman playing for Boston College

During the 2016–17 season, he made seven starts and averaged 8.6 points per game, shooting 41.7 percent from behind the arc. His best game came on January 29, 2017 against the Virginia Tech Hokies, scoring 30 points and made nine consecutive threes pointers, which set an Atlantic Coast Conference record. During his junior season, Chatman averaged 12.9 points, 2.9 rebounds, and 1.6 assists per game, hitting 87 three-pointers. On December 9, 2017, Chatman scored 22 points and helped the Boston College Eagles beat the previously undefeated and #1 nationally ranked Duke. He scored 30 points in a 78–73 overtime win against Richmond on December 23. During his senior season, Chatman dealt with ankle and finger injuries. He averaged 13.2 points, 2.2 rebounds, and 2.0 assists per game. He was named to the Fort Myers Tipoff all-tournament team. He ranks fifth all-time in career 3-pointers made and fourth in career 3-point FG percentage in Boston College school history. He became the 44th member of the Boston College 1,000 point club when he scored his 1000th collegiate point on Feb. 18, 2019 vs. Miami.

== Professional career ==
For his rookie season in 2019–20, Chatman signed with CSU Sibiu, a professional basketball team in Romania that competed in both the Liga Națională and FIBA Europe Cup. His best game in the Liga Națională was on February 1, 2020 when he scored 31 points in a victory vs Romanian powerhouse U-BT Cluj-Napoca. Chatman averaged 13.8 points, 2.3 rebounds, and 1.3 assists per game in FIBA Europe Cup games and made 14 three pointers in only two games vs Fribourg Olympic Basket. On February 28, 2021, Chatman signed with the Taoyuan Pilots of the P. League+. On November 29, 2021, Chatman signed with the Tainan TSG GhostHawks of the T1 League.

== Personal life ==
Chatman is the son of Jeff and Leah Chatman. His father played for the BYU Cougars from 1984–1988 and is ninth all time at BYU in scoring. Chatman served as a missionary for the Church of Jesus Christ of Latter-day Saints for two years (2012–2014) in Taipei, Taiwan where he learned to speak Mandarin Chinese. He graduated from BYU with a degree in Asian Studies. While at Boston College, Chatman pursued his Master of Business Administration degree. His wife is a Taiwan native.
