= Kadeem Jack =

American basketball player (born 1992)

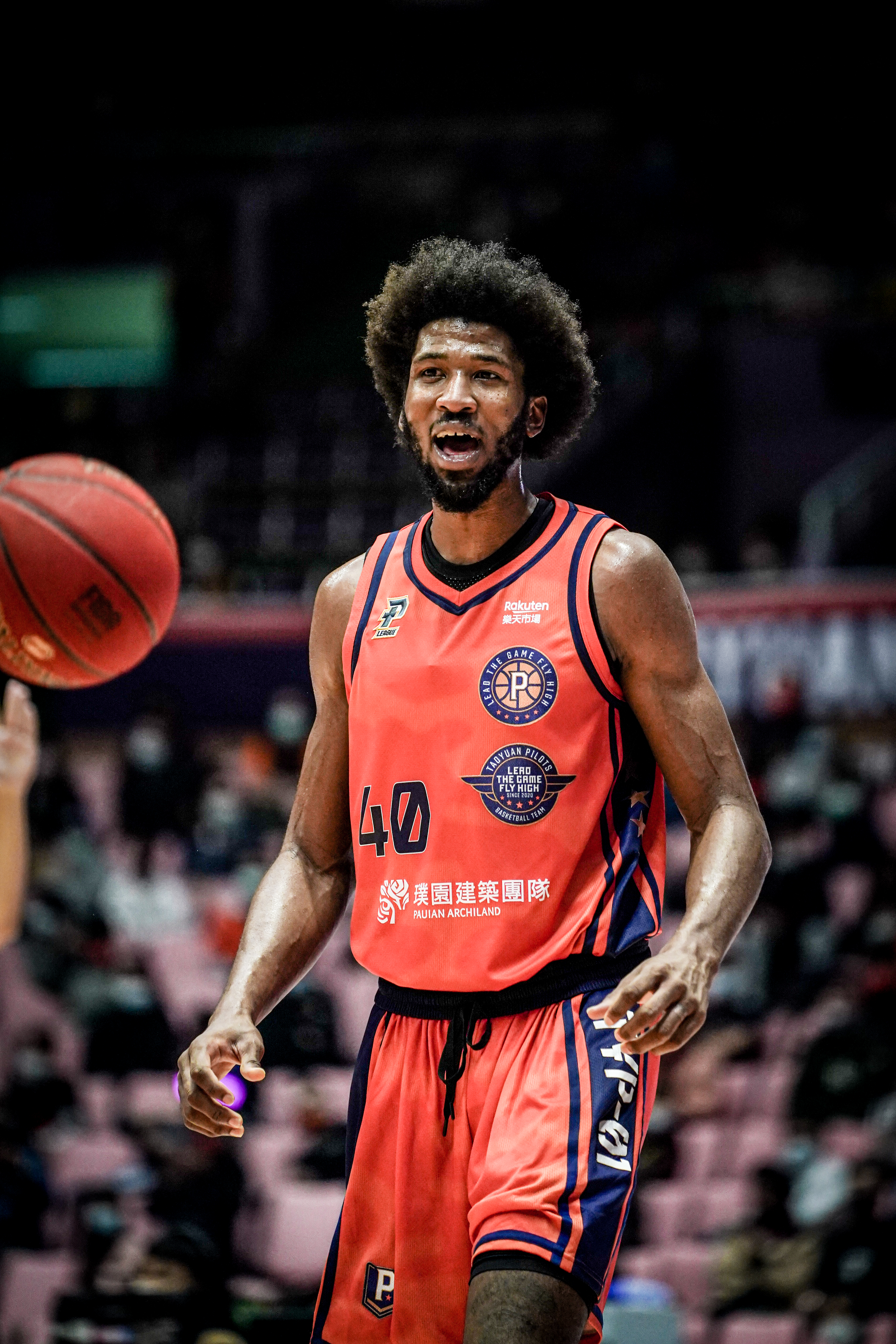
- Jack with the Taoyuan Pilots in 2021

Shijiazhuang Xianglan
- Position: Power forward / center
- League: NBL

Personal information
- Born: October 27, 1992 (age 34) Queens, New York, U.S.
- Listed height: 6 ft 9 in (2.06 m)
- Listed weight: 235 lb (107 kg)

Career information
- High school: Rice (Manhattan, New York)
- College: Rutgers (2011–2015)
- NBA draft: 2015: undrafted
- Playing career: 2015–present

Career history
- 2015–2016: Fort Wayne Mad Ants
- 2016: Reno Bighorns
- 2016: Hitachi SunRockers Tokyo-Shibuya
- 2016–2017: Reno Bighorns
- 2017–2018: Sioux Falls Skyforce
- 2018: South Bay Lakers
- 2019–2020: Oklahoma City Blue
- 2020–2021: Taoyuan Pilots
- 2021: Cangrejeros de Santurce
- 2022–2023: Sioux Falls Skyforce
- 2023–2024: Pieno žvaigždės Pasvalys
- 2024: Al Wahda
- 2024–2025: NorthPort Batang Pier
- 2025–present: Shijiazhuang Xianglan
- Stats at Basketball Reference

Kadeem Jack (born October 27, 1992) is a Trinidadian-American professional basketball player for the Shijiazhuang Xianglan of the National Basketball League (NBL). He played college basketball for Rutgers.

== High school career ==
Jack attended Rice high school in Manhattan where he was a NYSSWA First Team All-State and New York Daily News All-City selection after averaging 16.5 points-per-game as a senior, being mentioned as a four star recruit by Rivals.com and both the No. 33 overall prospect and No. 7 power forward in the country.

== College career ==
After four years at Rutgers, Jack, a team captain for the Scarlet Knights, graduated with 1,044 career points. During his senior campaign, he averaged 13 points and 6.4 rebounds in 31.1 minutes-per-game, earning All-Metropolitan honors for a second consecutive year.

== Professional career ==
=== Fort Wayne Mad Ants (2015–2016) ===
After going undrafted in the 2015 NBA draft, Jack signed with the Indiana Pacers on October 7, 2015. However, he was waived by the Pacers on October 24 after appearing in one preseason game. Five days later, he was acquired by the Fort Wayne Mad Ants of the NBA Development League as an affiliate player of the Pacers.

=== Reno Bighorns (2016) ===
On January 4, 2016, he was traded to the Reno Bighorns in exchange for the returning player rights to Christian Watford.

=== Hitachi SunRockers Tokyo-Shibuya (2016) ===
On August 3, 2016, Jack signed with Hitachi SunRockers Tokyo-Shibuya of the B.League. On October 14, his contract was terminated.

=== Return to the Reno Bighorns (2016–2017) ===
On October 31, he was re-acquired by the Reno Bighorns.

=== Sioux Falls Skyforce (2017–2018) ===
On March 2, 2017, Jack was traded to the Sioux Falls Skyforce.

=== Hapoel Gilboa Galil (2018) ===
On August 5, 2018, Jack signed with the Israeli team Hapoel Gilboa Galil for the 2018–19 season. However, on September 20, 2018, he parted ways with Gilboa Galil before appearing in a game for them.

=== South Bay Lakers (2018) ===
On October 23, 2018, Jack joined the South Bay Lakers of the G League.

=== Oklahoma City Blue (2019–2020) ===
Oklahoma City Thunder signs signed Jack to Training Camp deal in October 2019. Jack then joined the Oklahoma City Blue in October 2019 at the start of the Gleague season . On January 19, 2020, he posted 26 points, 13 rebounds, two blocks and an assist across in a 129–125 win over the Santa Cruz Warriors. Jack averaged 12.9 points, 8.2 rebounds, 1.0 assists, 0.9 blocks and 0.5 steals per game.

=== Cangrejeros de Santurce (2021) ===
On August 22, 2021, Jack signed with Cangrejeros de Santurce of the Baloncesto Superior Nacional.

On October 28, 2021, Jack signed with Capitanes de la Ciudad de México of the NBA G League. However, he was waived before the season opener.

=== Return to the Oklahoma City Blue (2021–2022) ===
On December 30, 2021, Jack was acquired by the Oklahoma City Blue of the NBA G League, but was later waived on January 5, 2022.

=== Sioux Falls Skyforce (2022–2023) ===
On October 24, 2022, Jack joined the Sioux Falls Skyforce training camp roster.

=== Pieno žvaigždės Pasvalys (2023–2024) ===
On September 18, 2023, Jack signed with Pieno žvaigždės Pasvalys of the Lithuanian Basketball League (LKL).

=== Al Wahda (2024) ===
On October 3, 2024, Jack signed with the Al Wahda of the UAE National Basketball League.

=== NorthPort Batang Pier (2024–2025) ===
On November 25, 2024, Jack signed with the NorthPort Batang Pier of the Philippine Basketball Association (PBA) as the team's import for the 2024–25 PBA Commissioner's Cup.

== Personal life ==
The son of Louisa Hall, a registered nurse, Jack majored in journalism and mass media studies.
