= Deh Yu College of Nursing and Health =

College in Zhongshan, Keelung, Taiwan

- 經國管理暨健康學院
- Established: 1957 (as Deh-Yu College of Nursing and Management); 2002 (as CKIMH); 2023 Deh Yu College of Nursing and Health
- Location: Zhongshan, Keelung, Taiwan; 25.1511°N 121.7278°E
- Website: Official website

Deh Yu College of Nursing and Health
- Traditional Chinese: 經國管理暨健康學院
Transcriptions
Standard Mandarin
- Hanyu Pinyin: Jīngguó Guǎnlǐ Jì Jiànkāng Xuéyuàn
Southern Min
- Hokkien POJ: Keng-kok Koán-lí Kì Kiān-khong Ha̍k-īⁿ

Deh Yu College of Nursing and Health (CKIMH; Chinese: 經國管理暨健康學院; Pe̍h-ōe-jī: Keng-kok Koán-lí Kì Kiān-khong Ha̍k-īⁿ) is a private college in Zhongshan District, Keelung City, Taiwan. It was later renamed in 2000 to reflect its focus on management and health-related programs.

CKIMH offers a wide range of undergraduate and graduate programs, including those in business administration, accounting, nursing, health care management, and traditional Chinese medicine.

== History ==
The university was originally established as Deh-Yu College of Nursing and Management in 1957. In 2002, it was upgraded to Deh-Yu Institute and subsequently Ching Kuo Institute of Management and Health. 2023 Deh Yu College of Nursing and Health

== Faculty ==
- Department of Applied Cosmetic Science
- Department of Applied Information and Multimedia
- Department of Child Educare
- Department of Culinary Arts
- Department of Food and Health Science
- Department of Nursing
- Department of Hotel and Restaurant Management
- Department of Senior Citizen Service Management
- Department of Sports, Health and Leisure
- Department of Style Design and Fashion Performance

== Transportation ==
The school is accessible North West from Keelung Station of Taiwan Railway.

== See also ==
- List of universities in Taiwan
