= Davon Reed =

American basketball player (born 1995)

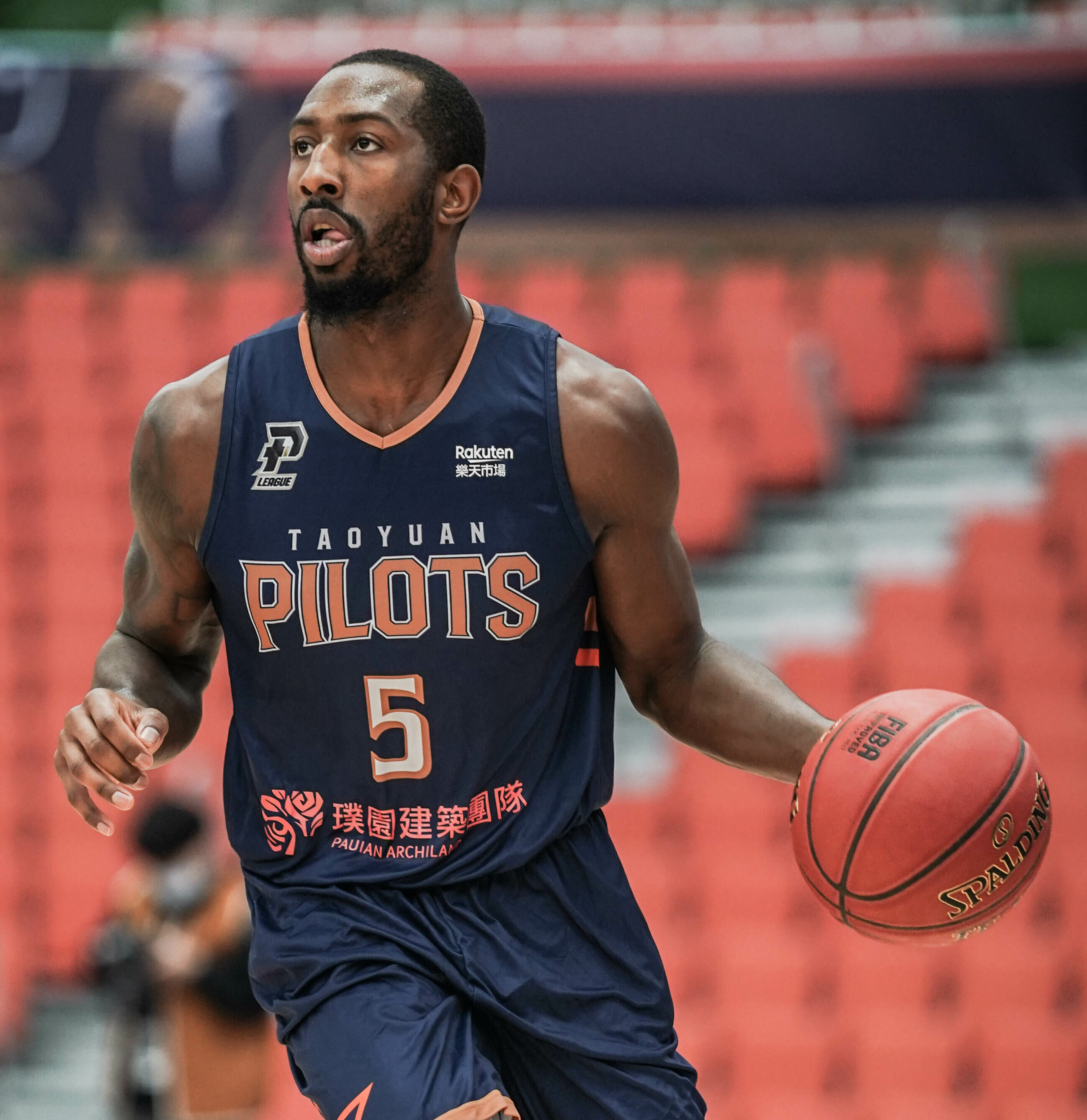
- Reed with the Taoyuan Pilots in 2021

No. 9 – Anyang Jung Kwan Jang Red Boosters
- Position: Shooting guard
- League: KBL

Personal information
- Born: June 11, 1995 (age 31) Ewing Township, New Jersey, U.S.
- Listed height: 6 ft 5 in (1.96 m)
- Listed weight: 206 lb (93 kg)

Career information
- High school: Princeton Day School (Princeton, New Jersey)
- College: Miami (Florida) (2013–2017)
- NBA draft: 2017: 2nd round, 32nd overall pick
- Drafted by: Phoenix Suns
- Playing career: 2017–present

Career history
- 2017–2018: Phoenix Suns
- 2017–2018: →Northern Arizona Suns
- 2018–2019: Indiana Pacers
- 2018–2019: →Fort Wayne Mad Ants
- 2019–2020: Sioux Falls Skyforce
- 2020–2021: Taoyuan Pilots
- 2021: Grand Rapids Gold
- 2021–2023: Denver Nuggets
- 2023: Los Angeles Lakers
- 2023: Prometey
- 2023–2024: Memphis Hustle
- 2024–2025: Mexico City Capitanes
- 2025: Birmingham Squadron
- 2025–2026: Rizing Zephyr Fukuoka
- 2026: Koshigaya Alphas
- 2026: Saga Ballooners
- 2026–present: Anyang Jung Kwan Jang Red Boosters

Career highlights
- Third-team All-ACC (2017)
- Stats at NBA.com
- Stats at Basketball Reference

Davon Malcolm Reed (born June 11, 1995) is a Puerto Rican professional basketball player for the Anyang Jung Kwan Jang Red Boosters of the Korean Basketball League (KBL). After playing college basketball for the Miami Hurricanes, he was selected with the 32nd pick in the 2017 NBA draft by the Phoenix Suns.

== Early life and education ==
Reed was born in Ewing Township, New Jersey, on June 11, 1995.

=== High school career ===
A resident of Ewing Township, New Jersey, Reed attended Princeton Day School from 2009 to 2013. In his four-year career, Reed would score 2102 points at PDS, the highest in the school's history.

=== College career ===
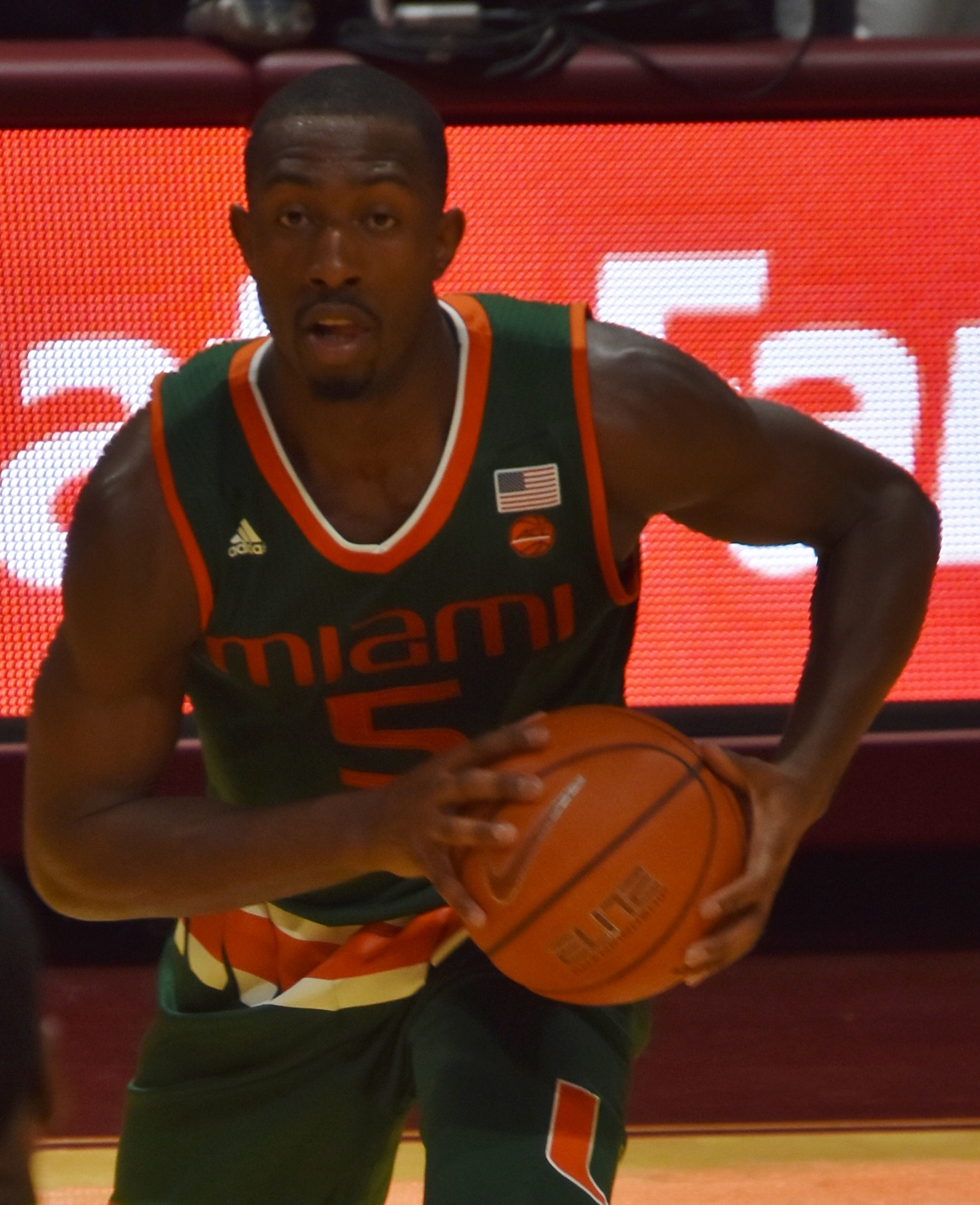
Davon Reed handles the ball for the Hurricanes.

Reed attended the University of Miami from 2013 to 2017. He averaged 10.3 points and 3.6 rebounds per game throughout four seasons of playing time, with his best averages being 14.9 points and 4.8 rebounds in his last season for Miami. Reed developed a reputation as a good shooter who can defend four positions. As a senior he was named to the All-Atlantic Coast Conference Third Team and All-Atlantic Coast Conference Defensive Team, as well as earned the Skip Prosser Award for Scholar Athletes.

== Professional career ==
=== Phoenix Suns (2017–2018) ===
Reed was selected as the 32nd pick of the 2017 NBA draft by the Phoenix Suns. He joined fellow rookies Josh Jackson and Alec Peters in the 2017 NBA Summer League alongside Suns' players Dragan Bender, Marquese Chriss, Tyler Ulis, and Derrick Jones Jr. Reed signed a four-year deal with the Suns on July 6, 2017. In the 2017 Summer League, Reed recorded averages of 14.0 points, 4.0 rebounds, 1.2 assists, and 1.2 steals per game in six games. On August 25, 2017, it was announced that Reed would have surgery on his left meniscus and miss the next four to six months. On December 28, Reed was assigned to the Northern Arizona Suns. He played his first professional game with Northern Arizona on January 2, 2018, recording 11 points, 3 assists, and 2 rebounds in 20 minutes of play during a 113–108 win over the Rio Grande Valley Vipers. He played one more game on January 5 recording 10 points, 8 rebounds, and 5 assists in 22 minutes during a 125–104 win over the Reno Bighorns before being called up to Phoenix the next day. However, he did not play for Phoenix and was reassigned to Northern Arizona on January 8. He returned to Phoenix after the annual NBA G League Showcase on January 12. Reed made his NBA debut with Phoenix on January 14, recording a rebound in less than four minutes of play during a blowout loss to the Indiana Pacers. He returned to Northern Arizona on January 21 and then back to Phoenix six days later. He recorded his first assist in a loss to the Memphis Grizzlies on January 29 before recording his first basket (via three-pointer) and a steal in a loss to the Utah Jazz on February 2. On March 10, after completing more assignments in Northern Arizona, Reed had his best game with Phoenix recording a season-high 16 points, making all four of his three-point shots, 6 rebounds, and 2 assists in a 122–115 loss to the Charlotte Hornets.

On July 1, 2018, Reed was added to the Phoenix Suns' 2018 NBA Summer League team alongside the majority of the team's young squad. In the team's first Summer League game, Reed scored 18 points, including 4 of 5 three-pointers made, 3 rebounds, 2 steals, an assist, and a block in a 92–85 win over the Dallas Mavericks. The next day, Reed recorded 12 points, 5 rebounds, 3 assists, and 2 steals in a 71–63 win over the Sacramento Kings. At the end of the event, Reed averaged 13.4 points, 4.4 rebounds, 3 assists, and 0.8 steals per game and Phoenix guaranteed his contract for a second year. However, on October 16, 2018, Reed was waived by the Phoenix Suns and replaced on the roster by veteran Jamal Crawford.

=== Indiana Pacers (2018–2019) ===
On October 19, three days after being waived by the Suns, Reed signed a two-way contract with the Indiana Pacers and their NBA G League affiliate, the Fort Wayne Mad Ants. He filled the roster spot held by C. J. Wilcox after he suffered a season-ending injury.

=== Sioux Falls Skyforce (2019–2020) ===
On September 4, 2019, Reed signed with the Miami Heat. Following training camp, Reed was added to the roster of the Heat's NBA G League affiliate, the Sioux Falls Skyforce. On February 5, 2020, Reed posted 29 points, 11 rebounds, eight assists and three steals for Sioux Falls in a 123–117 loss to the Iowa Wolves. Reed averaged 12.7 points, 6.6 rebounds and 3.8 assists per game and became the only player in the G League to have at least 500 points, 250 rebounds and 150 assists.

=== Taoyuan Pilots (2020–2021) ===
In November 2020, Reed joined the Taoyuan Pilots of the P. League+. In April 2021, Taoyuan Pilots decided to let Reed come back to the states for treatment.

=== Denver Nuggets / Grand Rapids Gold (2021–2023) ===
In August 2021, Reed joined the Denver Nuggets for the 2021 NBA Summer League and on September 27, he signed with them. However, he was waived at the end of training camp. Thirteen days later, he joined the Grand Rapids Gold, appearing in seven games and averaging 15.0 points, 8.3 rebounds, 6.0 assists and 2.14 steals while shooting 42.9% from three in 35.8 minutes per game.

On December 4, 2021, Reed signed a 10-day contract with Denver and rejoined Grand Rapids on December 15, making another appearance. Four days later, Reed signed a second 10-day contract with the Nuggets and a third on December 30. On January 9, 2022, he signed a two-way contract with the Nuggets.

On July 8, 2022, Reed re-signed with the Nuggets on a multiyear deal.

=== Los Angeles Lakers (2023) ===
On February 9, 2023, Reed was traded to the Los Angeles Lakers in a four-team trade involving the Denver Nuggets, Los Angeles Clippers and Orlando Magic. He was waived on April 9, 2023.

=== Prometey (2023) ===
On July 20, 2023, Reed signed with Prometey of the Latvian–Estonian Basketball League.

=== Memphis Hustle (2023–2024) ===
On December 3, 2023, Reed joined the Memphis Hustle of the NBA G League.

On March 2, 2024, Reed was selected second overall in the 2024 BSN draft by the Santeros de Aguada, but never played for them.

=== Mexico City Capitanes (2024–2025) ===
On September 4, 2024, Reed was traded to the Mexico City Capitanes.

== Career statistics ==
Legend
GP	Games played	GS	Games started	MPG	Minutes per game
FG%	Field goal percentage	3P%	3-point field goal percentage	FT%	Free throw percentage
RPG	Rebounds per game	APG	Assists per game	SPG	Steals per game
BPG	Blocks per game	PPG	Points per game	**Bold**	Career high

=== NBA ===
==== Regular season ====
Year	Team	GP	GS	MPG	FG%	3P%	FT%	RPG	APG	SPG	BPG	PPG
2017–18	Phoenix	21	1	11.5	.289	.289	.667	1.9	.6	**.5**	.1	3.0
2018–19	Indiana	10	0	4.7	.417	**.500**	–	.6	.3	.1	.0	1.2
2021–22	Denver	**48**	**5**	**13.9**	.503	.430	.667	**2.3**	**1.1**	**.5**	**.2**	**4.4**
2022–23	Denver	35	1	9.0	.313	.364	**.750**	1.6	.5	.4	.1	2.3
2022–23	L.A. Lakers	8	0	3.4	**.750**	**.500**	.250	.5	.5	.3	.0	1.0
Career		122	7	10.6	.408	.385	.667	1.7	.8	.4	.1	3.1

=== College ===
Year	Team	GP	GS	MPG	FG%	3P%	FT%	RPG	APG	SPG	BPG	PPG
2013–14	Miami	33	10	20.7	.343	.357	.673	1.7	1.2	.5	.1	6.6
2014–15	Miami	30	21	27.5	**.470**	**.457**	.727	4.0	1.9	.9	.4	8.2
2015–16	Miami	**35**	**35**	28.8	.469	.383	.816	4.1	1.2	.8	.4	11.1
2016–17	Miami	33	33	**35.3**	.433	.397	**.833**	**4.8**	**2.4**	**1.3**	**.5**	**14.9**
Career		131	99	28.1	.430	.395	.779	3.6	1.6	.9	.4	10.3
