= Willie Warren =

American basketball player (born 1989)

Personal information
- Born: October 22, 1989 (age 37) Dallas, Texas, U.S.
- Listed height: 6 ft 4 in (1.93 m)
- Listed weight: 200 lb (91 kg)

Career information
- High school: North Crowley (Fort Worth, Texas)
- College: Oklahoma (2008–2010)
- NBA draft: 2010: 2nd round, 54th overall pick
- Drafted by: Los Angeles Clippers
- Playing career: 2010–2024
- Position: Point guard / shooting guard

Career history
- 2010–2011: Los Angeles Clippers
- 2011: →Bakersfield Jam
- 2012: Rio Grande Valley Vipers
- 2012–2013: Maccabi Rishon LeZion
- 2013–2014: Szolnoki Olaj
- 2014: Virtus Bologna
- 2014–2015: Chongqing Fly Dragons
- 2015–2017: Zhejiang Golden Bulls
- 2017: Petrochimi Bandar Imam
- 2017–2018: Shanxi Brave Dragons
- 2018: Texas Legends
- 2018: Hoops Club
- 2019: Al Riyadi Beirut
- 2019–2020: Mineros de Zacatecas
- 2020–2021: Taoyuan Pilots
- 2021–2022: Al-Shamal SC
- 2022: Piratas de La Guaira
- 2022–2023: Dijlah University College
- 2023–2024: Al-Qurain SC

Career highlights
- CBA All-Star (2016); Second-team All-Big 12 (2009); Big 12 Freshman of the Year (2009); Big 12 All-Rookie team (2009); McDonald's All-American (2008); Third-team Parade All-American (2008); Texas Mr. Basketball (2008)
- Stats at NBA.com
- Stats at Basketball Reference

Willie D. Warren (born October 22, 1989) is an American former professional basketball player. He played college basketball for the Oklahoma Sooners.

== High school career ==
After a successful high school career at North Crowley High School, Warren was selected to be a McDonald's All-American. Considered a five-star recruit by Rivals.com, Warren was listed as the No. 4 point guard and the No. 10 player in the nation in 2008.

== College career ==
Warren then went to the University of Oklahoma where he played on the same team as his eventual Clippers teammate, Blake Griffin. Despite being a projected lottery pick after a successful Freshman year, Warren stayed at OU, hoping to be the primary option with Griffin leaving for the draft. Throughout an injury-plagued Sophomore year he averaged over 16 points, 4 assists, 3 rebounds and just over 1 steal a game while shooting above 30% from 3-point range . At the end of his sophomore season, Warren decided to forgo his last two years of eligibility, signing with an agent and declaring for the 2010 NBA draft.

== Professional career ==
Warren was drafted late in the 2nd round as the 54th overall by the Los Angeles Clippers on the day of the 2010 NBA draft. Then, on July 13, 2010, he was signed by the Clippers.

Late in the 2010–11 season, Warren was assigned to the NBA D-League. There, he played 6 games in 2011 for the Bakersfield Jam of the NBA D-League where he averaged 21.0 points, 7.0 assists, 5.3 rebounds and 1.0 steals per game while shooting above 50 percent from the field and 46 percent from 3-point range. The Jam went 5–1 with Warren in the lineup from February 4 – 16. After the D-League stint, Warren was called back into the Clippers' line-up, but he was later reassigned for a second stint on March 2, 2011. On December 19, 2011, Warren was waived by the Clippers.

In August 2012, Warren signed with Maccabi Rishon LeZion of the Israeli Super League for the 2012–13 season.

In the summer of 2013, he signed with Szolnoki Olaj KK of Hungary. On February 28, 2014, he was waived by Szolnoki. On March 4, 2014, he signed with Virtus Bologna of Italy for the rest of the 2013–14 Lega Basket Serie A season.

On September 18, 2014, Warren signed with Chongqing Fly Dragons of Chinese Basketball Association. On April 16, 2015, he signed with Club Sagesse of the Lebanese Basketball League. However, he never joined the Lebanese team due to an injury.

On August 6, 2015, Warren signed with Zhejiang Golden Bulls for the 2015–16 season. He later re-signed with Zhejiang for one more season.

On August 13, 2017, Warren signed with Petrochimi Bandar Imam of the Iranian Basketball Super League.

On December 9, 2017, Warren signed with the Shanxi Brave Dragons of the Chinese Basketball Association.

On February 22, 2018, Warren was acquired by the Texas Legends, but was waived on March 23 after playing three games.

On June 30, 2019, he has signed with Sporting Al Riyadi Beirut of the Lebanese Basketball League.

== NBA career statistics ==
Legend
GP	Games played	GS	Games started	MPG	Minutes per game
FG%	Field goal percentage	3P%	3-point field goal percentage	FT%	Free throw percentage
RPG	Rebounds per game	APG	Assists per game	SPG	Steals per game
BPG	Blocks per game	PPG	Points per game	**Bold**	Career high

=== Regular season ===
Year	Team	GP	GS	MPG	FG%	3P%	FT%	RPG	APG	SPG	BPG	PPG
2010–11	L.A. Clippers	19	0	17.1	.371	.333	.750	.6	1.4	.3	.0	1.9
Career		19	0	17.1	.371	.333	.750	.6	1.4	.3	.0	1.9
