= LSU Tigers men's basketball statistical leaders =

The LSU Tigers basketball statistical leaders are individual statistical leaders of the LSU Tigers basketball program in various categories, including points, rebounds, assists, steals, and blocks. Within those areas, the lists identify single-game, single-season, and career leaders. The Tigers represent Louisiana State University in the NCAA's Southeastern Conference.

LSU began competing in intercollegiate basketball in 1908. However, the school's record book does not generally list records from before the 1950s, as records from before this period are often incomplete and inconsistent. Since scoring was much lower in this era, and teams played much fewer games during a typical season, it is likely that few or no players from this era would appear on these lists anyway.

The NCAA did not officially record assists as a stat until the 1983–84 season, and blocks and steals until the 1985–86 season, but LSU's record books includes players in these stats before these seasons. These lists are updated through the end of the 2020–21 season.

== Scoring ==
NCAA Division I records (career / season)

Career
Rk	Player	Points	Seasons
1	Pete Maravich	3667	1967–68 1968–69 1969–70
2	Rudy Macklin	2080	1976–77 1977–78 1978–79 1979–80 1980–81
3	Tasmin Mitchell	1989	2005–06 2006–07 2007–08 2008–09 2009–10
4	Howard Carter	1942	1979–80 1980–81 1981–82 1982–83
5	Shaquille O'Neal	1941	1989–90 1990–91 1991–92
6	Bob Pettit	1916	1951–52 1952–53 1953–54
7	Kenny Higgs	1896	1974–75 1975–76 1976–77 1977–78
8	Chris Jackson	1854	1988–89 1989–90
9	Ronald Dupree	1726	1999–00 2000–01 2001–02 2002–03
10	Skylar Mays	1617	2016–17 2017–18 2018–19 2019–20

Season
Rk	Player	Points	Season
1	Pete Maravich	1381	1969–70
2	Pete Maravich	1148	1968–69
3	Pete Maravich	1138	1967–68
4	Chris Jackson	965	1988–89
5	Chris Jackson	889	1989–90
6	Bob Pettit	785	1953–54
7	Shaquille O'Neal	774	1990–91
8	Marcus Thornton	739	2008–09
9	Shaquille O'Neal	722	1991–92
10	Glen Davis	669	2005–06

Single game
Rk	Player	Points	Season	Opponent
1	Pete Maravich	69	1969–70	Alabama
2	Pete Maravich	66	1968–69	Tulane
3	Pete Maravich	64	1969–70	Kentucky
4	Pete Maravich	61	1969–70	Vanderbilt
5	Bob Pettit	60	1953–54	Louisiana College
6	Pete Maravich	59	1967–68	Alabama
7	Pete Maravich	58	1968–69	Georgia
	Pete Maravich	58	1967–68	Mississippi State
9	Bob Pettit	57	1953–54	Georgia

== Rebounds ==
Career
Rk	Player	Rebounds	Seasons
1	Rudy Macklin	1276	1976–77 1977–78 1978–79 1979–80 1980–81
2	Shaquille O'Neal	1217	1989–90 1990–91 1991–92
3	Al Sanders	1168	1969–70 1970–71 1971–72
4	Bob Pettit	1039	1951–52 1952–53 1953–54
5	Ned Clark	998	1951–52 1952–53 1953–54 1954–55
6	Tasmin Mitchell	950	2005–06 2006–07 2007–08 2008–09 2009–10
7	Leonard Mitchell	922	1980–81 1981–82 1982–83 1983–84
8	Glen Davis	916	2004–05 2005–06 2006–07
9	Ronald Dupree	907	1999–00 2000–01 2001–02 2002–03
10	Darius Days	830	2018–19 2019–20 2020–21 2021–22

Season
Rk	Player	Rebounds	Season
1	Al Sanders	474	1969–70
2	Bob Pettit	432	1953–54
3	Shaquille O'Neal	421	1991–92
4	Shaquille O'Neal	411	1990–91
5	Ben Simmons	388	2015–16
6	Shaquille O'Neal	385	1989–90
7	Ned Clark	380	1954–55
8	Al Sanders	369	1970–71
9	Rudy Macklin	351	1980–81
10	Glen Davis	350	2005–06

Single game
Rk	Player	Rebounds	Season	Opponent
1	Durand Macklin	32	1976–77	Tulane
2	Al Sanders	26	1971–72	Mississippi State
	Al Sanders	26	1970–71	Mississippi State
4	Dan Hester	25	1969–70	Ole Miss
	Al Sanders	25	1970–71	Florida
	Bob Pettit	25	1953–54	Holy Cross

== Assists ==
Career
Rk	Player	Assists	Seasons
1	Kenny Higgs	645	1974–75 1975–76 1976–77 1977–78
2	Ethan Martin	638	1977–78 1978–79 1979–80 1980–81
3	Torris Bright	544	1999–00 2000–01 2001–02 2002–03
4	Garrett Temple	481	2005–06 2006–07 2007–08 2008–09
5	Pete Maravich	425	1967–68 1968–69 1969–70
6	Derrick Taylor	404	1981–82 1983–84 1984–85 1985–86
7	Tremont Waters	390	2017–18 2018–19
8	Skylar Mays	382	2016–17 2017–18 2018–19 2019–20
9	Darrel Mitchell	367	2002–03 2003–04 2004–05 2005–06
10	Anthony Hickey	360	2011–12 2012–13 2013–14

Season
Rk	Player	Assists	Season
1	Kenny Higgs	239	1976–77
2	Tremont Waters	198	2017–18
3	T. J. Pugh	196	1990–91
4	Pete Maravich	192	1969–70
	Tremont Waters	192	2018–19
6	Ethan Martin	190	1980–81
7	Ethan Martin	174	1979–80
8	Kenny Higgs	173	1975–76
9	Darrel Mitchell	160	2005–06
10	Ben Simmons	158	2015–16

Single game
Rk	Player	Assists	Season	Opponent
1	Kenny Higgs	19	1976–77	Georgia
2	Randy Livingston	18	1994–95	George Mason
	Kenny Higgs	18	1976–77	Tennessee
4	Kenny Higgs	17	1975–76	Mississippi State
5	Ethan Martin	16	1980–81	Tulane
	Kenny Higgs	16	1975–76	Vanderbilt

== Steals ==
Career
Rk	Player	Steals	Seasons
1	Clarence Caesar	310	1991–92 1992–93 1993–94 1994–95
2	Ethan Martin	279	1977–78 1978–79 1979–80 1980–81
3	Torris Bright	246	1999–00 2000–01 2001–02 2002–03
4	Darrel Mitchell	219	2002–03 2003–04 2004–05 2005–06
5	Anthony Hickey	216	2011–12 2012–13 2013–14
6	Skylar Mays	213	2016–17 2017–18 2018–19 2019–20
7	Derrick Taylor	207	1981–82 1983–84 1984–85 1985–86
8	Jerry Reynolds	194	1982–83 1983–84 1984–85
9	Garrett Temple	191	2005–06 2006–07 2007–08 2008–09
10	Tasmin Mitchell	190	2005–06 2006–07 2007–08 2008–09 2009–10

Season
Rk	Player	Steals	Season
1	Tremont Waters	96	2018–19
2	Darryl Joe	93	1986–87
3	Clarence Caesar	90	1991–92
4	Anthony Hickey	85	2012–13
5	Derrick Taylor	84	1985–86
6	Ethan Martin	83	1980–81
7	Shawn Griggs	81	1990–91
	Jerry Reynolds	81	1983–84
9	Darryl Joe	80	1987–88
	Clarence Caesar	80	1993–94

Single game
Rk	Player	Steals	Season	Opponent
1	Shawn Griggs	10	1990–91	Tennessee
2	Tremont Waters	8	2018–19	ULM
	Tremont Waters	8	2017–18	Texas A&M
	Anthony Hickey	8	2012–13	Texas A&M
	Clarence Caesar	8	1993–94	Auburn
	Shawn Griggs	8	1990–91	Loyola Marymount
	Shawn Griggs	8	1990–91	Arizona
	Derrick Taylor	8	1985–86	Hawaii-Loa

== Blocks ==
Career
Rk	Player	Blocks	Seasons
1	Shaquille O'Neal	412	1989–90 1990–91 1991–92
2	Jordan Mickey	219	2013–14 2014–15
3	Chris Johnson	176	2005–06 2006–07 2007–08 2008–09
4	Stromile Swift	130	1998–99 1999–00
5	Storm Warren	121	2008–09 2009–10 2010–11 2011–12
6	Garrett Temple	111	2005–06 2006–07 2007–08 2008–09
7	Glen Davis	110	2004–05 2005–06 2006–07
8	Brandon Bass	104	2003–04 2004–05
9	José Vargas	100	1984–85 1985–86 1986–87 1987–88
10	Tyrus Thomas	99	2005–06

Season
Rk	Player	Blocks	Season
1	Shaquille O'Neal	157	1991–92
2	Shaquille O'Neal	140	1990–91
3	Shaquille O'Neal	115	1989–90
4	Jordan Mickey	113	2014–15
5	Jordan Mickey	106	2013–14
6	Tyrus Thomas	99	2005–06
7	Stromile Swift	95	1999–00
	Chris Johnson	95	2008–09
9	Anthony Randolph	70	2007–08
10	Kavell Bigby-Williams	67	2018–19

Single game
Rk	Player	Blocks	Season	Opponent
1	Shaquille O'Neal	12	1989–90	Loyola Marymount
2	Stromile Swift	11	1998–99	Alabama
	Shaquille O'Neal	11	1991–92	BYU
	Shaquille O'Neal	11	1991–92	Auburn
	Shaquille O'Neal	11	1991–92	South Carolina
6	Shaquille O'Neal	10	1990–91	Florida
	Shaquille O'Neal	10	1989–90	Texas
