= 2022–23 Taipei Fubon Braves season =

Taiwanese professional basketball season

Taipei Fubon Braves
2022–23 season
- President: Tsai Cherng-Ru
- General Manager: Tsai Cherng-Ru
- Head Coach: Hsu Chin-Che
- Arena: Taipei Heping Basketball Gymnasium
- PLG: 25–15 (.625)
- Playoffs: PLG champions (defeated Kings 4–2)
- EASL: 0–2
- Scoring leader: Mike Singletary (23.29)
- Rebounding leader: Chris Johnson (14.52)
- Assists leader: Mike Singletary (4.71)
- Highest home attendance: 7,000 (3 games)
- Lowest home attendance: 4,965 (February 21, 2023)
- Average home attendance: 6,063
- Biggest win: Braves 114–80 Steelers (December 17, 2022)
- Biggest defeat: Braves 89–107 Dreamers (April 29, 2023)
- All statistics correct as of June 15, 2023.

The 2022–23 Taipei Fubon Braves season was the franchise's 25th league season, the franchise's third season in the P. LEAGUE+ (PLG), its 4th in Taipei City. The Braves are coached by Hsu Chin-Che in his sixth year as head coach. The Braves also participated in 2023 East Asia Super League as the 2022 P. League+ champions.

== Draft ==
Round	Pick	Player	Position	Status	School/club team
1	2	Chen Fan Po-Yen	F	Local	UCH
1	6	Jian Ting-Jhao	G	Local	UCH

The Braves acquired 2022 first-round draft pick from Kaohsiung Steelers in exchange for Wang Lu-Hsiang.

== Standings ==
Pos	Team	W	L	PCT	GB	Qualification
1	New Taipei Kings	27	13	.675	—	Playoffs
2	Taipei Fubon Braves	25	15	.625	2	Playoffs
3	Taoyuan Pauian Pilots	19	21	.475	8	Playoffs
4	Formosa Taishin Dreamers	19	21	.475	8	Playoffs
5	Kaohsiung 17LIVE Steelers	17	23	.425	10	
6	Hsinchu JKO Lioneers	13	27	.325	14	

Updated to match(es) played on May 14, 2023. Source: P.League+

== Roster ==
Note: Flags indicate national team eligibility at FIBA-sanctioned events. Players may hold other non-FIBA nationalities not displayed.

2022–23 Taipei Fubon Braves roster
Players
Coaches

Pos.	No.	Nat.	Name	Ht.	Wt.	Age	From
G	0	(Taiwan)	Lai Ting-En	1.76 m (5 ft 9 in)	70 kg (154 lb)	30 – 22 July 1996	Fu Jen
F	1	(Taiwan)	Chen Fan Po-Yen	1.96 m (6 ft 5 in)	103 kg (227 lb)	26 – 24 January 2000	Chien Hsin Tech
G	3	(Taiwan)	Chang Tsung-Hsien	1.92 m (6 ft 4 in)	88 kg (194 lb)	37 – 27 December 1988	BYU–Hawaii
F/C	5	(United States)	Chris Johnson (I)	2.11 m (6 ft 11 in)	105 kg (231 lb)	41 – 17 July 1985	LSU
G	7	(Taiwan)	Lu Zong-Lin	1.75 m (5 ft 9 in)	70 kg (154 lb)	31 – 17 November 1994	NTUST
F	8	(Taiwan)	Chou Kuei-Yu	1.93 m (6 ft 4 in)	95 kg (209 lb)	28 – 19 July 1998	NTNU
F	10	(France) (Taiwan)	Steven Guinchard	1.95 m (6 ft 5 in)	85 kg (187 lb)	33 – 4 July 1993	EC Georgia
G	11	(Taiwan)	Hung Kai-Chieh	1.85 m (6 ft 1 in)	85 kg (187 lb)	27 – 7 October 1998	NCCU
F	12	(Taiwan)	Lin Chih-Chieh	1.92 m (6 ft 4 in)	92 kg (203 lb)	44 – 11 June 1982	Chinese Culture
F	13	(Taiwan)	Lin Meng-Hsueh	1.95 m (6 ft 5 in)	88 kg (194 lb)	33 – 14 October 1992	NTSU
F	14	(Taiwan)	Tsai Wen-Cheng (C)	1.90 m (6 ft 3 in)	96 kg (212 lb)	41 – 31 May 1985	NCUE
C	15	(Taiwan)	Hsieh Zong-Rong	1.99 m (6 ft 6 in)	80 kg (176 lb)	31 – 16 August 1995	NTUST
F	17	(United States)	Mike Singletary (I)	1.98 m (6 ft 6 in)	103 kg (227 lb)	37 – 19 September 1988	Texas Tech
C	21	(Taiwan)	Tseng Hsiang-Chun	2.05 m (6 ft 9 in)	95 kg (209 lb)	28 – 8 August 1998	Fu Jen
F	23	(Saint Vincent and the Grenadines)	Brendon Smart	1.98 m (6 ft 6 in)	95 kg (209 lb)	30 – 5 October 1995	Chien Hsin Tech
G	24	(Taiwan)	Jian Ting-Jhao	1.83 m (6 ft 0 in)	80.2 kg (177 lb)	28 – 16 January 1998	Chien Hsin Tech
F	29	(Taiwan)	Chang Keng-Yu	1.88 m (6 ft 2 in)	85 kg (187 lb)	30 – 16 October 1995	NTUS
C	32	(Ukraine)	Ihor Zaytsev (I)	2.11 m (6 ft 11 in)	110 kg (243 lb)	37 – 11 May 1989	Ukraine

Head coach

- (Taiwan) Hsu Chin-Che

Assistant coach(es)

- (Taiwan) Wu Yung-Jen
- (Taiwan) Lin Wei-Hao
- (Taiwan) Chiang Chih-Chen
- (Taiwan) Wei Wei

Strength & conditioning coach(es)

- (Taiwan) Jheng Wei-Syuan

Athletic trainer(s)

- (Taiwan) Lin Wu-Chang
- (Taiwan) Peng Yu-Ming (assistant)

Legend

- (C) Team captain
- (I) Import player
- Injured

- Roster
Updated: 4 January 2023

== Game log ==
=== 2023 EASL Champions Week ===
==== Group stage ====
March 1
17:00 UTC+9

Boxscore

Taipei Fubon Braves (Chinese Taipei)	69–94	(South Korea) Anyang KGC
Scoring by quarter: 19–24, 17–25, 21–22, 12–23
Pts: Ihor Zaytsev 20; Rebs: Mike Singletary 15; Asts: Mike Singletary 6		Pts: Omari Spellman 22; Rebs: Darryl Monroe 25; Asts: Darryl Monroe 7

Nikkan Arena, Utsunomiya

March 4
19:00 UTC+9

Boxscore

Ryukyu Golden Kings (Japan)	83–78	(Chinese Taipei) Taipei Fubon Braves
Scoring by quarter: 20–20, 25–25, 23–8, 15–25
Pts: Jack Cooley 24; Rebs: Jack Cooley 13; Asts: Ryuichi Kishimoto 7		Pts: Chris Johnson 28; Rebs: Chris Johnson 9 Asts: Chou, Zaytsev 4 each

Okinawa Arena, Okinawa City

=== Preseason ===
2022 preseason game log
Total: 2–0 (home: 1–0; road: 1–0)
Preseason : 2–0 (Home: 1–0; Road: 1–0)

Game	Date	Team	Score	High points	High rebounds	High assists	Location Attendance	Record
1	October 8	@Steelers	W 94–88	Tseng Hsiang-Chun (22)	Chris Johnson (11)	Lai, Singletary (5)	Fengshan Arena; 4,205	1–0
2	October 9	Kings	W 114–99	Chris Johnson (27)	Mike Singletary (14)	Mike Singletary (6)	Fengshan Arena; 3,668	2–0

2022–23 schedule

=== Regular season ===
2022–23 game log
Total: 25–15 (home: 14–6; road: 11–9)
November : 3–2 (Home: 2–0; Road: 1–2)

Game	Date	Team	Score	High points	High rebounds	High assists	Location Attendance	Record
1	November 5	Lioneers	W 102–94	Perry Jones (27)	Chris Johnson (13)	Johnson, Jones (3)	Taipei Heping Basketball Gymnasium; 7,000	1–0
2	November 6	Steelers	W 117–114	Mike Singletary (42)	Mike Singletary (12)	Chris Johnson (9)	Taipei Heping Basketball Gymnasium; 6,530	2–0
3	November 13	@Dreamers	W 108–75	Mike Singletary (25)	Chris Johnson (13)	Johnson, Lai (5)	Intercontinental Basketball Stadium; 3,000	3–0
4	November 20	@Lioneers	L 104–108 (2OT)	Chris Johnson (39)	Chris Johnson (20)	Lin Chih-Chieh (6)	Hsinchu County Stadium; 5,612	3–1
5	November 25	@Kings	L 89–104	Chris Johnson (27)	Chris Johnson (13)	Perry Jones (5)	Xinzhuang Gymnasium; 4,722	3–2

December : 4–4 (Home: 2–3; Road: 2–1)

Game	Date	Team	Score	High points	High rebounds	High assists	Location Attendance	Record
6	December 3	@Steelers	W 125–119	Chris Johnson (36)	Chris Johnson (11)	Chou Kuei-Yu (7)	Fengshan Arena; 3,306	4–2
7	December 6	@Dreamers	W 90–87	Chris Johnson (23)	Mike Singletary (18)	Chris Johnson (5)	Intercontinental Basketball Stadium; 3,000	5–2
8	December 10	Kings	L 99–103	Mike Singletary (30)	Chris Johnson (16)	Chou, Singletary (5)	Taipei Heping Basketball Gymnasium; 6,645	5–3
9	December 11	Dreamers	L 94–97	Chris Johnson (31)	Mike Singletary (13)	Mike Singletary (9)	Taipei Heping Basketball Gymnasium; 6,138	5–4
10	December 17	Steelers	W 114–80	Chris Johnson (27)	Chris Johnson (14)	Mike Singletary (8)	Taipei Heping Basketball Gymnasium; 5,208	6–4
11	December 18	Lioneers	W 114–98	Mike Singletary (32)	Chris Johnson (18)	Chou Kuei-Yu (8)	Taipei Heping Basketball Gymnasium; 5,568	7–4
12	December 23	Kings	L 101–106	Chris Johnson (23)	Chris Johnson (11)	Mike Singletary (6)	Taipei Heping Basketball Gymnasium; 6,015	7–5
13	December 25	@Pilots	L 85–90	Tseng Hsiang-Chun (26)	Mike Singletary (16)	Mike Singletary (6)	Taoyuan Arena; 3,659	7–6

January : 2–2 (Home: 2–0; Road: 0–2)

Game	Date	Team	Score	High points	High rebounds	High assists	Location Attendance	Record
14	January 1	@Kings	L 83–95	Mike Singletary (27)	Mike Singletary (11)	Jones, Singletary (5)	Xinzhuang Gymnasium; 6,540	7–7
15	January 8	@Lioneers	L 92–94	Mike Singletary (24)	Chris Johnson (20)	Chris Johnson (7)	Hsinchu County Stadium; 5,389	7–8
PPD	January 14	@Steelers	Postponed					
16	January 28	Pilots	W 86–74	Ihor Zaytsev (23)	Mike Singletary (13)	Ihor Zaytsev (3)	Taipei Heping Basketball Gymnasium; 7,000	8–8
17	January 29	Steelers	W 106–82	Johnson, Singletary (22)	Chris Johnson (18)	Chris Johnson (6)	Taipei Heping Basketball Gymnasium; 5,240	9–8

February : 7–1 (Home: 5–0; Road: 2–1)

Game	Date	Team	Score	High points	High rebounds	High assists	Location Attendance	Record
18	February 4	New Taipei Kings	W 111–109	Mike Singletary (21)	Tseng Hsiang-Chun (9)	Lai Ting-En (7)	Taipei Heping Basketball Gymnasium; 6,525	10–8
19	February 5	Formosa Taishin Dreamers	W 90–75	Chris Johnson (21)	Chris Johnson (28)	Lu Zong-Lin (6)	Taipei Heping Basketball Gymnasium; 5,604	11–8
20	February 11	@Taoyuan Pauian Pilots	W 80–78	Lin Chih-Chieh (18)	Chris Johnson (18)	Johnson, Lin C., Tsai (4)	Taoyuan Arena; 3,986	12–8
21	February 19	Taoyuan Pauian Pilots	W 86–84	Mike Singletary (18)	Mike Singletary (8)	Mike Singletary (8)	Taipei Heping Basketball Gymnasium; 6,048	13–8
22	February 21	Hsinchu JKO Lioneers	W 131–101	Chris Johnson (36)	Chris Johnson (17)	Chang T., Singletary (7)	Taipei Heping Basketball Gymnasium; 4,965	14–8
23	February 24	Formosa Taishin Dreamers	W 91–87	Lin Chih-Chieh (21)	Johnson, Zaytsev (11)	Chang T., Chou, Hung, Lin C. (3)	Taipei Heping Basketball Gymnasium; 5,126	15–8
24	February 26	@Pilots	L 80–83	Mike Singletary (23)	Singletary, Zaytsev (12)	Mike Singletary (8)	Taoyuan Arena; 3,857	15–9

March : 2–2 (Home: 1–1; Road: 1–1)

Game	Date	Team	Score	High points	High rebounds	High assists	Location Attendance	Record
25	March 10	@Steelers	L 102–103	Mike Singletary (25)	Mike Singletary (13)	Lin Chih-Chieh (5)	Fengshan Arena; 5,321	15–10
26	March 12	@Kings	W 106–95	Mike Singletary (38)	Mike Singletary (15)	Chang T., Lai, Lin C. (4)	Xinzhuang Gymnasium; 4,257	16–10
27	March 18	Kings	L 90–97	Mike Singletary (25)	Mike Singletary (12)	Lin Chih-Chieh (6)	Taipei Heping Basketball Gymnasium; 6,862	16–11
28	March 19	Lioneers	W 112–99	Ihor Zaytsev (26)	Chris Johnson (10)	Tsai Wen-Cheng (5)	Taipei Heping Basketball Gymnasium; 6,088	17–11
29	March 25	@Steelers	W 101–95	Jian, Singletary (19)	Ihor Zaytsev (12)	Ihor Zaytsev (7)	Fengshan Arena; 5,321	18–11

April : 4–3 (Home: 1–1; Road: 3–2)

Game	Date	Team	Score	High points	High rebounds	High assists	Location Attendance	Record
30	April 1	@Dreamers	W 100–96	Mike Singletary (25)	Ihor Zaytsev (19)	Tseng Hsiang-Chun (5)	Intercontinental Basketball Stadium; 3,000	19–11
31	April 4	@Pilots	W 77–74	Chang Tsung-Hsien (21)	Mike Singletary (15)	Chang Tsung-Hsien (4)	Taoyuan Arena; 3,356	20–11
32	April 9	@Steelers	L 105–106	Mike Singletary (24)	Singletary, Smart (8)	Chou Kuei-Yu (6)	Fengshan Arena; 5,321	20–12
33	April 15	@Kings	W 89–68	Chris Johnson (17)	Ihor Zaytsev (14)	Lai Ting-En (6)	Xinzhuang Gymnasium; 4,826	21–12
34	April 22	Dreamers	W 100–96	Mike Singletary (23)	Singletary, Tseng (10)	Chang Tsung-Hsien (4)	Taipei Heping Basketball Gymnasium; 6,130	22–12
35	April 23	Pilots	L 86–95	Ihor Zaytsev (21)	Ihor Zaytsev (11)	Lu Zong-Lin (4)	Taipei Heping Basketball Gymnasium; 5,732	22–13
36	April 29	@Dreamers	L 89–107	Mike Singletary (18)	Chris Johnson (12)	Johnson, Singletary (5)	Intercontinental Basketball Stadium; 3,000	22–14

May : 3–1 (Home: 1–1; Road: 2–0)

Game	Date	Team	Score	High points	High rebounds	High assists	Location Attendance	Record
37	May 1	@Lioneers	W 114–87	Ihor Zaytsev (23)	Chris Johnson (17)	Jian Ting-Jhao (7)	Hsinchu County Stadium; 5,006	23–14
38	May 6	Steelers	L 103–120	Chris Johnson (22)	Chris Johnson (12)	Chris Johnson (6)	Taipei Heping Basketball Gymnasium; 7,000	23–15
39	May 7	Pilots	W 97–93	Hung Kai-Chieh (22)	Chris Johnson (14)	Lai, Zaytsev (6)	Taipei Heping Basketball Gymnasium; 5,828	24–15
40	May 14	@Lioneers	W 94–88	Mike Singletary (18)	Chris Johnson (18)	Chris Johnson (7)	Hsinchu County Stadium; 5,376	25–15

2022–23 schedule

=== Playoffs ===
2023 playoffs game log
Total: 7–2 (home: 4–1; road: 3–1)
Playoffs : 3–0 (Home: 2–0; Road: 1–0)

Game	Date	Team	Score	High points	High rebounds	High assists	Location Attendance	Record
1	May 20	Pilots	W 94–76	Chang T., Singletary (16)	Singletary, Zaytsev (10)	Ihor Zaytsev (6)	Taipei Heping Basketball Gymnasium; 6,825	1–0
2	May 22	Pilots	W 83–74	Mike Singletary (28)	Mike Singletary (8)	Ihor Zaytsev (5)	Taipei Heping Basketball Gymnasium; 6,168	2–0
3	May 26	@Pilots	W 101–89	Lin Chih-Chieh (29)	Ihor Zaytsev (12)	Ihor Zaytsev (5)	Taoyuan Arena; 5,155	3–0

Finals : 4–2 (Home: 2–1; Road: 2–1)

Game	Date	Team	Score	High points	High rebounds	High assists	Location Attendance	Record
1	June 3	@Kings	L 72–86	Ihor Zaytsev (20)	Mike Singletary (12)	Chang T., Jian, Singletary (3)	Xinzhuang Gymnasium; 6,540	0–1
2	June 5	@Kings	W 87–83	Ihor Zaytsev (20)	Johnson, Zaytsev (11)	Chang Tsung-Hsien (4)	Xinzhuang Gymnasium; 6,540	1–1
3	June 8	Kings	W 97–91	Chris Johnson (29)	Chris Johnson (23)	Chang Tsung-Hsien (3)	Taipei Heping Basketball Gymnasium; 7,000	2–1
4	June 10	Kings	L 97–107	Chou Kuei-Yu (19)	Mike Singletary (13)	Mike Singletary (8)	Taipei Heping Basketball Gymnasium; 7,000	2–2
5	June 12	@Kings	W 111–105	Ihor Zaytsev (33)	Chris Johnson (11)	Lin Chih-Chieh (7)	Xinzhuang Gymnasium; 6,540	3–2
6	June 14	Kings	W 118–104	Chris Johnson (27)	Chris Johnson (9)	Lin Chih-Chieh (7)	Taipei Heping Basketball Gymnasium; 7,000	4–2

2022–23 schedule

== Player statistics ==
Legend
GP	Games played	MPG	Minutes per game	2P%	2-point field goal percentage
3P%	3-point field goal percentage	FT%	Free throw percentage	RPG	Rebounds per game
APG	Assists per game	SPG	Steals per game	BPG	Blocks per game
PPG	Points per game		Led the league

=== Regular season ===
Player	GP	MPG	PPG	2P%	3P%	FT%	RPG	APG	SPG	BPG
Chang Keng-Yu	8	05:07	2.25	66.67%	25.00%	87.50%	0.63	0.00	0.13	0.00
Chang Tsung-Hsien	33	25:36	10.18	40.36%	21.69%	73.68%	2.30	2.85	0.91	0.12
Chen Fan Po-Yen	20	09:10	3.95	48.57%	30.77%	90.00%	1.85	0.25	0.25	0.10
Chou Kuei-Yu	38	21:27	6.89	51.80%	34.67%	71.43%	2.26	2.79	0.87	0.18
Steven Guinchard	10	08:08	2.20	40.00%	28.57%	0.00%	1.10	0.10	0.40	0.00
Hsieh Zong-Rong	35	11:19	2.51	44.00%	0.00%	70.97%	2.17	0.34	0.26	0.31
Hung Kai-Chieh	40	20:59	6.93	41.38%	41.33%	67.86%	2.78	2.03	1.00	0.25
Jian Ting-Jhao	25	13:44	5.56	46.75%	33.33%	72.73%	1.28	1.48	0.12	0.04
Chris Johnson	27	38:14	21.48	58.87%	42.11%	78.05%	14.52	4.00	1.56	2.15
Perry Jones	4	32:53	10.75	47.83%	22.73%	66.67%	6.50	4.00	0.75	1.25
Lai Ting-En	38	14:16	3.97	41.10%	27.08%	81.25%	1.63	2.08	1.05	0.03
Lin Chih-Chieh	29	20:45	7.69	48.72%	27.41%	70.59%	3.52	3.03	0.69	0.03
Lin Meng-Hsueh	26	07:19	1.88	45.45%	44.44%	38.89%	1.15	0.50	0.04	0.08
Lu Zong-Lin	10	07:31	1.00	28.57%	50.00%	0.00%	1.00	1.70	0.20	0.00
Mike Singletary	28	38:13	23.29	49.81%	32.35%	78.95%	11.07	4.71	1.64	0.61
Brendon Smart	31	12:05	4.42	41.33%	28.95%	64.29%	2.68	0.32	0.39	0.13
Tsai Wen-Cheng	39	11:42	4.41	48.12%	20.45%	68.00%	2.21	0.92	0.41	0.03
Tseng Hsiang-Chun	33	26:31	11.15	50.21%	29.69%	73.40%	5.82	1.18	0.94	1.09
Ihor Zaytsev	21	35:57	16.05	54.88%	43.21%	65.82%	9.48	2.48	0.86	1.00

=== Playoffs ===
Player	GP	MPG	PPG	2P%	3P%	FT%	RPG	APG	SPG	BPG
Chang Keng-Yu	Did not play									
Chang Tsung-Hsien	3	27:55	14.67	50.00%	25.00%	72.73%	1.67	3.00	0.67	0.33
Chen Fan Po-Yen	Did not play									
Chou Kuei-Yu	3	21:39	4.00	44.44%	20.00%	50.00%	4.00	2.33	1.00	0.33
Steven Guinchard	Did not play									
Hsieh Zong-Rong	2	02:29	0.00	0.00%	0.00%	0.00%	0.00	0.00	0.00	0.00
Hung Kai-Chieh	3	18:57	5.00	50.00%	27.27%	100.00%	3.00	1.33	0.00	0.00
Jian Ting-Jhao	3	15:23	4.67	44.44%	14.29%	100.00%	1.67	1.00	0.00	0.00
Chris Johnson	1	28:05	16.00	40.00%	40.00%	100.00%	11.00	1.00	0.00	2.00
Lai Ting-En	2	07:39	4.00	50.00%	50.00%	0.00%	0.50	0.50	0.50	0.00
Lin Chih-Chieh	3	26:56	12.33	66.67%	28.57%	100.00%	7.00	1.67	0.67	0.00
Lin Meng-Hsueh	2	01:05	0.00	0.00%	0.00%	0.00%	1.00	0.50	0.00	0.00
Lu Zong-Lin	Did not play									
Mike Singletary	2	30:27	22.00	70.00%	46.67%	75.00%	9.00	3.50	0.50	0.50
Brendon Smart	3	07:09	1.67	50.00%	0.00%	75.00%	2.67	1.33	0.33	0.00
Tsai Wen-Cheng	3	11:02	1.67	11.11%	20.00%	0.00%	3.67	1.33	0.00	0.00
Tseng Hsiang-Chun	3	29:47	12.67	60.00%	40.00%	33.33%	2.67	0.00	0.67	1.33
Ihor Zaytsev	3	44:00	13.33	55.56%	41.67%	83.33%	9.67	5.33	0.67	1.00

=== Finals ===
Player	GP	MPG	PPG	2P%	3P%	FT%	RPG	APG	SPG	BPG
Chang Keng-Yu	Did not play									
Chang Tsung-Hsien	6	28:34	10.83	35.19%	25.00%	100.00%	3.50	2.83	0.67	0.33
Chen Fan Po-Yen	1	02:26	0.00	0.00%	0.00%	0.00%	0.00	0.00	0.00	0.00
Chou Kuei-Yu	6	27:53	9.50	60.00%	26.32%	0.00%	3.17	2.00	1.67	0.00
Steven Guinchard	5	09:31	2.60	33.33%	27.27%	0.00%	1.00	0.40	0.80	0.00
Hsieh Zong-Rong	1	01:21	0.00	0.00%	0.00%	0.00%	0.00	0.00	0.00	0.00
Hung Kai-Chieh	6	18:35	5.83	36.36%	40.00%	100.00%	1.67	1.00	1.00	0.17
Jian Ting-Jhao	6	15:32	5.50	38.89%	25.00%	83.33%	2.17	1.67	0.17	0.00
Chris Johnson	4	34:02	23.25	65.12%	42.11%	81.25%	13.50	2.00	1.75	2.00
Lai Ting-En	6	07:46	1.33	33.33%	0.00%	100.00%	1.50	1.17	0.33	0.00
Lin Chih-Chieh	6	32:08	15.33	73.53%	23.08%	68.18%	4.50	3.67	1.17	0.00
Lin Meng-Hsueh	2	03:11	0.00	0.00%	0.00%	0.00%	0.50	0.00	0.00	0.00
Lu Zong-Lin	Did not play									
Mike Singletary	2	41:02	10.50	50.00%	6.25%	66.67%	12.50	5.50	2.50	1.50
Brendon Smart	1	09:20	3.00	0.00%	100.00%	0.00%	3.00	0.00	1.00	0.00
Tsai Wen-Cheng	3	11:47	6.67	50.00%	50.00%	50.00%	2.00	1.00	0.33	0.00
Tseng Hsiang-Chun	6	15:59	4.67	52.63%	33.33%	71.43%	3.50	0.33	0.17	1.00
Ihor Zaytsev	6	40:01	19.00	62.90%	33.33%	64.29%	7.50	2.33	1.00	1.00

== Transactions ==
=== Trades ===
August 8, 2022
To Taipei Fubon Braves

- Steven Guinchard
- Hung Kai-Chieh
- 2024 protected first-round pick
To New Taipei Kings

- Joseph Lin

=== Free agency ===
==== Re-signed ====
Date	Player	Contract terms	Ref.
July 18, 2022	Brendon Smart	3-year contract, worth unknown	
July 25, 2022	Mike Singletary	—N/a	
August 25, 2022	Ihor Zaytsev	—N/a	
September 2, 2022	Tsai Wen-Cheng	3-year contract, worth unknown	
September 7, 2022	Lin Chih-Chieh	2-year contract, worth unknown	
October 23, 2022	Perry Jones	—N/a	

==== Additions ====
Date	Player	Contract terms	Former team	Ref.
August 15, 2022	Hsieh Zong-Rong	2-year contract, worth unknown	Bank of Taiwan	
August 22, 2022	Chris Johnson	—N/a	(New Zealand) Auckland Tuatara	
August 26, 2022	Chen Fan Po-Yen	2+1-year contract, worth unknown	UCH	
August 26, 2022	Jian Ting-Jhao	2+1-year contract, worth unknown	UCH	
September 1, 2022	Lu Zong-Lin	2-year contract, worth unknown	Kaohsiung Jeoutai Technology	
September 8, 2022	Sedrick Barefield	EASL contract, worth unknown	(United States) Oklahoma City Blue	

==== Subtractions ====
Date	Player	Reason	New team	Ref.
August 30, 2022	Chien Wei-Ju	contract terminated	Tainan TSG GhostHawks	
September 22, 2022	Tseng Wen-Ting	contract expired	New Taipei CTBC DEA	
October 11, 2022	Sedrick Barefield	mutually agreed to part ways	Tainan TSG GhostHawks	
January 4, 2023	Perry Jones	mutually agreed to part ways	TaiwanBeer HeroBears	

== Awards ==
=== Finals awards ===
Recipient	Award	Ref.
Taipei Fubon Braves	2023 PLG Champion	
Chris Johnson	Finals Most Valuable Player	

=== End-of-season awards ===
Recipient	Award	Ref.
Mike Singletary	Points Leader	
Lin Chih-Chieh	Mr. Popular	
Fubon Angels	PLG Cheerleader Squad of the Year	
Tseng Hsiang-Chun	All-Defensive Team	
Tseng Hsiang-Chun	Most Improved Player	
Tseng Hsiang-Chun	All-PLG Team	

=== Players of the Week ===
Week	Recipient	Date awarded	Ref.
Week 1	Mike Singletary	November 5 - November 6	
Week 2	Chris Johnson	November 12 - November 13	
Week 7	Tseng Hsiang-Chun	December 17 - December 20	
Week 13	Ihor Zaytsev	January 28 - January 31	
