= 2022–23 Hsinchu JKO Lioneers season =

Taiwanese professional basketball season

Hsinchu JKO Lioneers
2022–23 season
- President: Hu Lung-Chih
- General Manager: ~~Hu Lung-Chih~~ (resigned)
- Head Coach: Lin Kuan-Lun
- Arena: Hsinchu County Stadium
- P. League+: 13–27 (.325)
- Playoffs: Did not qualify.
- Scoring leader: William Artino (19.57)
- Rebounding leader: William Artino (15.00)
- Assists leader: Kao Kuo-Hao (4.33)
- Highest home attendance: 8,000 (February 25, 2023)
- Lowest home attendance: 3,517 (December 27, 2022)
- Average home attendance: 4,943
- Biggest win: Lioneers 98–73 Kings (April 2, 2023)
- Biggest defeat: Lioneers 60–103 Pilots (December 24, 2022)
- All statistics correct as of May 18, 2023.

The 2022–23 Hsinchu JKO Lioneers season was the franchise's 3rd season, its third season in the P. LEAGUE+ (PLG), its 3rd in Hsinchu County. The Lioneers are coached by Lin Kuan-Lun in his third year as head coach. On July 26, 2022, the Lioneers announced that Kenny Kao has resigned from general manager and named president Hu Lung-Chih as the new general manager.

== Draft ==
| Round | Pick | Player | Position | Status | School/club team |
|---|---|---|---|---|---|
| 1 | 5 | Ifeanyi Eboka | F | Foreign student | SHU |
| 2 | 10 | Tseng Po-Yu | G | Local | MDU |

== Standings ==
| Pos | Team | W | L | PCT | GB | Qualification |
|---|---|---|---|---|---|---|
| 1 | New Taipei Kings | 27 | 13 | .675 | — | Playoffs |
| 2 | Taipei Fubon Braves | 25 | 15 | .625 | 2 | Playoffs |
| 3 | Taoyuan Pauian Pilots | 19 | 21 | .475 | 8 | Playoffs |
| 4 | Formosa Taishin Dreamers | 19 | 21 | .475 | 8 | Playoffs |
| 5 | Kaohsiung 17LIVE Steelers | 17 | 23 | .425 | 10 | |
| 6 | Hsinchu JKO Lioneers | 13 | 27 | .325 | 14 | |

Updated to match(es) played on May 14, 2023. Source: P.League+

== Roster ==
Note: Flags indicate national team eligibility at FIBA-sanctioned events. Players may hold other non-FIBA nationalities not displayed.

2022–23 Hsinchu JKO Lioneers roster
Players
Coaches

| Pos. | No. | Nat. | Name | Ht. | Wt. | Age | From |
|---|---|---|---|---|---|---|---|
| G | 2 | (Taiwan) | Chiang Kuang-Chien | 1.84 m (6 ft 0 in) | 81 kg (179 lb) | 27 – 7 May 1998 | NTUA |
| C | 3 | (United States) | Jeremy Tyler (I) | 2.08 m (6 ft 10 in) | 113 kg (249 lb) | 34 – 21 June 1991 | San Diego HS |
| G | 4 | (Taiwan) | Kao Kuo-Hao (C) | 1.79 m (5 ft 10 in) | 76 kg (168 lb) | 26 – 22 September 1998 | Southeast Missouri State |
| G | 5 | (Taiwan) | Sung Yu-Hsuan | 1.84 m (6 ft 0 in) | 80 kg (176 lb) | 35 – 5 December 1989 | Chinese Culture |
| G | 7 | (Taiwan) | Tseng Po-Yu | 1.86 m (6 ft 1 in) | 89 kg (196 lb) | 28 – 3 December 1996 | MingDao |
| F | 8 | (Taiwan) | Chu Yun-Hao | 1.94 m (6 ft 4 in) | 90 kg (198 lb) | 27 – 3 November 1997 | Chien Hsin Tech |
| G | 9 | (Taiwan) | Tien Hao | 1.73 m (5 ft 8 in) | 68 kg (150 lb) | 26 – 16 September 1998 | NCCU |
| F | 11 | (Taiwan) | Hsiao Hsun-Yi | 1.92 m (6 ft 4 in) | 82 kg (181 lb) | 32 – 23 October 1992 | NTUA |
| F | 12 | (Taiwan) | Lee Chia-Jui | 2.00 m (6 ft 7 in) | 86 kg (190 lb) | 30 – 4 December 1994 | KLCIVS |
| F | 13 | (Canada) | Anthony Bennett (I) | 2.03 m (6 ft 8 in) | 111 kg (245 lb) | 32 – 14 March 1993 | UNLV |
| F | 21 | (Nigeria) | Ifeanyi Eboka | 1.98 m (6 ft 6 in) | 104 kg (229 lb) | 25 – 29 June 2000 | SHU |
| G | 23 | (Taiwan) | Lu Chi-Min | 1.88 m (6 ft 2 in) | 87 kg (192 lb) | 35 – 27 October 1989 | NTUS |
| F | 24 | (Taiwan) | Kuo Shao-Chieh | 1.90 m (6 ft 3 in) | 80 kg (176 lb) | 35 – 9 April 1990 | TNU |
| G | 26 | (Taiwan) | Chen Tse-Yu | 1.90 m (6 ft 3 in) | 80 kg (176 lb) | 34 – 12 May 1991 | NTUA |
| C | 31 | (United States) (Taiwan) | Will Artino (I) | 2.11 m (6 ft 11 in) | 100 kg (220 lb) | 33 – 27 June 1992 | Creighton |

Head coach

- (Taiwan) Lin Kuan-Lun

Assistant coach(es)

- (Taiwan) Chen Tse-Yu
- (Taiwan) Huang Sheng-Fu
- (Republic of Ireland) Sean Kilmartin
- (Taiwan) Seng Hsin-Han

Athletic trainer(s)

- (Taiwan) Huang Chien-Yuan
- (Taiwan) Ou Po-Hung

Team manager

- (Taiwan) Chang Yun-Sheng

Legend

- (C) Team captain
- (DP) Development player
- (I) Import player
- Injured

- Roster
Updated: 17 March 2023

== Game log ==
=== Interleague play ===
September 17
1:00pm

boxscore

| Taiwan Beer | 90–97 (OT) | Hsinchu JKO Lioneers |
Scoring by quarter: 18–15, 22–28, 26–16, 16–23, Overtime: 8–15
| Pts: Humphery Gabriel 22; Rebs: Humphery Gabriel 11; Asts: Humphery Gabriel 6 | | Pts: Ifeanyi Eboka 19; Rebs: Ifeanyi Eboka 15; Asts: Lin Yi-Huei 4 |

Taipei Heping Basketball Gymnasium, Taipei City
Referees: Lin Yuan-Tien, Huang Po-Wei, Yen Shih-Hsuan

September 19
5:00pm

boxscore

| Hsinchu JKO Lioneers | 68–76 | New Taipei CTBC DEA |
Scoring by quarter: 10–19, 14–22, 19–26, 25–9
| Pts: Chu Yun-Hao 14; Rebs: Ifeanyi Eboka 11; Asts: Lin Ming-Yi 4 | | Pts: Al Bachir 28; Rebs: Jonah Morrison 12; Asts: Al Bachir 4 |

Taipei Heping Basketball Gymnasium, Taipei City

September 20
7:00pm

boxscore

| Bank of Taiwan | 87–86 | Hsinchu JKO Lioneers |
Scoring by quarter: 12–20, 22–29, 23–19, 30–18
| Pts: Chen You-Hsu 21; Rebs: Chen You-Hsu 13; Asts: Chang Chia-He 5 | | Pts: Ifeanyi Eboka 19; Rebs: Ifeanyi Eboka 8 Asts: Kao Kuo-Hao 5 |

Taipei Heping Basketball Gymnasium, Taipei City

September 22
5:00pm

boxscore

| Taoyuan Leopards | 69–87 | Hsinchu JKO Lioneers |
Scoring by quarter: 20–21, 16–18, 10–30, 23–18
| Pts: Cheng Wei 26; Rebs: Liu Yuan-Kai 8 Asts: Cheng, Lu 3 each | | Pts: Ifeanyi Eboka 18; Rebs: Ifeanyi Eboka 10; Asts: Tseng Po-Yu 6 |

Taipei Heping Basketball Gymnasium, Taipei City

September 23
3:00pm

boxscore

| Hsinchu JKO Lioneers | 80–59 | Taichung Suns |
Scoring by quarter: 22–15, 18–14, 12–18, 28–12
| Pts: Kuo Shao-Chieh 23; Rebs: Kao Kuo-Hao 12; Asts: Kao, Lin M. 7 each | | Pts: Bayasgalan Delgerchuluun 19; Rebs: Sun Szu-Yao 8 Asts: Chang Chia-Jung 3 |

Taipei Heping Basketball Gymnasium, Taipei City
Referees: Huang Chen-Feng, Chen Chao-Ying, Hsieh Chieh-Lung

==== Quarterfinals ====
September 25
3:00pm

boxscore

| Chinese Taipei National Training Team | 95–79 | Hsinchu JKO Lioneers |
Scoring by quarter: 31–17, 22–24, 23–16, 19–22
| Pts: Will Artino 26; Rebs: Will Artino 8 Asts: Kao Chin-Wei 9 | | Pts: Tseng Po-Yu 16; Rebs: Ifeanyi Eboka 9 Asts: Kuo, Tseng 3 each |

Taipei Heping Basketball Gymnasium, Taipei City
Referees: Huang Yung-Chu, Huang Yu-Ming, Hsieh Chieh-Lung

=== Preseason ===
2022 preseason game log
Total: 1–1 (Home: 0–1; Road: 1–0)
Preseason : 1–1 (Home: 0–1; Road: 1–0)

| Game | Date | Team | Score | High points | High rebounds | High assists | Location Attendance | Record |
|---|---|---|---|---|---|---|---|---|
| 1 | October 8 | Dreamers | L 100–115 | Will Artino (20) | Anthony Bennett (10) | Kao Kuo-Hao (7) | Fengshan Arena; 4,205 | 0–1 |
| 2 | October 10 | @Steelers | W 111–102 | Will Artino (24) | Anthony Bennett (13) | Kao Kuo-Hao (6) | Fengshan Arena; 3,306 | 1–1 |

2022–23 schedule

=== Regular season ===
2022–23 game log
Total: 13–27 (Home: 10–10; Road: 3–17)
November : 3–2 (Home: 2–0; Road: 1–2)

| Game | Date | Team | Score | High points | High rebounds | High assists | Location Attendance | Record |
|---|---|---|---|---|---|---|---|---|
| 1 | November 5 | @Braves | L 94–102 | Sim Bhullar (28) | Sim Bhullar (17) | Tien Hao (7) | Taipei Heping Basketball Gymnasium; 7,000 | 0–1 |
| 2 | November 13 | @Kings | L 78–113 | Terrico White (22) | Sim Bhullar (14) | Terrico White (4) | Xinzhuang Gymnasium; 4,163 | 0–2 |
| 3 | November 19 | Steelers | W 89–83 | Terrico White (24) | Will Artino (16) | Terrico White (7) | Hsinchu County Stadium; 5,238 | 1–2 |
| 4 | November 20 | Braves | W 108–104 (2OT) | Sim Bhullar (22) | Sim Bhullar (18) | Kao Kuo-Hao (6) | Hsinchu County Stadium; 5,612 | 2–2 |
| 5 | November 29 | @Steelers | W 102–101 | Sim Bhullar (29) | Sim Bhullar (15) | Tien Hao (11) | Fengshan Arena; 2,505 | 3–2 |

December : 3–4 (Home: 3–1; Road: 0–3)

| Game | Date | Team | Score | High points | High rebounds | High assists | Location Attendance | Record |
|---|---|---|---|---|---|---|---|---|
| 6 | December 3 | Dreamers | W 82–77 | Will Artino (18) | Will Artino (17) | Will Artino (5) | Hsinchu County Stadium; 4,748 | 4–2 |
| 7 | December 4 | Pilots | L 80–94 | Terrico White (22) | Sim Bhullar (14) | Terrico White (4) | Hsinchu County Stadium; 4,062 | 4–3 |
| 8 | December 10 | @Pilots | L 79–102 | Tien Hao (24) | Sim Bhullar (12) | Tien Hao (6) | Taoyuan Arena; 3,286 | 4–4 |
| 9 | December 18 | @Braves | L 98–114 | Terrico White (34) | Will Artino (15) | Lee, Tien, Tseng (4) | Taipei Heping Basketball Gymnasium; 5,568 | 4–5 |
| 10 | December 24 | @Pilots | L 60–103 | Will Artino (20) | Will Artino (10) | Kao Kuo-Hao (3) | Taoyuan Arena; 2,658 | 4–6 |
| 11 | December 27 | Steelers | W 109–85 | Terrico White (28) | Will Artino (22) | Kao Kuo-Hao (5) | Hsinchu County Stadium; 3,517 | 5–6 |
| 12 | December 31 | Dreamers | W 102–97 | Kao Kuo-Hao (34) | Will Artino (16) | Will Artino (7) | Hsinchu County Stadium; 5,247 | 6–6 |

January : 3–4 (Home: 3–2; Road: 0–2)

| Game | Date | Team | Score | High points | High rebounds | High assists | Location Attendance | Record |
|---|---|---|---|---|---|---|---|---|
| 13 | January 1 | Pilots | L 90–105 | Anthony Bennett (24) | Anthony Bennett (11) | Tien Hao (8) | Hsinchu County Stadium; 4,574 | 6–7 |
| 14 | January 7 | Kings | L 85–101 | Terrico White (16) | Will Artino (20) | Kao Kuo-Hao (4) | Hsinchu County Stadium; 4,177 | 6–8 |
| 15 | January 8 | Braves | W 94–92 | Anthony Bennett (27) | Anthony Bennett (17) | Bennett, Kao (6) | Hsinchu County Stadium; 5,389 | 7–8 |
| 16 | January 13 | Dreamers | W 87–80 | Anthony Bennett (28) | Artino, Bennett (15) | Kao Kuo-Hao (10) | Hsinchu County Stadium; 3,914 | 8–8 |
| 17 | January 14 | Kings | W 107–106 | Anthony Bennett (35) | Anthony Bennett (12) | Lee Chia-Jui (5) | Hsinchu County Stadium; 4,694 | 9–8 |
| 18 | January 28 | @Dreamers | L 99–123 | Will Artino (19) | Will Artino (10) | Bennett, Tseng (4) | Intercontinental Basketball Stadium; 3,000 | 9–9 |
| 19 | January 31 | @Pilots | L 70–88 | Anthony Bennett (30) | Anthony Bennett (17) | Tseng Po-Yu (6) | Taoyuan Arena; 2,688 | 9–10 |

February : 1–6 (Home: 1–4; Road: 0–2)

| Game | Date | Team | Score | High points | High rebounds | High assists | Location Attendance | Record |
|---|---|---|---|---|---|---|---|---|
| 20 | February 5 | Steelers | W 89–86 | Anthony Bennett (33) | Anthony Bennett (13) | Will Artino (7) | Hsinchu County Stadium; 5,582 | 10–10 |
| 21 | February 7 | Pilots | L 92–106 | Anthony Bennett (22) | Anthony Bennett (9) | Bennett, Hsiao, White (3) | Hsinchu County Stadium; 3,560 | 10–11 |
| 22 | February 12 | @Pilots | L 81–95 | Anthony Bennett (26) | Anthony Bennett (15) | Ifeanyi Eboka (3) | Taoyuan Arena; 2,367 | 10–12 |
| 23 | February 19 | Kings | L 85–102 | Anthony Bennett (33) | Anthony Bennett (23) | Anthony Bennett (5) | Hsinchu County Stadium; 5,597 | 10–13 |
| 24 | February 21 | @Braves | L 101–131 | Terrico White (25) | Anthony Bennett (8) | Terrico White (8) | Taipei Heping Basketball Gymnasium; 4,965 | 10–14 |
| 25 | February 25 | Steelers | L 82–95 | Terrico White (25) | Will Artino (15) | Artino, Hsiao (4) | Hsinchu County Stadium; 8,000 | 10–15 |
| 26 | February 26 | Dreamers | L 94–100 | Terrico White (28) | Will Artino (14) | Will Artino (5) | Hsinchu County Stadium; 4,527 | 10–16 |

March : 1–3 (Home: 0–0; Road: 1–3)

| Game | Date | Team | Score | High points | High rebounds | High assists | Location Attendance | Record |
|---|---|---|---|---|---|---|---|---|
| 27 | March 5 | @Dreamers | L 93–111 | Anthony Bennett (23) | Will Artino (17) | Tien Hao (6) | Intercontinental Basketball Stadium; 3,000 | 10–17 |
| 28 | March 11 | @Steelers | W 85–76 | Will Artino (22) | Will Artino (28) | Jeremy Tyler (3) | Fengshan Arena; 5,127 | 11–17 |
| 29 | March 19 | @Braves | L 99–112 | Will Artino (42) | Will Artino (17) | Kao Kuo-Hao (6) | Taipei Heping Basketball Gymnasium; 6,088 | 11–18 |
| 30 | March 26 | @Dreamers | L 103–116 | Jeremy Tyler (32) | Jeremy Tyler (16) | Kao Kuo-Hao (6) | Intercontinental Basketball Stadium; 2,526 | 11–19 |

April : 1–4 (Home: 0–0; Road: 1–4)

| Game | Date | Team | Score | High points | High rebounds | High assists | Location Attendance | Record |
|---|---|---|---|---|---|---|---|---|
| 31 | April 2 | @Kings | W 98–73 | Jeremy Tyler (40) | Lee Chia-Jui (15) | Kao Kuo-Hao (7) | Xinzhuang Gymnasium; 2,875 | 12–19 |
| 32 | April 8 | @Steelers | L 103–112 | Kao Kuo-Hao (29) | Will Artino (19) | Tien Hao (5) | Fengshan Arena; 4,321 | 12–20 |
| 33 | April 15 | @Dreamers | L 85–89 | Will Artino (24) | Will Artino (15) | Will Artino (5) | Intercontinental Basketball Stadium; 2,659 | 12–21 |
| 34 | April 22 | @Steelers | L 88–113 | Sung Yu-Hsuan (20) | Kao Kuo-Hao (12) | Kao Kuo-Hao (11) | Fengshan Arena; 4,892 | 12–22 |
| 35 | April 29 | @Kings | L 91–103 | Anthony Bennett (27) | Will Artino (17) | Kao Kuo-Hao (7) | Xinzhuang Gymnasium; 3,544 | 12–23 |

May : 1–4 (Home: 1–3; Road: 0–1)

| Game | Date | Team | Score | High points | High rebounds | High assists | Location Attendance | Record |
|---|---|---|---|---|---|---|---|---|
| 36 | May 1 | Braves | L 87–114 | Bennett, Kao (20) | Will Artino (21) | Anthony Bennett (4) | Hsinchu County Stadium; 5,006 | 12–24 |
| 37 | May 5 | Pilots | L 78–89 | Kuo Shao-Chieh (14) | Will Artino (15) | Chiang, Lu (4) | Hsinchu County Stadium; 4,010 | 12–25 |
| PPD | May 7 | @Kings | Postponed | | | | | |
| 38 | May 9 | @Kings | L 95–104 | Kao Kuo-Hao (22) | Anthony Bennett (11) | Anthony Bennett (5) | Xinzhuang Gymnasium; 2,962 | 12–26 |
| 39 | May 13 | Kings | W 110–95 | Jeremy Tyler (28) | Jeremy Tyler (26) | Kao Kuo-Hao (10) | Hsinchu County Stadium; 6,023 | 13–26 |
| 40 | May 14 | Braves | L 88–94 | Artino, Kao (18) | Will Artino (17) | Kao Kuo-Hao (5) | Hsinchu County Stadium; 5,376 | 13–27 |

2022–23 schedule

== Player statistics ==
Legend
| GP | Games played | MPG | Minutes per game | 2P% | 2-point field goal percentage |
| 3P% | 3-point field goal percentage | FT% | Free throw percentage | RPG | Rebounds per game |
| APG | Assists per game | SPG | Steals per game | BPG | Blocks per game |
| PPG | Points per game | | Led the league |

=== Regular season ===
| Player | GP | MPG | PPG | 2P% | 3P% | FT% | RPG | APG | SPG | BPG |
|---|---|---|---|---|---|---|---|---|---|---|
| Will Artino | 28 | 37:19 | 19.57 | 48.31% | 20.69% | 46.59% | 15.00 | 3.32 | 1.79 | 0.86 |
| Anthony Bennett | 17 | 39:42 | 22.59 | 51.06% | 33.14% | 75.82% | 12.24 | 2.88 | 3.29 | 0.65 |
| Sim Bhullar | 6 | 34:31 | 18.33 | 63.38% | 0.00% | 38.46% | 15.00 | 1.00 | 0.50 | 1.50 |
| Chen Tse-Yu | 4 | 05:20 | 2.25 | 40.00% | 33.33% | 50.00% | 0.25 | 0.50 | 0.00 | 0.00 |
| Chiang Kuang-Chien | 19 | 09:44 | 1.84 | 40.00% | 17.65% | 66.67% | 0.47 | 0.42 | 0.16 | 0.16 |
| Chu Yun-Hao | 27 | 27:21 | 8.07 | 48.65% | 34.40% | 58.62% | 2.04 | 1.56 | 0.85 | 0.11 |
| Ifeanyi Eboka | 36 | 15:54 | 5.28 | 43.82% | 18.18% | 46.67% | 4.50 | 0.58 | 0.67 | 0.58 |
| Hsiao Shun-Yi | 30 | 25:53 | 9.13 | 51.58% | 29.63% | 62.79% | 4.63 | 1.43 | 1.20 | 0.37 |
| Kao Kuo-Hao | 30 | 37:13 | 14.93 | 41.04% | 36.67% | 79.75% | 4.23 | 4.33 | 1.60 | 0.07 |
| Kuo Shao-Chieh | 37 | 14:00 | 3.97 | 46.94% | 26.32% | 74.29% | 1.38 | 0.59 | 0.46 | 0.00 |
| Lee Chia-Jui | 37 | 15:11 | 4.86 | 35.51% | 31.18% | 56.67% | 2.84 | 1.05 | 0.38 | 0.27 |
| Lin Ming-Yi | 9 | 11:12 | 1.44 | 50.00% | 11.11% | 50.00% | 0.89 | 1.00 | 0.78 | 0.11 |
| Lin Yi-Huei | 7 | 16:20 | 3.43 | 25.00% | 31.25% | 33.33% | 1.00 | 1.71 | 0.29 | 0.14 |
| Lu Chi-Min | 30 | 09:17 | 1.20 | 25.00% | 13.64% | 42.86% | 1.03 | 0.67 | 0.27 | 0.03 |
| Sung Yu-Hsuan | 23 | 09:53 | 3.74 | 55.71% | 0.00% | 88.89% | 1.09 | 0.74 | 0.13 | 0.00 |
| Tien Hao | 28 | 24:18 | 6.07 | 47.73% | 32.35% | 74.07% | 2.04 | 3.50 | 1.04 | 0.11 |
| Tseng Po-Yu | 38 | 21:24 | 5.42 | 41.09% | 25.68% | 69.35% | 1.66 | 1.53 | 0.58 | 0.00 |
| Jeremy Tyler | 11 | 31:34 | 17.55 | 42.77% | 22.45% | 64.86% | 10.73 | 1.55 | 1.18 | 0.27 |
| Terrico White | 18 | 41:01 | 20.39 | 48.98% | 29.17% | 66.04% | 7.00 | 3.67 | 1.56 | 0.33 |

== Transactions ==
=== Free agency ===
==== Re-signed ====
| Date | Player | Contract terms | Ref. |
|---|---|---|---|
| August 5, 2022 | Sim Bhullar | — | |
| September 14, 2022 | Iong Ngai-San | development player contract | |

==== Additions ====
| Date | Player | Contract terms | Former team | Ref. |
|---|---|---|---|---|
| August 5, 2022 | Will Artino | — | Tainan TSG GhostHawks | |
| August 9, 2022 | Chiang Kuang-Chien | — | Taoyuan Pauian Archiland | |
| August 10, 2022 | Lu Chi-Min | — | Taiwan Beer | |
| August 16, 2022 | Tseng Po-Yu | — | Kaohsiung Jeoutai Technology | |
| August 19, 2022 | Anthony Bennett | — | Kaohsiung Steelers | |
| September 16, 2022 | Ifeanyi Eboka | — | SHU Tigers | |
| October 21, 2022 | Terrico White | — | (Puerto Rico) Brujos de Guayama | |
| February 2, 2023 | Chen Tse-Yu | — | New Taipei Yulon Luxgen Dinos | |
| March 3, 2023 | Jeremy Tyler | — | (Puerto Rico) Piratas de Quebradillas | |

==== Subtractions ====
| Date | Player | Reason | New Team | Ref. |
|---|---|---|---|---|
| June 27, 2022 | Elliot Tan | retirement | — | |
| July 19, 2022 | Mike Bruesewitz | — | (Mexico) Mineros de Zacatecas | |
| July 22, 2022 | Wu Tai-Hao | contract expired | Tainan TSG GhostHawks | |
| August 1, 2022 | Nick Faust | — | (Bahrain) Al-Ahli | |
| December 15, 2022 | Lin Yi-Huei | contract terminated | Taoyuan Leopards | |
| December 16, 2022 | Sim Bhullar | contract terminated | Tainan TSG GhostHawks | |
| January 24, 2023 | Lin Ming-Yi | mutually agreed to part ways | Taichung Suns | |
| March 17, 2023 | Terrico White | waived | (Bahrain) Al-Najma | |

== Awards ==
=== End-of-season awards ===
| Recipient | Award | Ref. |
|---|---|---|
| Hsinchu JKO Lioneers | Best Home Court | |
| Hsiao Shun-Yi | All-Defensive Team | |
| Kao Kuo-Hao | All-Defensive Team | |
| Kao Kuo-Hao | All-PLG Second Team | |

=== Players of the Week ===
| Week | Recipient | Date awarded | Ref. |
|---|---|---|---|
| Week 3 | Kao Kuo-Hao | November 19 - November 20 | |
| Week 9 | Kao Kuo-Hao | December 31 - January 1 | |
| Week 11 | Anthony Bennett | January 13 - January 15 | |
