= 1968–69 Auburn Tigers men's basketball team =

American college basketball season

1968–69 Auburn Tigers men's basketball

Mobile Classic champions
- Conference: Southeastern Conference
- Record: 15–10 (10–8 SEC)
- Head coach: Bill Lynn (6th season)
- Captain: Tom Perry
- Home arena: Auburn Sports Arena and Memorial Coliseum

1968–69 Southeastern Conference men's basketball standings
	Conf.				Overall
Team	W		L	PCT	W		L	PCT
No. 7 Kentucky	16	–	2	.889	23	–	5	.821
Tennessee	13	–	5	.722	21	–	7	.750
Florida	12	–	6	.667	18	–	9	.667
Auburn	10	–	8	.556	15	–	10	.600
Vanderbilt	9	–	9	.500	15	–	11	.577
Georgia	9	–	9	.500	13	–	12	.520
LSU	7	–	11	.389	13	–	13	.500
Ole Miss	7	–	11	.389	10	–	14	.417
Mississippi State	6	–	12	.333	8	–	17	.320
Alabama	1	–	17	.056	4	–	20	.167
Rankings from AP Poll

The 1968–69 Auburn Tigers men's basketball team represented Auburn University in the 1968–69 college basketball season. The team's head coach was Bill Lynn, who was in his sixth season at Auburn. The team played their home games at Auburn Sports Arena and Memorial Coliseum in Auburn, Alabama. They finished the season 15–10, 10–8 in SEC play.
