= 2022–23 Kaohsiung 17LIVE Steelers season =

Taiwanese professional basketball season

Kaohsiung 17LIVE Steelers
2022–23 season
- President: Huang Che-Kuan
- General Manager: Kenny Kao
- Head Coach: ~~Slavoljub Gorunovic~~(fired); ~~Hung Chi-Chao~~(interim); ~~Dean Murray~~(fired); ~~Hung Chi-Chao~~(interim); Cheng Chih-Lung
- Arena: Fengshan Arena
- P. League+: 17–23 (.425)
- Playoffs: Did not qualify.
- Scoring leader: Chen Yu-Wei (9.38)
- Rebounding leader: Chen Yu-Wei (5.54)
- Assists leader: Chen Yu-Wei (5.35)
- Highest home attendance: 5,321 (7 games)
- Lowest home attendance: 1,283 (January 6, 2023)
- Average home attendance: 3,948
- Biggest win: Steelers 93–63 Pilots (March 5, 2023)
- Biggest defeat: Steelers 80–114 Braves (December 17, 2022)
- All statistics correct as of May 18, 2023.

The 2022–23 Kaohsiung 17LIVE Steelers season will be the franchise's 2nd season, its second season in the P. LEAGUE+ (PLG), its 2nd in Kaohsiung City. The Steelers promoted Slavoljub Gorunovic, the head assistant coach for their previous season, to the head coach. The Steelers also hired Cheng Chih-Lung as their COO of the Basketball Affairs. The Steelers named Kenny Kao, former Hsinchu JKO Lioneers general manager, as their new general manager.

On October 13, 2022, the team was renamed to Kaohsiung 17LIVE Steelers. On October 28, the Steelers fired head coach Slavoljub Gorunovic before the season and named assistant coach, Hung Chi-Chao as their interim head coach. On November 10, 2022, the Steelers named Dean Murray as their head coach. On December 29, the Steelers fired Dean Murray and named assistant coach, Hung Chi-Chao as their interim head coach. On January 7, the Steelers named Cheng Chih-Lung as their head coach.

== Draft ==
Round	Pick	Player	Position	Status	School/club team
2	8	Jamarcus Mearidy	G	Foreign student	VNU

On October 27, 2021, the Steelers' 2022 first-round draft pick was traded to Taipei Fubon Braves in exchange for Wang Lu-Hsiang.

== Standings ==
Pos	Team	W	L	PCT	GB	Qualification
1	New Taipei Kings	27	13	.675	—	Playoffs
2	Taipei Fubon Braves	25	15	.625	2	Playoffs
3	Taoyuan Pauian Pilots	19	21	.475	8	Playoffs
4	Formosa Taishin Dreamers	19	21	.475	8	Playoffs
5	Kaohsiung 17LIVE Steelers	17	23	.425	10	
6	Hsinchu JKO Lioneers	13	27	.325	14	

Updated to match(es) played on May 14, 2023. Source: P.League+

== Roster ==
Note: Flags indicate national team eligibility at FIBA-sanctioned events. Players may hold other non-FIBA nationalities not displayed.

2022–23 Kaohsiung 17LIVE Steelers roster
Players
Coaches

Pos.	No.	Nat.	Name	Ht.	Wt.	DOB (YYYY-MM-DD)	From
F	0	(United States) (Jamaica)	Femi Olujobi (I)	2.06 m (6 ft 9 in)	114 kg (251 lb)	29 – 5 March 1996	DePaul
F	1	(Taiwan)	Lin Po-Hao	1.92 m (6 ft 4 in)	78 kg (172 lb)	28 – 18 January 1997	UKN
G	2	(United States)	Jay West	1.84 m (6 ft 0 in)	87.9 kg (194 lb)	27 – 6 September 1997	VNU
F	3	(United States)	Gokul Natesan (I)	1.96 m (6 ft 5 in)	86 kg (190 lb)	31 – 20 May 1994	Colorado Mines
G	4	(Taiwan)	Chen Yu-Wei	1.83 m (6 ft 0 in)	85 kg (187 lb)	25 – 29 December 1999	NTNU
F	5	(United States)	Wendell Lewis (I)	2.08 m (6 ft 10 in)	118 kg (260 lb)	35 – 21 September 1989	Alabama State
G	6	(Taiwan)	Chou Yi-Hsiang (injured)	1.91 m (6 ft 3 in)	99 kg (218 lb)	34 – 4 February 1991	SLCC
G	7	(United States) (Taiwan)	Jeremy Lin	1.90 m (6 ft 3 in)	91 kg (201 lb)	36 – 23 August 1988	Harvard
G	8	(Taiwan)	Wang Lu-Hsiang	1.85 m (6 ft 1 in)	82 kg (181 lb)	27 – 21 December 1997	CCUT
C	10	(Taiwan)	Wang Po-Chih	1.95 m (6 ft 5 in)	130 kg (287 lb)	28 – 29 October 1996	NTSU
F	11	(Taiwan)	Lin Jyun-Hao	1.93 m (6 ft 4 in)	88 kg (194 lb)	27 – 18 January 1998	NTUA
F	12	(Taiwan)	Cheng Te-Wei	1.93 m (6 ft 4 in)	98 kg (216 lb)	29 – 8 October 1995	SHU
F	13	(Taiwan)	Lu Cheng-Ju (C)	1.94 m (6 ft 4 in)	93 kg (205 lb)	39 – 13 April 1986	TPEC
F	14	(Taiwan)	Chiu Po-Chang	1.88 m (6 ft 2 in)	91 kg (201 lb)	29 – 2 November 1995	NTUA
G	15	(Taiwan)	Lu Che-Yi	1.87 m (6 ft 2 in)	83 kg (183 lb)	32 – 15 July 1993	I-Shou
C	18	(Taiwan)	Lin Chih-Wei	2.00 m (6 ft 7 in)	95 kg (209 lb)	33 – 10 July 1992	Chinese Culture
C	20	(Taiwan)	Sun Szu-Yao	2.05 m (6 ft 9 in)	100 kg (220 lb)	27 – 3 October 1997	NYIT
C	23	(Taiwan)	Lan Shao-Fu	1.95 m (6 ft 5 in)	100 kg (220 lb)	28 – 21 March 1997	NTSU
F	77	(Taiwan)	Chang Po-Wei	1.90 m (6 ft 3 in)	90 kg (198 lb)	35 – 22 July 1990	NTUA

Head coach

- (Taiwan) Cheng Chih-Lung

Assistant coach(es)

- (Taiwan) Han Yi-Ping
- (Taiwan) Hung Chi-Chao
- (Taiwan) Lee Wan-Ju

Athletic trainer(s)

- (Taiwan) Bao Chun-Hsin
- (Taiwan) Huang Yu-Chun

Team manager

- (Taiwan) Shen Chiu-Chan
- (Taiwan) Tzou Hua-Kung

Legend

- (C) Team captain
- (I) Import player
- Injured

- Roster
Updated: 18 March 2023

== Game log ==
=== Preseason ===
2022 preseason game log
Total: 0–2 (Home: 0–2; Road: 0–0)
Preseason : 0–2 (Home: 0–2; Road: 0–0)

Game	Date	Team	Score	High points	High rebounds	High assists	Location Attendance	Record
1	October 8	Braves	L 88–94	Andrija Bojić (24)	Andrija Bojić (16)	Chen Yu-Wei (7)	Fengshan Arena; 4,205	0–1
2	October 10	Lioneers	L 102–111	Femi Olujobi (34)	Femi Olujobi (9)	Chen Yu-Wei (6)	Fengshan Arena; 3,306	0–2

2022–23 schedule

=== Regular season ===
2022–23 game log
Total: 17–23 (Home: 10–10; Road: 7–13)
November : 0–5 (Home: 0–2; Road: 0–3)

Game	Date	Team	Score	High points	High rebounds	High assists	Location Attendance	Record
1	November 6	@Braves	L 114–117	Femi Olujobi (28)	Femi Olujobi (13)	Chen Yu-Wei (10)	Taipei Heping Basketball Gymnasium; 6,530	0–1
2	November 12	@Dreamers	L 76–84	Femi Olujobi (22)	Femi Olujobi (14)	Chen Yu-Wei (7)	Intercontinental Basketball Stadium; 3,000	0–2
3	November 19	@Lioneers	L 83–89	Femi Olujobi (35)	Femi Olujobi (18)	Chen Yu-Wei (13)	Hsinchu County Stadium; 5,238	0–3
4	November 27	Pilots	L 78–108	Terrence Jones (22)	Terrence Jones (11)	Terrence Jones (6)	Fengshan Arena; 3,250	0–4
5	November 29	Lioneers	L 101–102	Terrence Jones (43)	Terrence Jones (15)	Chou Yi-Hsiang (5)	Fengshan Arena; 2,505	0–5

December : 1–7 (Home: 1–2; Road: 0–5)

Game	Date	Team	Score	High points	High rebounds	High assists	Location Attendance	Record
6	December 3	Braves	L 119–125	Terrence Jones (39)	Terrence Jones (12)	Chen Yu-Wei (6)	Fengshan Arena; 3,306	0–6
7	December 4	Kings	W 115–95	Terrence Jones (33)	Femi Olujobi (18)	Chen, Jones (5)	Fengshan Arena; 3,260	1–6
8	December 11	@Pilots	L 83–100	Terrence Jones (30)	Terrence Jones (15)	Chen Yu-Wei (7)	Taoyuan Arena; 2,187	1–7
9	December 17	@Braves	L 80–114	Femi Olujobi (32)	Femi Olujobi (10)	Chen, Harrison (4)	Taipei Heping Basketball Gymnasium; 5,208	1–8
10	December 20	Kings	L 89–100	Aaron Harrison (23)	Aaron Harrison (11)	Wang Po-Chih (5)	Fengshan Arena; 1,925	1–9
11	December 24	@Dreamers	L 94–117	Viacheslav Kravtsov (19)	Viacheslav Kravtsov (14)	Chen Yu-Wei (7)	Intercontinental Basketball Stadium; 2,876	1–10
12	December 27	@Lioneers	L 85–109	Viacheslav Kravtsov (25)	Lan Shao-Fu (12)	Chen, Kravtsov (5)	Hsinchu County Stadium; 3,517	1–11
13	December 31	@Kings	L 86–109	Viacheslav Kravtsov (28)	Kravtsov, Lan (10)	Chen Yu-Wei (9)	Xinzhuang Gymnasium; 4,159	1–12

January : 1–2 (Home: 1–1; Road: 0–1)

Game	Date	Team	Score	High points	High rebounds	High assists	Location Attendance	Record
14	January 6	Pilots	L 97–110	Viacheslav Kravtsov (24)	Viacheslav Kravtsov (12)	Chen Yu-Wei (6)	Fengshan Arena; 1,283	1–13
15	January 8	Dreamers	W 105–88	Jay West (25)	Viacheslav Kravtsov (11)	Jay West (8)	Fengshan Arena; 1,988	2–13
PPD	January 14	Braves	Postponed					
PPD	January 17	@Kings	Postponed					
16	January 29	@Braves	L 82–106	Viacheslav Kravtsov (22)	Chen Yu-Wei (8)	Chen Yu-Wei (6)	Taipei Heping Basketball Gymnasium; 5,240	2–14

February : 2–5 (Home: 1–2; Road: 1–3)

Game	Date	Team	Score	High points	High rebounds	High assists	Location Attendance	Record
17	February 3	Dreamers	L 101–106	Viacheslav Kravtsov (20)	Kravtsov, Olujobi (9)	Jay West (9)	Fengshan Arena; 1,536	2–15
18	February 5	@Lioneers	L 86–89	Viacheslav Kravtsov (18)	Viacheslav Kravtsov (13)	Chen Yu-Wei (7)	Hsinchu County Stadium; 5,582	2–16
19	February 11	Kings	L 102–109	Femi Olujobi (40)	Femi Olujobi (7)	Chen Yu-Wei (9)	Fengshan Arena; 3,150	2–17
20	February 12	Dreamers	W 95–80	Viacheslav Kravtsov (24)	Viacheslav Kravtsov (18)	Jeremy Lin (13)	Fengshan Arena; 5,321	3–17
21	February 18	@Dreamers	L 91–102	Viacheslav Kravtsov (26)	Jeremy Lin (12)	Jeremy Lin (5)	Intercontinental Basketball Stadium; 3,000	3–18
22	February 25	@Lioneers	W 95–82	Jeremy Lin (32)	Femi Olujobi (15)	Jeremy Lin (7)	Hsinchu County Stadium; 8,000	4–18
23	February 28	@Kings	L 88–101	Jeremy Lin (23)	Kravtsov, Olujobi (12)	Jeremy Lin (6)	Xinzhuang Gymnasium; 6,800	4–19

March : 4–2 (Home: 2–2; Road: 2–0)

Game	Date	Team	Score	High points	High rebounds	High assists	Location Attendance	Record
24	March 5	@Pilots	W 93–63	Jeremy Lin (26)	Jeremy Lin (14)	Chen, J. Lin (5)	Taoyuan Arena; 4,300	5–19
25	March 10	Braves	W 103–102	Femi Olujobi (19)	Femi Olujobi (18)	Femi Olujobi (6)	Fengshan Arena; 5,321	6–19
26	March 11	Lioneers	L 76–85	Viacheslav Kravtsov (23)	Viacheslav Kravtsov (9)	Chen Yu-Wei (10)	Fengshan Arena; 5,127	6–20
27	March 19	@Pilots	W 99–86	Jeremy Lin (38)	Wendell Lewis (19)	J. Lin, Natesan (5)	Taoyuan Arena; 4,300	7–20
28	March 25	Braves	L 95–101	Lewis, J. Lin (22)	Wendell Lewis (14)	Jeremy Lin (7)	Fengshan Arena; 5,321	7–21
29	March 26	Pilots	W 99–84	Jeremy Lin (24)	Sun Szu-Yao (11)	Jeremy Lin (15)	Fengshan Arena; 5,160	8–21

April : 7–1 (Home: 4–0; Road: 3–1)

Game	Date	Team	Score	High points	High rebounds	High assists	Location Attendance	Record
30	April 2	@Dreamers	W 97–87	Jeremy Lin (25)	Wendell Lewis (10)	Jeremy Lin (16)	Intercontinental Basketball Stadium; 3,000	9–21
31	April 8	Lioneers	W 112–103	Femi Olujobi (35)	Femi Olujobi (9)	Jeremy Lin (10)	Fengshan Arena; 4,321	10–21
32	April 9	Braves	W 106–105	Gokul Natesan (27)	Wendell Lewis (10)	Jeremy Lin (11)	Fengshan Arena; 5,321	11–21
33	April 14	@Pilots	W 101–93	J. Lin, Olujobi (29)	Femi Olujobi (16)	Jeremy Lin (10)	Taoyuan Arena; 5,000	12–21
34	April 16	@Kings	W 92–85	Wendell Lewis (20)	Wendell Lewis (19)	Jeremy Lin (10)	Xinzhuang Gymnasium; 6,800	13–21
35	April 22	Lioneers	W 113–88	Jeremy Lin (30)	Wendell Lewis (8)	Wendell Lewis (6)	Fengshan Arena; 4,892	14–21
36	April 23	Kings	W 116–110	Jeremy Lin (50)	Wendell Lewis (17)	Jeremy Lin (11)	Fengshan Arena; 5,321	15–21
37	April 30	@Kings	L 100–104	Jeremy Lin (37)	Jeremy Lin (14)	Jeremy Lin (12)	Xinzhuang Gymnasium; 6,800	15–22

May : 2–1 (Home: 1–1; Road: 1–0)

Game	Date	Team	Score	High points	High rebounds	High assists	Location Attendance	Record
38	May 6	@Braves	W 120–103	Jeremy Lin (36)	Jeremy Lin (10)	Jeremy Lin (15)	Taipei Heping Basketball Gymnasium; 7,000	16–22
39	May 13	Pilots	W 80–60	J. Lin, Lewis (18)	Femi Olujobi (12)	Jeremy Lin (6)	Fengshan Arena; 5,321	17–22
40	May 14	Dreamers	L 89–92	Wendell Lewis (23)	Wendell Lewis (14)	Chen Yu-Wei (6)	Fengshan Arena; 5,321	17–23

2022–23 schedule

== Player statistics ==
Legend
GP	Games played	MPG	Minutes per game	2P%	2-point field goal percentage
3P%	3-point field goal percentage	FT%	Free throw percentage	RPG	Rebounds per game
APG	Assists per game	SPG	Steals per game	BPG	Blocks per game
PPG	Points per game		Led the league

=== Regular season ===
Player	GP	MPG	PPG	2P%	3P%	FT%	RPG	APG	SPG	BPG
Andrija Bojic	1	30:34	16.00	47.06%	0.00%	0.00%	10.00	0.00	1.00	1.00
Chang Po-Wei	34	17:07	4.15	43.42%	26.19%	56.25%	2.41	0.79	0.68	0.06
Chen Yu-Wei	37	34:43	9.38	47.35%	27.13%	68.29%	5.54	5.35	1.11	0.38
Cheng Te-Wei	2	01:48	1.50	0.00%	100.00%	0.00%	0.00	0.00	0.00	0.00
Chiu Po-Chang	20	13:12	3.70	31.88%	50.00%	75.00%	1.95	0.90	0.35	0.00
Chou Yi-Hsiang	7	28:31	6.00	28.57%	26.67%	66.67%	2.14	2.00	0.00	0.14
Manny Harris	2	34:10	18.50	40.91%	35.71%	66.67%	8.50	3.50	1.50	1.00
Aaron Harrison	9	33:58	19.56	44.64%	34.07%	89.19%	5.11	3.33	2.33	0.56
Terrence Jones	5	44:15	33.40	56.32%	30.30%	55.71%	12.80	4.80	2.60	1.80
Viacheslav Kravtsov	13	40:45	21.08	57.06%	40.00%	66.67%	11.38	1.62	1.00	1.38
Lan Shao-Fu	28	17:09	5.18	47.50%	27.27%	62.50%	3.68	0.64	0.39	0.21
Wendell Lewis	14	38:07	16.50	58.29%	0.00%	76.47%	12.00	2.64	1.29	0.86
Lin Chih-Wei	8	09:28	1.38	13.79%	0.00%	50.00%	2.00	0.13	0.00	0.13
Jeremy Lin	19	37:15	26.32	49.45%	35.00%	84.25%	8.47	8.89	1.84	0.53
Lin Jyun-Hao	7	02:03	0.57	100.00%	0.00%	0.00%	0.29	0.14	0.00	0.00
Lin Po-Hao	11	09:55	2.91	39.13%	18.75%	83.33%	1.36	0.18	0.09	0.00
Lu Che-Yi	5	05:59	0.80	66.67%	0.00%	0.00%	1.00	0.40	0.60	0.00
Lu Cheng-Ju	36	26:58	8.39	45.45%	32.74%	39.39%	2.92	1.61	0.58	0.11
Gokul Natesan	14	29:23	16.64	56.58%	40.22%	70.59%	3.93	3.50	2.21	0.50
Femi Olujobi	22	35:49	20.50	57.50%	28.83%	72.48%	10.95	2.09	0.86	1.14
Peng Chun-Yen	Did not play									
Sun Szu-Yao	21	13:18	3.86	59.68%	0.00%	50.00%	4.00	0.14	0.38	0.24
Wang Lu-Hsiang	39	25:47	8.46	37.93%	36.90%	76.09%	2.08	1.23	0.72	0.10
Wang Po-Chih	20	15:37	4.75	44.23%	36.84%	70.00%	3.15	0.70	0.40	0.40
Jay West	32	12:16	4.38	44.32%	20.45%	72.92%	2.97	1.91	0.78	0.19
Matthew Yang	Did not play									

== Transactions ==
=== Free Agency ===
==== Re-signed ====
Date	Player	Contract terms	Ref.
August 11, 2022	Manny Harris	—	

==== Additions ====
Date	Player	Contract terms	Former team	Ref.
July 11, 2022	Lin Chih-Wei	—	(Japan) Rizing Zephyr Fukuoka	
July 15, 2022	Lin Po-Hao	—	Kaohsiung Jeoutai Technology	
August 1, 2022	Jay West(Jamarcus Mearidy)	—	VNU Lions	
August 18, 2022	Vance Jackson	—	(United States) East Carolina Pirates	
August 22, 2022	Femi Olujobi	—	(France) ESSM Le Portel	
September 2, 2022	Chiu Po-Chang	—	Taichung Wagor Suns	
September 8, 2022	Andrija Bojić	—	(Serbia) Mladost Maxbet	
October 27, 2022	Terrence Jones	—	(Puerto Rico) Cariduros de Fajardo	
December 1, 2022	Aaron Harrison	—	(Slovenia) KK Cedevita Olimpija	
December 7, 2022	Sun Szu-Yao	—	Taichung Suns	
December 15, 2022	Viacheslav Kravtsov	—	(Spain) Menorca	
January 26, 2023	Jeremy Lin	—	(China) Guangzhou Loong Lions	
February 2, 2023	Gokul Natesan	—	(Romania) Steaua CSM EximBank Bucuresti	
March 18, 2023	Wendell Lewis	—	(Italy) OraSi Ravenna	

==== Subtractions ====
Date	Player	Reason	New Team	Ref.
July 25, 2022	Austin Derrick	contract terminated	Taichung Suns	
August 9, 2022	Anthony Bennett	contract expired	Hsinchu JKO Lioneers	
August 11, 2022	Keith Benson	contract expired	(Lithuania) Juventus	
August 11, 2022	Taylor Braun	contract expired	Tainan TSG GhostHawks	
October 27, 2022	Vance Jackson	contract terminated	(Qatar) Al-Arabi	
November 22, 2022	Andrija Bojić	contract terminated	(Serbia) Spartak Subotica	
November 30, 2022	Peng Chun-Yen	contract terminated	Taichung Suns	
December 26, 2022	Manny Harris	contract terminated	(Israel) Hapoel Holon	
December 26, 2022	Terrence Jones	contract terminated	(Puerto Rico) Leones de Ponce	
February 6, 2023	Aaron Harrison	contract terminated	(Puerto Rico) Capitanes de Arecibo	
February 9, 2023	Matthew Yang	contract terminated	Changhua BLL	
March 18, 2023	Viacheslav Kravtsov	waived	(Bahrain) Al-Ittihad	

== Awards ==
=== End-of-Season Awards ===
Recipient	Award	Ref.
Jeremy Lin	Assists Leader	

=== Players of the Week ===
Week	Recipient	Date awarded	Ref.
Week 15	Jeremy Lin	February 11 - February 12	
Week 20	Jeremy Lin	March 18 - March 19	
Week 22	Jeremy Lin	April 1 - April 4	
Week 23	Jeremy Lin	April 8 - April 9	
Week 24	Jeremy Lin	April 14 - April 16	
Week 25	Jeremy Lin	April 22 - April 23	
Week 26	Jeremy Lin	April 29 - May 1	
Week 27	Jeremy Lin	May 5 - May 9	
Week 28	Jeremy Lin	May 13 - May 14	

=== Players of the Month ===
Recipient	Award	Month awarded	Ref.
Jeremy Lin	March Most Valuable Player	March	
Jeremy Lin	April Most Valuable Player	April	
