= 2022–23 New Taipei Kings season =

Taiwanese professional basketball season

New Taipei Kings
2022–23 season
- President: Walter Wang
- General Manager: James Mao
- Head Coach: Ryan Marchand
- Arena: Xinzhuang Gymnasium
- P. League+: 27–13(.675)
- Playoffs: PLG finals (lost to Braves 2–4)
- Scoring leader: Byron Mullens(21.47)
- Rebounding leader: Byron Mullens(15.50)
- Assists leader: Kenny Manigault(6.00)
- Highest home attendance: 6,800 (3 games)
- Lowest home attendance: 2,485 (March 28, 2023)
- Average home attendance: 4,228
- Biggest win: Kings 113–78 Lioneers (November 13, 2022)
- Biggest defeat: Kings 73–98 Lioneers (April 2, 2023)
- All statistics correct as of June 14, 2023.

The 2022–23 New Taipei Kings season will be the franchise's 2nd season, its second season in the P. LEAGUE+ (PLG), its 2nd in New Taipei City. The Kings are coached by Ryan Marchand in his second year as head coach.

== Draft ==
Round	Pick	Player	Position	Status	School/club team
2	9	Li Wei-Ting	G	Local	SHU

The Kings' 2022 first-round draft pick was traded to Taoyuan Pilots in exchange for 2021 first-round draft pick.

== Standings ==
Pos	Team	W	L	PCT	GB	Qualification
1	New Taipei Kings	27	13	.675	—	Playoffs
2	Taipei Fubon Braves	25	15	.625	2	Playoffs
3	Taoyuan Pauian Pilots	19	21	.475	8	Playoffs
4	Formosa Taishin Dreamers	19	21	.475	8	Playoffs
5	Kaohsiung 17LIVE Steelers	17	23	.425	10	
6	Hsinchu JKO Lioneers	13	27	.325	14	

Updated to match(es) played on May 14, 2023. Source: P.League+

== Roster ==
Note: Flags indicate national team eligibility at FIBA-sanctioned events. Players may hold other non-FIBA nationalities not displayed.

2022–23 New Taipei Kings roster
Players
Coaches

Pos.	No.	Nat.	Name	Ht.	Wt.	DOB (YYYY-MM-DD)	From
F	0	(Taiwan)	Li Ruei-Ci (injured)	1.93 m (6 ft 4 in)	87 kg (192 lb)	32 – 7 January 1993	TSU
G	1	(United States) (Taiwan)	Joseph Lin	1.82 m (6 ft 0 in)	69 kg (152 lb)	33 – 21 June 1992	Hamilton
G	2	(Taiwan)	Lin Shih-Hsuan	1.77 m (5 ft 10 in)	76 kg (168 lb)	26 – 28 December 1998	NTNU
F	3	(Taiwan)	Chen Chun-Nan	1.90 m (6 ft 3 in)	90 kg (198 lb)	25 – 20 April 2000	NTSU
G	4	(Taiwan)	Li Wei-Ting	1.81 m (5 ft 11 in)	84.3 kg (186 lb)	25 – 3 October 1999	SHU
C	5	(United States) (United Kingdom)	Byron Mullens (I)	2.13 m (7 ft 0 in)	122 kg (269 lb)	36 – 14 February 1989	Ohio State
F	6	(Taiwan)	Yang Chin-Min (C)	1.90 m (6 ft 3 in)	92 kg (203 lb)	41 – 22 January 1984	Fu Jen
G	7	(Taiwan)	Lin Li-Jen	1.83 m (6 ft 0 in)	85 kg (187 lb)	35 – 16 June 1990	MingDao
G	9	(Taiwan)	Lee Kai-Yan	1.82 m (6 ft 0 in)	80 kg (176 lb)	32 – 6 May 1993	HWU
G	10	(Taiwan)	Chien You-Che	1.80 m (5 ft 11 in)	80 kg (176 lb)	29 – 10 September 1995	Chien Hsin Tech
F	13	(Taiwan)	Yang Hsing-Chih	1.95 m (6 ft 5 in)	100 kg (220 lb)	31 – 9 November 1993	NTNU
F	15	(Taiwan)	Tseng Yu-Hao	1.96 m (6 ft 5 in)	94 kg (207 lb)	26 – 4 August 1999	NCCU
F	17	(Taiwan)	Su Shih-Hsuan	1.97 m (6 ft 6 in)	95 kg (209 lb)	29 – 9 April 1996	NTNU
F	19	(Taiwan)	Lin Chin-Pang	1.90 m (6 ft 3 in)	90 kg (198 lb)	40 – 15 June 1985	NTCPE
G	22	(Taiwan)	Kao Cheng-En	1.78 m (5 ft 10 in)	85 kg (187 lb)	25 – 23 December 1999	Chien Hsin Tech
G	24	(Taiwan)	Hung Chih-Shan	1.76 m (5 ft 9 in)	80 kg (176 lb)	40 – 5 July 1985	NTUT
C	25	(Senegal)	Omar Niang	2.05 m (6 ft 9 in)	98 kg (216 lb)	27 – 15 May 1998	NCCU
C	50	(Taiwan)	Quincy Davis	2.03 m (6 ft 8 in)	114 kg (251 lb)	42 – 16 February 1983	Tulane
F	55	(United States)	Kenny Manigault (I)	1.96 m (6 ft 5 in)	93 kg (205 lb)	34 – 22 May 1991	Pikeville

Head coach

- (United States) Ryan Marchand

Assistant coach(es)

- (United States) Mark Coppola
- (Taiwan) Hsu Hao-Cheng

Strength & conditioning coach(es)

- (Taiwan) Chang Chung-Hsi

Athletic trainer(s)

- (Taiwan) Chiu Po-Kai
- (Taiwan) Wu Chung-Hao

Team manager

- (Taiwan) Hung Chih-Hu

Legend

- (C) Team captain
- (I) Import player
- Injured

- Roster
Updated: 9 March, 2023

== Game log ==
=== Venice Basketball League ===
July 31
17:00 UTC−7

Recap

Taipei Kings 62, Venice 5 79

Venice Beach, Los Angeles, California

=== Preseason ===
2022 preseason game log
Total: 0–2 (Home: 0–1; Road: 0–1)
Preseason : 0–2 (Home: 0–1; Road: 0–1)

Game	Date	Team	Score	High points	High rebounds	High assists	Location Attendance	Record
1	October 9	@Braves	L 99-114	Byron Mullens (18)	Byron Mullens (10)	Artis, Lee K., Li (2)	Fengshan Arena; 3,668	0–1
2	October 10	Pilots	L 84-105	Byron Mullens (29)	Quincy Davis (11)	Yang Chin-Min (4)	Fengshan Arena; 3,306	0–2

2022–23 schedule

=== Regular season ===
2022–23 game log
Total: 27–13 (Home: 14–6; Road: 13–7)
November : 4–1 (Home: 3–1; Road: 1–0)

Game	Date	Team	Score	High points	High rebounds	High assists	Location Attendance	Record
1	November 12	Pilots	W 104–91	Byron Mullens (27)	Byron Mullens (16)	Lee Kai-Yan (7)	Xinzhuang Gymnasium; 4,493	1–0
2	November 13	Lioneers	W 113–78	Joseph Lin (28)	Byron Mullens (9)	Joseph Lin (7)	Xinzhuang Gymnasium; 4,163	2–0
3	November 19	@Dreamers	W 101–89	Yang Chin-Min (25)	Byron Mullens (17)	Joseph Lin (6)	Intercontinental Basketball Stadium; 3,000	3–0
4	November 25	Braves	W 104–89	Byron Mullens (23)	Lin C., Mullens (10)	Kenny Manigault (8)	Xinzhuang Gymnasium; 4,722	4–0
5	November 27	Dreamers	L 82–102	Byron Mullens (29)	Kenny Manigault (14)	Lee Kai-Yan (5)	Xinzhuang Gymnasium; 3,320	4–1

December : 6–2 (Home: 2–0; Road: 4–2)

Game	Date	Team	Score	High points	High rebounds	High assists	Location Attendance	Record
6	December 2	Pilots	W 93–88	Austin Daye (20)	Byron Mullens (25)	Lee Kai-Yan (7)	Xinzhuang Gymnasium; 2,835	5–1
7	December 4	@Steelers	L 95–115	Byron Mullens (26)	Byron Mullens (12)	Lee Kai-Yan (6)	Fengshan Arena; 3,260	5–2
8	December 10	@Braves	W 103–99	Byron Mullens (38)	Byron Mullens (17)	Manigault, Mullens (4)	Taipei Heping Basketball Gymnasium; 6,645	6–2
9	December 17	@Pilots	L 74–88	Austin Daye (16)	Byron Mullens (14)	Joseph Lin (5)	Taoyuan Arena; 2,632	6–3
10	December 20	@Steelers	W 100–89	Chien You-Che (16)	Byron Mullens (12)	Lee K., J. Lin (6)	Fengshan Arena; 1,925	7–3
11	December 23	@Braves	W 106–101	Yang Chin-Min (29)	Byron Mullens (18)	Kenny Manigault (6)	Taipei Heping Basketball Gymnasium; 6,015	8–3
12	December 25	@Dreamers	W 99–90	Byron Mullens (20)	Byron Mullens (17)	Kenny Manigault (8)	Intercontinental Basketball Stadium; 3,000	9–3
13	December 31	Steelers	W 109–86	Byron Mullens (32)	Byron Mullens (16)	Lee Kai-Yan (7)	Xinzhuang Gymnasium; 4,159	10–3

January : 3–1 (Home: 1–0; Road: 2–1)

Game	Date	Team	Score	High points	High rebounds	High assists	Location Attendance	Record
14	January 1	Braves	W 95–83	Byron Mullens (29)	Byron Mullens (21)	Kenny Manigault (11)	Xinzhuang Gymnasium; 6,540	11–3
15	January 7	@Lioneers	W 101–85	Byron Mullens (23)	Byron Mullens (21)	Joseph Lin (7)	Hsinchu County Stadium; 4,177	12–3
16	January 14	@Lioneers	L 106–107	Byron Mullens (27)	Byron Mullens (17)	Joseph Lin (7)	Hsinchu County Stadium; 4,694	12–4
PPD	January 17	Steelers	Postponed					
17	January 29	@Dreamers	W 90–73	Austin Daye (16)	Byron Mullens (17)	Hung Chih-Shan (5)	Intercontinental Basketball Stadium; 3,000	13–4

February : 4–1 (Home: 1–0; Road: 3–1)

Game	Date	Team	Score	High points	High rebounds	High assists	Location Attendance	Record
18	February 4	@Braves	L 109–111	Kenny Manigault (23)	Byron Mullens (11)	Joseph Lin (7)	Taipei Heping Basketball Gymnasium; 6,525	13–5
19	February 11	@Steelers	W 109–102	Austin Daye (25)	Byron Mullens (15)	Byron Mullens (7)	Fengshan Arena; 3,150	14–5
20	February 19	@Lioneers	W 102–85	Byron Mullens (44)	Byron Mullens (24)	Kenny Manigault (11)	Hsinchu County Stadium; 5,597	15–5
21	February 25	@Pilots	W 77–73	Yang Chin-Min (24)	Byron Mullens (15)	Joseph Lin (8)	Taoyuan Arena; 3,789	16–5
22	February 28	Steelers	W 101–88	Byron Mullens (32)	Byron Mullens (17)	Joseph Lin (10)	Xinzhuang Gymnasium; 6,800	17–5

March : 5–2 (Home: 3–1; Road: 2–1)

Game	Date	Team	Score	High points	High rebounds	High assists	Location Attendance	Record
23	March 4	@Pilots	W 98–95	Byron Mullens (29)	Byron Mullens (19)	Lee Kai-Yan (8)	Taoyuan Arena; 2,669	18–5
24	March 7	Dreamers	W 111–105	Yang Chin-Min (24)	Quincy Davis (14)	Kenny Manigault (9)	Xinzhuang Gymnasium; 2,552	19–5
25	March 11	Dreamers	W 117–89	Byron Mullens (32)	Byron Mullens (17)	Kenny Manigault (13)	Xinzhuang Gymnasium; 3,577	20–5
26	March 12	Braves	L 95–106	Yang Chin-Min (21)	Byron Mullens (17)	Kenny Manigault (8)	Xinzhuang Gymnasium; 4,257	20–6
27	March 18	@Braves	W 97–90	J. Lin, Manigault (21)	Kenny Manigault (16)	Joseph Lin (9)	Taipei Heping Basketball Gymnasium; 6,862	21–6
28	March 24	@Dreamers	L 79–92	Kenny Manigault (20)	Kenny Manigault (21)	Kenny Manigault (4)	Intercontinental Basketball Stadium; 2,586	21–7
29	March 28	Pilots	W 89–81	Kenny Manigault (25)	Quincy Davis (12)	Kenny Manigault (8)	Xinzhuang Gymnasium; 2,485	22–7

April : 4–4 (Home: 3–3; Road: 1–1)

Game	Date	Team	Score	High points	High rebounds	High assists	Location Attendance	Record
30	April 1	Pilots	W 90–87(OT)	Kenny Manigault (23)	Quincy Davis (14)	Kenny Manigault (7)	Xinzhuang Gymnasium; 3,126	23–7
31	April 2	Lioneers	L 73–98	Kenny Manigault (21)	Quincy Davis (14)	Lee K., J. Lin, Manigault (3)	Xinzhuang Gymnasium; 2,875	23–8
32	April 8	@Pilots	W 90–89	Kenny Manigault (28)	Kenny Manigault (9)	Hung Chih-Shan (6)	Taoyuan Arena; 2,896	24–8
33	April 15	Braves	L 68–89	Yang Chin-Min (19)	Quincy Davis (11)	Kenny Manigault (8)	Xinzhuang Gymnasium; 4,826	24–9
34	April 16	Steelers	L 85–92	Yang Chin-Min (22)	Su Shih-Hsuan (11)	Joseph Lin (5)	Xinzhuang Gymnasium; 6,800	24–10
35	April 23	@Steelers	L 110–116	Quincy Davis (24)	Quincy Davis (14)	Joseph Lin (11)	Fengshan Arena; 5,321	24–11
36	April 29	Lioneers	W 103–91	Kenny Manigault (23)	Byron Mullens (8)	Kenny Manigault (8)	Xinzhuang Gymnasium; 3,544	25–11
37	April 30	Steelers	W 104–100	Kenny Manigault (24)	Quincy Davis (11)	Joseph Lin (8)	Xinzhuang Gymnasium; 6,800	26–11

May : 1–2 (Home: 1–1; Road: 0–1)

Game	Date	Team	Score	High points	High rebounds	High assists	Location Attendance	Record
38	May 6	Dreamers	L 105–110	Byron Mullens (29)	Byron Mullens (21)	Hung Chih-Shan (8)	Xinzhuang Gymnasium; 3,717	26–12
PPD	May 7	Lioneers	Postponed					
39	May 9	Lioneers	W 104–95	Kenny Manigault (26)	Kenny Manigault (16)	Kenny Manigault (10)	Xinzhuang Gymnasium; 2,962	27–12
40	May 13	@Lioneers	L 95–110	Yang Chin-Min (21)	Omar Niang (7)	Joseph Lin (5)	Hsinchu County Stadium; 6,023	27–13

2022–23 schedule

=== Playoffs ===
2023 playoffs game log
Total: 5–5 (Home: 3–2; Road: 2–3)
Playoffs : 3–1 (Home: 2–0; Road: 1–1)

Game	Date	Team	Score	High points	High rebounds	High assists	Location Attendance	Record
1	May 19	Dreamers	W 103–84	Kenny Manigault (23)	Kenny Manigault (11)	Joseph Lin (7)	Xinzhuang Gymnasium; 5,538	1–0
2	May 21	Dreamers	W 102–83	Kenny Manigault (35)	Kenny Manigault (11)	Kenny Manigault (4)	Xinzhuang Gymnasium; 6,360	2–0
3	May 25	@Dreamers	L 95–115	Yang Chin-Min (24)	Kenny Manigault (9)	Kenny Manigault (6)	Intercontinental Basketball Stadium; 3,000	2–1
4	May 27	@Dreamers	W 108–100	Yang Chin-Min (25)	Quincy Davis (12)	Kenny Manigault (9)	Intercontinental Basketball Stadium; 3,000	3–1

Finals : 2–4 (Home: 1–2; Road: 1–2)

Game	Date	Team	Score	High points	High rebounds	High assists	Location Attendance	Record
1	June 3	Braves	W 86–72	Yang Chin-Min (24)	Byron Mullens (20)	J. Lin, Manigault (5)	Xinzhuang Gymnasium; 6,540	1–0
2	June 5	Braves	L 83–87	Joseph Lin (20)	Byron Mullens (12)	Joseph Lin (6)	Xinzhuang Gymnasium; 6,540	1–1
3	June 8	@Braves	L 91–97	Joseph Lin (20)	Byron Mullens (17)	Joseph Lin (5)	Taipei Heping Basketball Gymnasium; 7,000	1–2
4	June 10	@Braves	W 107–97	Byron Mullens (28)	Kenny Manigault (18)	Kenny Manigault (10)	Taipei Heping Basketball Gymnasium; 7,000	2–2
5	June 12	Braves	L 105–111	Byron Mullens (26)	Byron Mullens (11)	Kenny Manigault (8)	Xinzhuang Gymnasium; 6,540	2–3
6	June 14	@Braves	L 104–118	Joseph Lin (37)	Byron Mullens (10)	Kenny Manigault (9)	Taipei Heping Basketball Gymnasium; 7,000	2–4

2022–23 schedule

== Player statistics ==
Legend
GP	Games played	MPG	Minutes per game	2P%	2-point field goal percentage
3P%	3-point field goal percentage	FT%	Free throw percentage	RPG	Rebounds per game
APG	Assists per game	SPG	Steals per game	BPG	Blocks per game
PPG	Points per game		Led the league

=== Regular season ===
Player	GP	MPG	PPG	2P%	3P%	FT%	RPG	APG	SPG	BPG
Chen Chun-Nan	36	14:57	3.56	40.74%	16.28%	67.86%	2.17	0.83	0.69	0.03
Chien You-Che	38	17:19	5.95	39.51%	36.92%	72.00%	1.95	0.79	0.95	0.05
Quincy Davis	39	24:10	10.36	66.12%	33.66%	68.97%	8.54	1.36	0.90	1.10
Austin Daye	7	33:52	16.71	48.72%	35.19%	91.67%	8.43	2.86	1.14	1.71
Hung Chih-Shan	23	14:51	4.48	23.08%	39.24%	57.14%	1.35	2.39	0.48	0.00
Kao Cheng-En	3	02:17	2.33	100.00%	33.33%	0.00%	0.33	0.00	0.33	0.00
Lee Kai-Yan	34	26:35	8.91	36.18%	40.15%	66.67%	4.03	3.79	1.38	0.09
Li Ruei-Ci	5	06:11	1.00	25.00%	20.00%	0.00%	0.80	0.20	0.40	0.20
Li Wei-Ting	7	06:05	1.71	22.22%	20.00%	100.00%	0.43	0.43	0.14	0.00
Lin Chin-Pang	30	13:36	3.03	35.87%	16.67%	38.89%	2.10	0.90	0.77	0.03
Joseph Lin	37	31:41	11.84	43.87%	31.44%	62.07%	3.62	5.19	1.43	0.46
Lin Li-Jen	20	05:38	2.00	17.65%	25.64%	28.57%	0.65	0.25	0.45	0.00
Lin Shih-Hsuan	9	05:47	1.67	20.00%	28.57%	77.78%	0.78	0.67	0.11	0.00
Kenny Manigault	32	36:37	18.25	40.54%	31.79%	67.59%	9.44	6.00	3.59	0.59
Byron Mullens	30	33:17	21.47	58.73%	35.68%	64.96%	15.50	2.63	0.73	1.53
Omar Niang	23	10:52	1.26	31.71%	0.00%	33.33%	2.91	0.17	0.17	0.48
Su Shih-Hsuan	35	15:40	5.06	49.65%	20.00%	50.00%	3.49	0.80	0.54	0.17
Tseng Yu-Hao	5	12:25	3.60	53.33%	0.00%	25.00%	2.80	1.00	0.60	0.00
Yang Chin-Min	40	28:25	14.95	44.10%	33.82%	80.12%	3.60	2.60	0.75	0.00
Yang Hsing-Chih	23	08:18	1.61	53.13%	0.00%	25.00%	1.09	0.17	0.13	0.13

=== Playoffs ===
Player	GP	MPG	PPG	2P%	3P%	FT%	RPG	APG	SPG	BPG
Chen Chun-Nan	4	07:22	2.25	50.00%	25.00%	0.00%	1.75	0.50	0.00	0.00
Chien You-Che	4	13:57	3.50	50.00%	40.00%	0.00%	1.00	0.75	0.50	0.00
Quincy Davis	4	26:52	10.50	81.25%	33.33%	87.50%	8.25	1.75	0.25	1.25
Hung Chih-Shan	4	11:19	1.50	50.00%	16.67%	50.00%	0.75	1.50	0.25	0.00
Kao Cheng-En	Did not play									
Lee Kai-Yan	4	23:47	8.25	58.33%	25.00%	80.00%	2.50	2.25	0.75	0.00
Li Wei-Ting	Did not play									
Lin Chin-Pang	4	03:22	0.00	0.00%	0.00%	0.00%	0.25	0.50	0.00	0.00
Joseph Lin	4	32:37	13.50	51.61%	23.81%	50.00%	4.00	4.75	0.50	0.25
Lin Li-Jen	Did not play									
Lin Shih-Hsuan	3	02:13	1.67	50.00%	100.00%	0.00%	0.67	0.00	0.00	0.00
Kenny Manigault	4	41:20	22.50	40.00%	39.47%	90.00%	9.75	6.00	4.25	0.75
Byron Mullens	4	27:49	10.25	48.00%	15.79%	80.00%	9.00	1.25	0.25	1.00
Omar Niang	3	03:22	1.00	50.00%	0.00%	50.00%	1.00	0.00	0.00	0.00
Su Shih-Hsuan	4	17:16	6.75	44.44%	42.86%	50.00%	3.25	0.25	0.50	0.25
Tseng Yu-Hao	Did not play									
Yang Chin-Min	4	30:02	21.00	50.00%	50.00%	83.33%	4.75	2.00	0.50	0.00
Yang Hsing-Chih	Did not play									

=== Finals ===
Player	GP	MPG	PPG	2P%	3P%	FT%	RPG	APG	SPG	BPG
Chen Chun-Nan	2	03:36	0.00	0.00%	0.00%	0.00%	0.50	0.00	0.00	0.50
Chien You-Che	6	10:51	1.00	20.00%	11.11%	50.00%	0.67	0.17	0.33	0.00
Quincy Davis	6	26:50	10.50	65.63%	33.33%	75.00%	7.50	0.33	0.50	0.67
Hung Chih-Shan	6	11:12	1.50	0.00%	18.75%	0.00%	1.00	1.50	0.33	0.00
Kao Cheng-En	Did not play									
Lee Kai-Yan	6	26:08	7.50	31.82%	26.92%	76.92%	1.83	1.67	2.00	0.83
Li Wei-Ting	Did not play									
Lin Chin-Pang	4	10:12	2.50	83.33%	0.00%	0.00%	0.50	0.00	0.25	0.00
Joseph Lin	6	37:52	18.67	46.77%	40.00%	80.00%	3.50	4.33	0.83	0.50
Lin Li-Jen	2	00:31	0.00	0.00%	0.00%	0.00%	0.00	0.00	0.00	0.00
Lin Shih-Hsuan	Did not play									
Kenny Manigault	6	35:06	14.67	48.08%	23.33%	73.91%	7.33	6.67	2.83	0.17
Byron Mullens	6	36:34	20.17	62.00%	42.86%	88.46%	13.67	1.67	0.83	0.83
Omar Niang	2	00:31	0.00	0.00%	0.00%	0.00%	0.00	0.00	0.00	0.00
Su Shih-Hsuan	5	14:34	3.60	25.00%	20.00%	83.33%	3.00	0.00	0.20	0.60
Tseng Yu-Hao	Did not play									
Yang Chin-Min	6	34:53	17.33	52.27%	40.00%	80.00%	4.00	1.83	0.83	0.00
Yang Hsing-Chih	Did not play									

== Transactions ==
=== Trades ===
August 8, 2022
To New Taipei Kings

- Joseph Lin
To Taipei Fubon Braves

- Steven Guinchard
- Hung Kai-Chieh
- 2024 protected first-round pick

=== Free Agency ===
==== Re-signed ====
Date	Player	Contract terms	Ref.
August 22, 2022	Byron Mullens	—	
December 1, 2022	Hung Chih-Shan	—	

==== Additions ====
Date	Player	Contract terms	Former team	Ref.
July 18, 2022	Su Shih-Hsuan	—	Bank of Taiwan	
August 24, 2022	DaJuan Summers	—	(Iran) Mahram Tehran	
August 26, 2022	Jamel Artis	—	(South Africa) Cape Town Tigers	
September 1, 2022	Lin Chin-Pang	—	Taoyuan Pilots	
September 2, 2022	Li Wei-Ting	—	SHU Tigers	
September 9, 2022	Kao Cheng-En	—	UCH	
October 29, 2022	Kenny Manigault	—	(Finland) Helsinki Seagulls	
November 10, 2022	Austin Daye	—	(Italy) Reyer Venezia	

==== Subtractions ====
Date	Player	Reason	New Team	Ref.
—	Jerran Young	—	—	
August 4, 2022	Thomas Welsh	contract expired	(Japan) Passlab Yamagata Wyverns	
August 16, 2022	DeAndre Liggins	contract expired	(Saudi Arabia) Al-Ahli	
October 25, 2022	Jamel Artis	waived	(Kosovo) KB Trepça	
November 10, 2022	DaJuan Summers	waived	(Lebanon) Homenetmen Beirut	
March 9, 2023	Austin Daye	mutual agreement to part ways	(Italy) Victoria Libertas Pesaro	

== Awards ==
=== End-of-Season Awards ===
Recipient	Award	Ref.
Byron Mullens	Rebounds Leader	
Byron Mullens	Import of the Year	
Byron Mullens	All-PLG Team	
Kenny Manigault	Steals Leader	
Kenny Manigault	All-PLG Second Team	
Joseph Lin	Best Dressed of the Year	
Joseph Lin	All-PLG Team	
Ryan Marchand	Coach of the Year	
Yang Chin-Min	Most Valuable Player	
Yang Chin-Min	All-PLG Team	
Quincy Davis	All-PLG Second Team	

=== Players of the Week ===
Week	Recipient	Date awarded	Ref.
Week 10	Joseph Lin	January 6 - January 8	
Week 19	Kenny Manigault	March 10 - March 12	

=== Players of the Month ===
Recipient	Award	Month awarded	Ref.
Byron Mullens	November Most Valuable Player	November	
Byron Mullens	February Most Valuable Player	February	
