= 1967–68 LSU Tigers basketball team =

American college basketball season

1967–68 LSU Tigers basketball
- Conference: Southeastern Conference
- Record: 14–12 (8–10 SEC)
- Head coach: Press Maravich (2nd season)
- Home arena: John M. Parker Agricultural Coliseum

1967–68 Southeastern Conference men's basketball standings
	Conf.				Overall
Team	W		L	PCT	W		L	PCT
No. 5 Kentucky	15	–	3	.833	22	–	5	.815
Tennessee	13	–	5	.722	20	–	6	.769
Vanderbilt	12	–	6	.667	20	–	6	.769
Georgia	11	–	7	.611	17	–	8	.680
Florida	11	–	7	.611	15	–	10	.600
LSU	8	–	10	.444	14	–	12	.538
Auburn	8	–	10	.444	13	–	13	.500
Mississippi State	5	–	13	.278	9	–	17	.346
Ole Miss	4	–	14	.222	7	–	17	.292
Alabama	3	–	15	.167	10	–	16	.385
Rankings from AP Poll

The 1967–68 LSU Tigers basketball team represented Louisiana State University as a member of the Southeastern Conference during the 1967–68 NCAA men's basketball season. The team's head coach was Press Maravich, in his second season at LSU. They played their home games at the John M. Parker Agricultural Coliseum in Baton Rouge, Louisiana. The Tigers finished the season 14–12, 8–10 in SEC play to finish in sixth place.

This season marked the varsity debut of "Pistol" Pete Maravich.

== Roster ==
1967–68 LSU Tigers men's basketball team
Players
Coaches

Pos.	#	Name	Height	Weight	Year	Hometown
G		Jeff Tribbett	6 ft 0 in (1.83 m)	—	So	Lebanon, Indiana
G	23	Pete Maravich	6 ft 5 in (1.96 m)	190 lb (86 kg)	So	Aliquippa, Pennsylvania
G	24	Rich Hickman	6 ft 0 in (1.83 m)	—	So
G/F	31	Ralph Jukkola	6 ft 3 in (1.91 m)	—	Jr	Dayton, Ohio
C	43	Dave Ramsden	6 ft 7 in (2.01 m)	—	Jr

Head coach

- Press Maravich

Assistant coach(es)

Legend

- (C) Team captain
- (S) Suspended
- (I) Ineligible
- (W) Walk-on
- Injured
- Current redshirt

Roster

== Schedule and results ==
Date time, TV	Rank^{#}	Opponent^{#}	Result	Record	High points	High rebounds	High assists	Site city, state
Regular season
Dec 2, 1967*		Tampa	W 97–81	1–0	48 – Maravich	–	–	John Parker Memorial Coliseum; Baton Rouge, Louisiana
Dec 4, 1967*		at Texas	W 87–74	2–0	42 – Maravich	–	–	Gregory Gym; Austin, Texas
Dec 9, 1967*		Loyola (LA)	W 90–56	3–0	51 – Maravich	–	–	John Parker Memorial Coliseum; Baton Rouge, Louisiana
Dec 15, 1967*		vs. Wisconsin; Milwaukee Classic	L 94–96	3–1	42 – Maravich	–	–	Milwaukee Arena; Milwaukee, Wisconsin
Dec 16, 1967*		vs. Florida State; Milwaukee Classic	L 100–130	3–2	42 – Maravich	–	–	Milwaukee Arena; Milwaukee, Wisconsin
Dec 19, 1967		Ole Miss	W 81–68	4–2 (1–0)	46 – Maravich	–	–	John Parker Memorial Coliseum; Baton Rouge, Louisiana
Dec 22, 1967		Mississippi State	W 111–87	5–2 (2–0)	58 – Maravich	–	–	John Parker Memorial Coliseum; Baton Rouge, Louisiana
Dec 30, 1967		Alabama	W 81–70	6–2 (3–0)	30 – Maravich	–	–	John Parker Memorial Coliseum; Baton Rouge, Louisiana
Jan 3, 1968		Auburn	W 76–72	7–2 (4–0)	55 – Maravich	–	–	John Parker Memorial Coliseum; Baton Rouge, Louisiana
Jan 6, 1968		at Florida	L 90–97	7–3 (4–1)	32 – Maravich	–	–	Florida Gymnasium; Gainesville, Florida
Jan 8, 1968		at Georgia	W 79–76	8–3 (5–1)	42 – Maravich	–	–	Stegeman Coliseum; Athens, Georgia
Jan 11, 1968*		at Tulane	W 100–91	9–3	52 – Maravich	–	–	Avron B. Fogelman Arena; New Orleans, Louisiana
Jan 24, 1968*		Clemson	W 104–81	10–3	33 – Maravich	–	–	John Parker Memorial Coliseum; Baton Rouge, Louisiana
Jan 27, 1968		No. 9 Kentucky	L 95–121	10–4 (5–2)	52 – Maravich	11 – Maravich	–	John Parker Memorial Coliseum; Baton Rouge, Louisiana
Jan 29, 1968		No. 7 Vanderbilt	L 91–99	10–5 (5–3)	54 – Maravich	–	–	John Parker Memorial Coliseum; Baton Rouge, Louisiana
Feb 3, 1968		at No. 10 Kentucky	L 96–109	10–6 (5–4)	44 – Maravich	9 – Jukkola	–	Memorial Coliseum; Lexington, Kentucky
Feb 5, 1968		No. 6 Tennessee	L 67–87	10–7 (5–5)	21 – Maravich	–	–	John Parker Memorial Coliseum; Baton Rouge, Louisiana
Feb 7, 1968		at Auburn	L 69–74	10–8 (5–6)	49 – Maravich	–	–	Auburn Sports Arena; Auburn, Alabama
Feb 10, 1968		Florida	W 93–92	11–8 (6–6)	47 – Maravich	–	–	John Parker Memorial Coliseum; Baton Rouge, Louisiana
Feb 12, 1968		Georgia	L 73–78	11–9 (6–7)	51 – Maravich	–	–	John Parker Memorial Coliseum; Baton Rouge, Louisiana
Feb 17, 1968		at Alabama	W 99–89	12–9 (7–7)	59 – Maravich	–	–	Foster Auditorium; Tuscaloosa, Alabama
Feb 19, 1968		at Mississippi State	W 94–83	13–9 (8–7)	34 – Maravich	–	–	McCarthy Gymnasium; Starkville, Mississippi
Feb 21, 1968*		Tulane	W 99–92	14–9	55 – Maravich	–	–	John Parker Memorial Coliseum; Baton Rouge, Louisiana
Feb 24, 1968		at Ole Miss	L 85–87	14–10 (8–8)	40 – Maravich	–	–	Tad Smith Coliseum; Oxford, Mississippi
Mar 2, 1968		at Tennessee	L 71–74	14–11 (8–9)	22 – Jukkola	–	–	Stokely Athletic Center; Knoxville, Tennessee
Mar 4, 1968		at Vanderbilt	L 86–115	14–12 (8–10)	42 – Maravich	–	–	Memorial Gymnasium; Nashville, Tennessee
*Non-conference game. ^{#}Rankings from AP Poll. (#) Tournament seedings in parentheses.

== Awards and honors ==
- Pete Maravich – Consensus First-team All-American, NCAA Scoring Leader, SEC Player of the Year, All-time single-season NCAA scoring average (43.8 ppg)
