= 1968–69 LSU Tigers basketball team =

American college basketball season

1968–69 LSU Tigers basketball

All-College Tournament champions
- Conference: Southeastern Conference
- Record: 13–13 (7–11 SEC)
- Head coach: Press Maravich (3rd season)
- Home arena: John M. Parker Agricultural Coliseum

1968–69 Southeastern Conference men's basketball standings
| | Conf. | | | | Overall |
| Team | W | | L | PCT | W | | L | PCT |
|---|---|---|---|---|---|---|---|---|
| No. 7 Kentucky | 16 | – | 2 | .889 | 23 | – | 5 | .821 |
| Tennessee | 13 | – | 5 | .722 | 21 | – | 7 | .750 |
| Florida | 12 | – | 6 | .667 | 18 | – | 9 | .667 |
| Auburn | 10 | – | 8 | .556 | 15 | – | 10 | .600 |
| Vanderbilt | 9 | – | 9 | .500 | 15 | – | 11 | .577 |
| Georgia | 9 | – | 9 | .500 | 13 | – | 12 | .520 |
| LSU | 7 | – | 11 | .389 | 13 | – | 13 | .500 |
| Ole Miss | 7 | – | 11 | .389 | 10 | – | 14 | .417 |
| Mississippi State | 6 | – | 12 | .333 | 8 | – | 17 | .320 |
| Alabama | 1 | – | 17 | .056 | 4 | – | 20 | .167 |
Rankings from AP Poll

The 1968–69 LSU Tigers basketball team represented Louisiana State University as a member of the Southeastern Conference during the 1968–69 NCAA men's basketball season. The team’s head coach was Press Maravich, in his third season at LSU. They played their home games at the John M. Parker Agricultural Coliseum in Baton Rouge, Louisiana. The Tigers finished the season 13–13, 7–11 in SEC play to finish in seventh place.

== Roster ==
1968–69 LSU Tigers men's basketball team
Players
Coaches

| Pos. | # | Name | Height | Weight | Year | Hometown |
|---|---|---|---|---|---|---|
| G | | Jeff Tribbett | 6 ft 0 in (1.83 m) | — | Jr | Lebanon, Indiana |
| G | 23 | Pete Maravich | 6 ft 5 in (1.96 m) | 190 lb (86 kg) | Jr | Aliquippa, Pennsylvania |
| G | 24 | Rich Hickman | 6 ft 0 in (1.83 m) | — | Jr |
| G/F | 31 | Ralph Jukkola | 6 ft 3 in (1.91 m) | — | Sr | Dayton, Ohio |
| C | 35 | Dan Hester | 6 ft 8 in (2.03 m) | 210 lb (95 kg) | Jr | Mount Vernon, Illinois |
| C | 43 | Dave Ramsden | 6 ft 7 in (2.01 m) | — | Sr |

Head coach

- Press Maravich

Assistant coach(es)

Legend

- (C) Team captain
- (S) Suspended
- (I) Ineligible
- (W) Walk-on
- Injured
- Current redshirt

Roster

== Schedule and results ==
| Date time, TV | Rank^{#} | Opponent^{#} | Result | Record | High points | High rebounds | High assists | Site city, state |
Regular season
| Dec 2, 1968* | | at Loyola (LA) | W 109–82 | 1–0 | 52 – Maravich | – | – | The Field House; New Orleans, Louisiana |
| Dec 7, 1968* | | at Clemson | W 86–85 | 2–0 | 38 – Maravich | – | – | Littlejohn Coliseum; Clemson, South Carolina |
| Dec 14, 1968* | | Tulane | L 99–101 | 2–1 | 55 – Maravich | – | – | John M. Parker Agricultural Coliseum; Baton Rouge, Louisiana |
| Dec 18, 1968 | | Florida | W 93–89 | 3–1 (1–0) | 45 – Maravich | – | – | John M. Parker Agricultural Coliseum; Baton Rouge, Louisiana |
| Dec 21, 1968 | | Georgia | W 98–89 | 4–1 (2–0) | 47 – Maravich | – | – | John M. Parker Agricultural Coliseum; Baton Rouge, Louisiana |
| Dec 26, 1968* | | vs. No. 19 Wyoming; All-College Tournament | W 84–78 | 5–1 | 45 – Maravich | – | – | Fairgrounds Arena; Oklahoma City, Oklahoma |
| Dec 28, 1968* | | at Oklahoma City; All-College Tournament | W 101–85 | 6–1 | 40 – Maravich | – | – | Fairgrounds Arena; Oklahoma City, Oklahoma |
| Dec 30, 1968* | | vs. Duquesne; All-College Tournament | W 94–91 | 7–1 | 53 – Maravich | – | – | Fairgrounds Arena; Oklahoma City, Oklahoma |
| Jan 4, 1969 | | at Alabama | L 82–85 | 7–2 (2–1) | 42 – Maravich | – | – | Coleman Coliseum; Tuscaloosa, Alabama |
| Jan 9, 1969 | | at Vanderbilt | L 92–94 | 7–3 (2–2) | 38 – Maravich | – | – | Memorial Gymnasium; Nashville, Tennessee |
| Jan 11, 1969 | | at Auburn | L 71–90 | 7–4 (2–3) | 46 – Maravich | – | – | Auburn Sports Arena; Auburn, Alabama |
| Jan 25, 1969 | | No. 5 Kentucky | L 96–108 | 7–5 (2–4) | 52 – Maravich | 14 – Ramsden | – | John M. Parker Agricultural Coliseum; Baton Rouge, Louisiana |
| Jan 27, 1969 | | Tennessee | L 68–81 | 7–6 (2–5) | 21 – Maravich | – | – | John M. Parker Agricultural Coliseum; Baton Rouge, Louisiana |
| Jan 31, 1969* | | Pittsburgh | W 120–79 | 8–6 | 40 – Maravich | – | – | John M. Parker Agricultural Coliseum; Baton Rouge, Louisiana |
| Feb 1, 1969 | | Ole Miss | L 81–84 | 8–7 (2–6) | 31 – Maravich | – | – | John M. Parker Agricultural Coliseum; Baton Rouge, Louisiana |
| Feb 3, 1969 | | Mississippi State | W 95–71 | 9–7 (3–6) | 33 – Maravich | – | – | John M. Parker Agricultural Coliseum; Baton Rouge, Louisiana |
| Feb 8, 1969 | | Alabama | W 81–75 | 10–7 (4–6) | 38 – Maravich | – | – | John M. Parker Agricultural Coliseum; Baton Rouge, Louisiana |
| Feb 10, 1969 | | at Tulane | L 94–110 | 10–8 | 66 – Maravich | – | – | Avron B. Fogelman Arena; New Orleans, Louisiana |
| Feb 12, 1969 | | at Florida | L 79–95 | 10–9 (4–7) | 50 – Maravich | – | – | Florida Gymnasium; Gainesville, Florida |
| Feb 15, 1969 | | Auburn | W 93–81 | 11–9 (5–7) | 54 – Maravich | – | – | John M. Parker Agricultural Coliseum; Baton Rouge, Louisiana |
| Feb 17, 1969 | | Vanderbilt | L 83–85 | 11–10 (5–8) | 35 – Maravich | – | – | John M. Parker Agricultural Coliseum; Baton Rouge, Louisiana |
| Feb 22, 1969 | | at No. 6 Kentucky | L 89–103 | 11–11 (5–9) | 45 – Maravich | 15 – Hester | – | Memorial Coliseum (11,500); Lexington, Kentucky |
| Feb 24, 1969 | | at No. 17 Tennessee | L 63–87 | 11–12 (5–10) | 20 – Maravich | – | – | Stokely Athletic Center; Knoxville, Tennessee |
| Mar 1, 1969 | | at Ole Miss | L 76–78 | 11–13 (5–11) | 49 – Maravich | – | – | Tad Smith Coliseum; Oxford, Mississippi |
| Mar 3, 1969 | | at Mississippi State | W 99–89 | 12–13 (6–11) | 55 – Maravich | – | – | McCarthy Gymnasium; Starkville, Mississippi |
| Mar 8, 1969 | | at Georgia | W 90–80 | 13–13 (7–11) | 58 – Maravich | – | – | Stegeman Coliseum; Athens, Georgia |
*Non-conference game. ^{#}Rankings from AP Poll. (#) Tournament seedings in parentheses.

== Awards and honors ==
- Pete Maravich – Consensus First-team All-American (2x), NCAA Scoring Leader (2x), SEC Player of the Year (2x), All-time single-season NCAA scoring average (44.2 ppg)
