= Al Sanders (basketball) =

American basketball player (1950–1994)

Personal information
- Born: January 1, 1950 Baton Rouge, Louisiana, U.S.
- Died: May 4, 1994 (aged 44)
- Listed height: 6 ft 7 in (2.01 m)
- Listed weight: 240 lb (109 kg)

Career information
- High school: Baton Rouge (Baton Rouge, Louisiana)
- College: LSU (1969–1972)
- NBA draft: 1972: 4th round, 56th overall pick
- Drafted by: Baltimore Bullets
- Position: Power forward
- Number: 3

Career history
- 1972–1973: Virginia Squires

Career highlights
- First-team All-SEC (1971); Second-team All-SEC (1972)
- Stats at Basketball Reference

Albert T. Sanders III (January 1, 1950 – May 4, 1994) was an American basketball player who played briefly in the original American Basketball Association (ABA).

Born and raised in Baton Rouge, Louisiana, Sanders played college basketball for the LSU Tigers and played for Virginia Squires of the ABA. He appeared in 4 games during the 1972–73 season, averaging 2.0 Points per game.
