= Kenny Higgs =

American basketball player (born 1955)

Personal information
- Born: January 31, 1955 (age 71) Owensboro, Kentucky
- Listed height: 6 ft 0 in (1.83 m)
- Listed weight: 180 lb (82 kg)

Career information
- High school: Owensboro (Owensboro, Kentucky)
- College: LSU (1974–1978)
- NBA draft: 1978: 3rd round, 57th overall pick
- Drafted by: Cleveland Cavaliers
- Playing career: 1978–1985
- Position: Point guard
- Number: 1

Career history
- 1978–1979: Cleveland Cavaliers
- 1979–1980: Utica Olympics
- 1980–1982: Denver Nuggets
- 1982–1984: Detroit Spirits
- 1984–1985: Evansville Thunder

Career highlights
- CBA champion (1983); Second-team Parade All-American (1974)
- Stats at NBA.com
- Stats at Basketball Reference

Kenneth Lee Higgs Jr. (born January 31, 1955) is an American former professional basketball player who played three seasons in the National Basketball Association (NBA) for the Cleveland Cavaliers and Denver Nuggets. He is a 6-foot-0-inch (183 cm) 180 pounds (82 kg) point guard and he played collegiately at Louisiana State University. Higgs was selected by the Cavaliers with the 13th pick in the third round in the 1978 NBA draft. He shares the Southeastern Conference single-game assists record (19: Phil Pressey, 2012–13 Missouri; Bill Hann, 1967–68 Tennessee).

Higgs's best season was in 1980–81 with the 1980–81 Nuggets when he averaged 7.8 points, 2.0 rebounds and 5.7 assists per game. He also played several seasons in the Continental Basketball Association (CBA) for the Utica Olympics, Detroit Spirits and Evansville Thunder. He won a CBA championship with the Spirits in 1983.

Born in Owensboro, Kentucky, Higgs led Owensboro High School to the 1972 KHSAA Sweet Sixteen State Championship with a 71–63 win over Elizabethtown at Freedom Hall in Louisville, Kentucky.

His brother, Mark Higgs, is a former NFL running back.

== Career statistics ==
Legend
GP	Games played	GS	Games started	MPG	Minutes per game
FG%	Field goal percentage	3P%	3-point field goal percentage	FT%	Free throw percentage
RPG	Rebounds per game	APG	Assists per game	SPG	Steals per game
BPG	Blocks per game	PPG	Points per game	**Bold**	Career high

=== NBA ===
==== Regular season ====
Year	Team	GP	GS	MPG	FG%	3P%	FT%	RPG	APG	SPG	BPG	PPG
1978–79	Cleveland	68		15.4	**.455**		.766	1.5	2.1	1.0	**.2**	5.0
1980–81	Denver	72		**23.5**	.441	.118	.814	**2.0**	**5.7**	**1.4**	.1	**7.8**
1981–82	Denver	**76**	**49**	22.3	.432	**.190**	**.817**	1.9	5.2	1.0	.1	7.5
Career		216	49	20.5	.441	.145	.804	1.8	4.4	1.1	.1	6.8

==== Playoffs ====
Year	Team	GP	MPG	FG%	3P%	FT%	RPG	APG	SPG	BPG	PPG
1982	Denver	3	18.0	.381	.000	.583	1.0	2.0	1.0	.0	7.7
