= Chris Johnson (basketball, born 1985) =

American basketball player (born 1985)

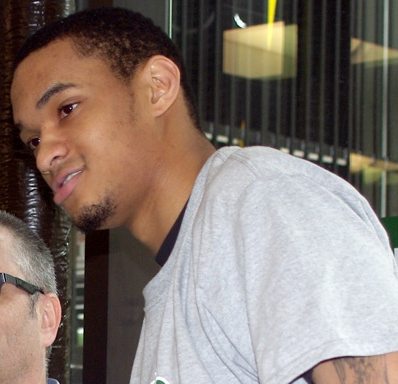
- Johnson in 2011

No. 5 – Auckland Tuatara
- Position: Center / power forward
- League: NZNBL

Personal information
- Born: July 17, 1985 (age 41) Washington, D.C., U.S.
- Listed height: 6 ft 11 in (2.11 m)
- Listed weight: 231 lb (105 kg)

Career information
- High school: Colonial Beach (Westmoreland County, Virginia); Laurinburg Institute (Laurinburg, North Carolina)
- College: LSU (2005–2009)
- NBA draft: 2009: undrafted
- Playing career: 2009–present

Career history
- 2009: Aliağa Petkim
- 2010: Turów Zgorzelec
- 2010–2011: Dakota Wizards
- 2011: Portland Trail Blazers
- 2011: Boston Celtics
- 2011–2012: Portland Trail Blazers
- 2011: Leones de Santo Domingo
- 2012: New Orleans Hornets
- 2012–2013: Santa Cruz Warriors
- 2013: Minnesota Timberwolves
- 2013–2014: Zhejiang Lions
- 2014: Zhejiang Golden Bulls
- 2015: Türk Telekom
- 2016: Capitanes de Arecibo
- 2017: Anhui Dragons
- 2017–2018: Cedevita Zagreb
- 2018–2019: Homenetmen Beirut B.C.
- 2019–2020: Shabab Al Ahli
- 2020: SeaHorses Mikawa
- 2021: Al-Muharraq SC
- 2021: Auckland Huskies
- 2021: Parque Hostos
- 2021–2022: Al-Nassr BC
- 2022: Auckland Tuatara
- 2022–2024: Taipei Fubon Braves
- 2024–2025: New Taipei Kings
- 2026: Al-Nassr BC
- 2026–present: Auckland Tuatara

Career highlights
- Croatian Cup winner (2018); CBA Slam Dunk Contest champion (2014); LNB champion (2011); NZNBL All-Star Five (2022); NBA D-League All-Star (2011); All-NBA D-League First Team (2011); NBA D-League Defensive Player of the Year (2011); NBA D-League All-Defensive First Team (2011); SEC All-Defensive Team (2009)
- Stats at NBA.com
- Stats at Basketball Reference

Chris Anthony Johnson (born July 17, 1985) is an American professional basketball player for the Auckland Tuatara of the New Zealand National Basketball League (NZNBL). He played college basketball for the LSU Tigers before having multiple stints in the NBA between 2011 and 2013.

== High school and college ==
Born in Washington, D.C., Johnson attended Colonial Beach High School in Westmoreland County, Virginia, where he averaged 22.2 points and 12.5 rebounds in his final season. He was then part of Laurinburg Institute's prep school national championship team under coach Chris Chaney in 2005. He averaged 8.6 points, 3.9 rebounds and 2.7 blocks per game as a senior and shot 42 percent from three-point range.

Johnson played college basketball for the LSU Tigers from 2005 to 2009. In 85 games, he made 59 starts and averaged 7.2 points, 5.2 rebounds and 2.0 blocks in 20.4 minutes per game. With 176 blocks, he finished his four-year career as the second all-time leader in blocked shots at LSU behind Shaquille O'Neal (412).

== Professional career ==
=== 2009–10 season ===
After going undrafted in the 2009 NBA draft, Johnson joined the New Jersey Nets for the NBA Summer League. He started the 2009–10 season in Turkey with Aliağa Petkim before ending the season in Poland with Turów Zgorzelec.

=== 2010–11 season ===
After a quick pre-season stint with the Boston Celtics, Johnson joined the Dakota Wizards of the NBA D-League. In 35 games for the Wizards during the 2010–11 season, he averaged 16.2 points, 9.2 rebounds, 1.3 assists and 2.8 blocks per game.

On January 24, 2011, Johnson signed a 10-day contract with the Portland Trail Blazers. A month later, he signed a 10-day contract with the Celtics. On March 14, he re-signed with the Trail Blazers for the remainder of the 2010–11 season.

=== 2011–12 season ===
During the 2011 NBA lockout, Johnson played for and won a championship in the Dominican Republic with Leones de Santo Domingo of the Liga Nacional de Baloncesto (LNB). Following the lockout, he re-joined the Trail Blazers for the 2011–12 season.

On March 15, 2012, Johnson was waived by the Trail Blazers. On March 20, he was claimed off waivers by the New Orleans Hornets. On April 18, 2012, he was waived by the Hornets.

=== 2012–13 season ===
After playing for the NBA D-League Select Team in the Las Vegas Summer League and spending pre-season with the Minnesota Timberwolves, Johnson joined the Santa Cruz Warriors of the NBA D-League for the 2012–13 season.

On January 19, 2013, Johnson signed a 10-day contract with the Timberwolves. He went on to sign a second 10-day contract and a rest-of-season contract with Minnesota.

=== 2013–14 season ===
After playing for the Timberwolves in the Las Vegas Summer League and spending pre-season with the team, Johnson was waived on October 26, 2013. In November 2013, he moved to China to play for the Zhejiang Lions.

=== 2014–15 season ===
After spending pre-season with the Miami Heat, Johnson returned to China for the start of the 2014–15 season to play for the Zhejiang Golden Bulls as a short-term injury replacement for Charles Gaines. Following the return of Gaines, he left the Golden Bulls in mid-December after appearing in 11 games.

On January 20, 2015, Johnson signed with Turkish team Türk Telekom for the rest of the season.

=== 2015–16 season ===
On September 28, 2015, Johnson signed with the Cleveland Cavaliers. However, he was later waived by the Cavaliers on October 17 after appearing in four preseason games.

On February 15, 2016, Johnson signed with Capitanes de Arecibo of the Puerto Rican League.

=== 2016–17 season ===
In July 2016, Johnson played for the Portland Trail Blazers in the Las Vegas Summer League.

=== 2017–18 season ===
Between June and October 2017, Johnson played in China for the Anhui Dragons of the NBL. He then moved to Croatia for the 2017–18 season to play for Cedevita Zagreb.

=== 2018–19 season ===
Between October 2018 and January 2019, Johnson played in Lebanon for Homenetmen Beirut B.C. In April 2019, he played for Shabab Al Ahli during the FIBA Asia Champions Cup GBA Qualifiers.

=== 2019–20 season ===
Johnson returned to Shabab Al Ahli for the 2019–10 season. In January 2020, he moved to Japan to play for SeaHorses Mikawa.

=== 2020–21 season ===
In March 2021, Johnson had a short stint in Bahrain with Al-Muharraq SC.

On April 20, 2021, Johnson signed with the Auckland Huskies for the 2021 New Zealand NBL season. He left the Huskies on July 8 to return to the United States to play in the Big3 league. He averaged 20.1 points, 11.0 rebounds, 2.9 assists and 1.7 blocks per game with the Huskies.

=== 2021–22 season ===
After a stint in the Dominican Republic with Parque Hostos, Johnson moved to Saudi Arabia in December 2021 to play for Al-Nassr BC. In 15 games, he averaged 25.1 points, 15.7 rebounds, 3.7 assists and 1.7 blocks per game.

On April 21, 2022, Johnson signed with the Auckland Tuatara for the 2022 New Zealand NBL season, returning to the rebranded Auckland franchise. He left the team mid-season to return to the Big3 league, but then returned to the Tuatara for the final regular season game and finals.

=== 2022–23 season ===
On August 23, 2022, Johnson signed with Taipei Fubon Braves of the P. League+.

=== 2023–24 season ===
Johnson returned to Taipei Fubon Braves for the 2023–24 season.

=== 2024–25 season ===
On July 24, 2024, Johnson signed with New Taipei Kings of the Taiwan Professional Basketball League (TPBL). On April 3, 2025, Johnson was not registered in the 2024–25 TPBL season final rosters. But Johnson would play for 2025 Basketball Champions League Asia-East. On June 8, New Taipei Kings announced that Johnson had left the team.

=== 2025–26 season ===
In January 2026, Johnson joined Al-Nassr BC in Saudi Arabia.

On April 9, 2026, Johnson signed with the Auckland Tuatara for the 2026 New Zealand NBL season, returning to the franchise for a third stint.

== NBA career statistics ==
Legend
GP	Games played	GS	Games started	MPG	Minutes per game
FG%	Field goal percentage	3P%	3-point field goal percentage	FT%	Free throw percentage
RPG	Rebounds per game	APG	Assists per game	SPG	Steals per game
BPG	Blocks per game	PPG	Points per game	**Bold**	Career high

=== Regular season ===
Year	Team	GP	GS	MPG	FG%	3P%	FT%	RPG	APG	SPG	BPG	PPG
2010–11	Portland	10	**1**	10.6	.389	.000	.722	2.7	.2	.3	.6	2.7
2010–11	Boston	4	0	8.0	**.667**	.000	**1.000**	1.3	**.3**	.0	.8	1.5
2011–12	Portland	20	0	4.7	.478	.000	.833	.9	.1	.1	.4	1.6
2011–12	New Orleans	7	0	**11.7**	.500	.000	.714	**3.1**	.1	**.7**	.1	3.3
2012–13	Minnesota	**30**	0	9.5	.640	.000	.618	2.0	**.3**	.2	**.9**	**3.9**
Career		71	1	8.4	.562	.000	.699	1.9	.2	.2	.6	2.9

=== Playoffs ===
Year	Team	GP	GS	MPG	FG%	3P%	FT%	RPG	APG	SPG	BPG	PPG
2011	Portland	4	0	4.8	1.000	.000	1.000	1.3	.0	.0	.5	1.0
Career		4	0	4.8	1.000	.000	1.000	1.3	.0	.0	.5	1.0

== Personal life ==
Johnson's wife Tammy is from Takapuna, New Zealand. The couple have twins that were born in 2020.
