= Auburn Sports Arena =

Multi-purpose arena in Auburn, Alabama

Coordinates: 32°36′03″N 85°29′18″W

- The Barn
- Interactive map of Auburn Sports Arena
- Location: Auburn, Alabama
- Owner: Auburn University
- Operator: Auburn University
- Capacity: 2,500

Construction
- Opened: 1946
- Demolished: September 21, 1996

Tenants
- Auburn Tigers (NCAA); Men's basketball (1946–1969); Women's gymnastics

Auburn Sports Arena was a 2,500 seat multi-purpose arena in Auburn, Alabama. Nicknamed "The Barn," it opened in 1946. It was home to the Auburn University Tigers basketball team. It was replaced when the Beard–Eaves–Memorial Coliseum opened in 1968.

After it closed, it continued to host Auburn's women's gymnastics team.

In 1996, the Auburn Sports Arena was destroyed by a fire that occurred during the Auburn-LSU football game. The fire was likely started by the embers of a tailgater's grill.

The site has since been replaced with a parking deck.
