= Fengshan Arena =

Stadium in Fengshan, Kaohsiung, Taiwan

- 高雄市鳳山體育館
- Fengshan Gymnasium
- Interactive map of Fengshan Arena
- Full name: Kaohsiung City Fengshan Gymnasium
- Address: No. 65, Tiyu Road, Fengshan District; Kaohsiung
- Location: Fongshan, Kaohsiung, Taiwan
- Coordinates: 22°37′15.9″N 120°21′16.3″E
- Operator: Kaohsiung City Government Sports Department
- Capacity: 5300
- Type: stadium
- Public transit: Kaohsiung Metro: Fongshan

Construction
- Opened: 1976
- Renovated: 2017

Tenant
- Kaohsiung Aquas (T1) (2022, 2024)

The Fengshan Arena (Chinese: 高雄市立鳳山體育館; pinyin: Gāoxióng Shìlì Fèngshān Tǐyùchǎng), is an indoor sporting arena located in Fongshan District, Kaohsiung, Taiwan. It is part of the Fengshan Sports Park, which includes the indoor Fengshan arena, Fongshan Stadium football pitch, running track, ice rink, Fengxi Sports Park, tennis courts and other sporting facilities.

== Construction ==
The sports complex underwent significant renovations in Nov 2017. The area was reopened in March 2018. The arena is mostly for volleyball and basketball and serves as the home of the Kaohsung 17LIVE Steelers. The stadium is able to hold 5,300 people and was opened in 1976.

== Transportation ==
The arena is accessible by walking about 700m (2300ft) South of exit 1 of the Fongshan Station of the Kaohsiung MRT.

== See also ==
- Fongshan Stadium
- List of stadiums in Taiwan
- Sports in Taiwan
