= Kaohsiung 17LIVE Steelers all-time roster =

The following is a list of players, both past and current, who appeared at least in one game for the Kaohsiung 17LIVE Steelers (2021–present) franchise.

== Players ==
G	Guard	G/F	Guard-forward	F	Forward	F/C	Forward-center	C	Center

^{x}	Denotes player who is currently on the Kaohsiung 17LIVE Steelers roster

=== B ===
Player	Chinese Name	Pos.	From	Yrs	Seasons	Ref.
Anthony Bennett	班尼特	F	University of Nevada, Las Vegas	2	2021–2022; 2023–2024	
Keith Benson	班森	C	Oakland University	1	2021–2022	
Kavell Bigby-Williams	比克	F/C	Louisiana State University	1	2023–2024	
Andrija Bojić	鉑伊	F/C	Serbia	1	2022–2023	
Taylor Braun	布朗	F	North Dakota State University	1	2021–2022	
Isaiah Briscoe^{x}	艾賽亞	G	University of Kentucky	1	2024–present	

=== C ===
Player	Chinese Name	Pos.	From	Yrs	Seasons	Ref.
Chang Po-Wei	張伯維	F	National Taiwan University of Arts	3	2021–2024	
Chen Fan Po-Yen^{x}	陳范柏彥	F	Chien Hsin University of Science and Technology	1	2024–present	
Chen Kuan-Chuan	陳冠全	C	National Taiwan Sport University	1	2023–2024	
Chen Yu-Wei	陳又瑋	G	National Taiwan Normal University	3	2021–2024	
Cheng Te-Wei	鄭德維	F	Shih Hsin University	2	2021–2023	
Chiu Po Chang	邱柏璋	F	National Taiwan University of Arts	2	2022–2024	
Chou Yi-Hsiang	周儀翔	G	Salt Lake Community College	2	2021–2023	
Chu Yuk-Kiun^{x}	朱育君	G	National Kaohsiung Normal University	1	2024–present	
Chuang Chao-Sheng^{x}	莊朝勝	G	National Chengchi University	1	2024–present	
Cameron Clark	卡麥龍	F	University of Oklahoma	1	2023–2024	

=== D ===
Player	Chinese Name	Pos.	From	Yrs	Seasons	Ref.
Oli Daniel^{x}	丹尼爾	C	Shih Hsin University	2	2023–present	
Austin Derrick	戴瑞騰	C	Chien Hsin University of Science and Technology	1	2021–2022	

=== H ===
Player	Chinese Name	Pos.	From	Yrs	Seasons
Manny Harris	哈里斯	G	University of Michigan	2	2021–2023
Aaron Harrison	鑀倫	G/F	University of Kentucky	1	2022–2023

=== J ===
Player	Chinese Name	Pos.	From	Yrs	Seasons
Terrence Jones	鈦強	F	University of Kentucky	1	2022–2023

=== K ===
Player	Chinese Name	Pos.	From	Yrs	Seasons	Ref.
Kao Wei-Lun^{x}	高偉綸	G	Vanung University	1	2024–present	
Viacheslav Kravtsov	克拉索夫	C	Ukraine	1	2022–2023	

=== L ===
Player	Chinese Name	Pos.	From	Yrs	Seasons	Ref.
Lan Shao-Fu	藍少甫	C	National Taiwan Sport University	2	2021–2023	
Wendell Lewis	溫德	F	Alabama State University	1	2022–2023	
Li Ruei-Ci	李睿麒	F	Taiwan Shoufu University	1	2023–2024	
Li Wei-Ting^{x}	李威廷	G	Shih Hsin University	1	2024–present	
Lin Chih-Wei	林郅為	C	Chinese Culture University	2	2022–2024	
Lin Hsin-Hsiang^{x}	林心翔	G	National Taiwan Normal University	1	2024–present	
Jeremy Lin	林書豪	G	Harvard University	1	2022–2023	
Lin Jyun-Hao	林均濠	F	National Taiwan University of Arts	2	2021–2023	
Lin Po-Hao	林柏豪	F	University of Kang Ning	1	2022–2023	
Liu Cheng-Yen^{x}	劉承彥	G	I-Shou University	2	2023–present	
Liu Yen-Ting^{x}	劉彥廷	F	Overseas Chinese University	1	2024–present	
Lu Che-Yi	盧哲毅	G	I-Shou University	3	2021–2024	
Lu Cheng-Ju	呂政儒	F	Taipei Physical Education College	3	2021–2024	

=== N ===
Player	Chinese Name	Pos.	From	Yrs	Seasons	Ref.
Gokul Natesan	悟空	G/F	Colorado School of Mines	2	2022–2024	

=== O ===
Player	Chinese Name	Pos.	From	Yrs	Seasons	Ref.
Femi Olujobi	鐵米	F	DePaul University	2	2022–2024	

=== P ===
Player	Chinese Name	Pos.	From	Yrs	Seasons	Ref.
Peng-Chun-Yen	彭俊諺	G	MingDao University	2	2021–2023	

=== Q ===
Player	Chinese Name	Pos.	From	Yrs	Seasons	Ref.
Marcus Quirk^{x}	馬克斯	F	National Formosa University	1	2024–present	

=== R ===
Player	Chinese Name	Pos.	From	Yrs	Seasons	Ref.
Rayvonte Rice	銳米	G	University of Illinois Urbana-Champaign	1	2023–2024	

=== S ===
Player	Chinese Name	Pos.	From	Yrs	Seasons	Ref.
Shih Chin-Yao	施晉堯	F	Chinese Culture University	1	2023–2024	
Sun Szu-Yao	孫思堯	C	New York Institute of Technology	1	2022–2023	

=== T ===
Player	Chinese Name	Pos.	From	Yrs	Seasons	Ref.
Hasheem Thabeet	塔壁	C	University of Connecticut	1	2023–2024	
Anthony Tucker	塔克	G	University of Minnesota	1	2021–2022	

=== W ===
Player	Chinese Name	Pos.	From	Yrs	Seasons	Ref.
Wang Kai-Yu^{x}	王凱裕	F	National Chengchi University	1	2024–present	
Wang Lu-Hsiang	王律翔	G	Chung Chou University of Science and Technology	3	2021–2024	
Wang Po-Chih	王柏智	C	National Taiwan Sport University	2	2021–2023	
Jay West	張傑瑋	G	Vanung University	1	2022–2023	

=== Y ===
Player	Chinese Name	Pos.	From	Yrs	Seasons	Ref.
Glen Yang	楊和	G	Mount Royal University	1	2023–2024	
Matthew Yang	楊浩之	G	Taichung Dreamers Academy	2	2021–2023	
