= List of 2023–24 PLG season transactions =

This is a list of transactions that took place during the 2023 PLG off-season and the 2023–24 PLG season.

== Retirement ==
Date	Name	Team(s) played (years)	Age	Notes	Ref.
November 4	Peng Chun-Yen	Taoyuan Pilots (2020–2021); Kaohsiung 17LIVE Steelers (2021–2023)	33	Also played overseas	

== Front office movements ==
=== Head coaching changes ===
Off-season

Departure date	Team	Outgoing head coach	Reason for departure	Hire date	Incoming head coach	Last coaching position	Ref.
July 4	Kaohsiung 17LIVE Steelers	Cheng Chih-Lung	—N/a	July 4	Chiu Ta-Tsung	Yulon Luxgen Dinos executive coach (2020–2023)	
July 19	Formosa Taishin Dreamers	Lai Po-Lin	—N/a	July 19	Jamie Pearlman	Adelaide 36ers lead assistant coach (2020–2023)	

In-season

Departure date	Team	Outgoing head coach	Reason for departure	Hire date	Incoming head coach	Last coaching position	Ref.
February 14	Hsinchu Toplus Lioneers	Lin Kuan-Lun	mutual agreement	February 14	Milan Mitrovic	Hsinchu Toplus Lioneers assistant coach (2023–2024)	

=== General manager changes ===
Off-season

Departure date	Team	Outgoing general manager	Reason for departure	Hire date	Incoming general manager	Last managerial position	Ref.
—N/a	Hsinchu JKO Lioneers	—N/a	—N/a	August 25	Chang Shu-Jen	New Taipei CTBC DEA general manager (2021–2022)	
March 1	Taoyuan Pauian Pilots	Chen Hsin-An	role adjustment	March 1	Li Chung-Shu	Taoyuan Pauian Pilots president (2020–2024)	

== Player movements ==
=== Trades ===
June
June 19, 2023	To Kaohsiung 17LIVE Steelers: Chen Kuan-Chuan; Shih Chin-Yao; 2023 Pilots first-round pick	To Taoyuan Pauian Pilots: Chou Yi-Hsiang

=== Free agents ===
Player	Date signed	New team	Former team	Ref
Kenny Manigault	June 18	New Taipei Kings		
Hsiao Shun-Yi	July 3	Hsinchu JKO Lioneers		
Wang Po-Chih	July 4	New Taipei Kings	Kaohsiung 17LIVE Steelers	
Wang Tzu-Kang	July 6	Hsinchu JKO Lioneers	Taiwan Beer (Super Basketball League)	
Sedrick Barefield	July 8	Taipei Fubon Braves	SLAC (Ligue 1)	
Hung Chih-Shan	July 21	New Taipei Kings		
Randall Walko	July 24	Formosa Taishin Dreamers		
Liu Guang-Shang	August 1	Hsinchu JKO Lioneers	FJU (Undrafted in 2023)	
Femi Olujobi	August 1	Kaohsiung 17LIVE Steelers	Indios de Mayagüez (Baloncesto Superior Nacional)	
Wu Yung-Sheng	August 1	Taipei Fubon Braves	Formosa Taishin Dreamers	
Chou Po-Hsun	August 3	Hsinchu JKO Lioneers	TaiwanBeer HeroBears (T1 League)	
Douglas Creighton	August 4	Formosa Taishin Dreamers		
Lin Chun-Chi	August 4	Formosa Taishin Dreamers		
Lin Li-Jen	August 4	New Taipei Kings		
Wu Sung-Wei	August 4	Formosa Taishin Dreamers		
Yang Shen-Yen	August 4	Formosa Taishin Dreamers		
Brandon Gilbeck	August 15	Formosa Taishin Dreamers		
Lin Ping-Sheng	August 15	Hsinchu JKO Lioneers	New Taipei CTBC DEA (T1 League)	
Taylor Braun	August 17	Hsinchu JKO Lioneers	Tainan TSG GhostHawks (T1 League)	
Mike Singletary	August 22	Taipei Fubon Braves		
Ihor Zaytsev	August 23	Taipei Fubon Braves		
Chris Johnson	August 24	Taipei Fubon Braves		
Giorgi Bezhanishvili	August 30	Formosa Dreamers	Vancouver Bandits (Canadian Elite Basketball League)	
Lu Che-Yi	August 31	Kaohsiung 17LIVE Steelers		
Stephen Zimmerman	August 31	Taipei Fubon Braves	Rizing Zephyr Fukuoka (B.League)	
Julian Boyd	September 1	Formosa Dreamers	Changhua BLL (Super Basketball League)	
Gokul Natesan	September 1	Kaohsiung 17LIVE Steelers		
Jason Washburn	September 5	Taoyuan Pauian Pilots		
Billy Preston	September 8	New Taipei Kings	Cape Town Tigers (Basketball National League)	
Tony Mitchell	September 11	New Taipei Kings	Cocodrilos de Caracas (Superliga Profesional de Baloncesto)	
Kavell Bigby-Williams	September 12	Kaohsiung 17LIVE Steelers	Héroes de Falcón (Superliga Profesional de Baloncesto)	
Kennedy Meeks	September 13	Taoyuan Pauian Pilots	Marineros de Puerto Plata (Liga Nacional de Baloncesto)	
Jeremy Lin	September 14	New Taipei Kings	Kaohsiung 17LIVE Steelers	
Shih Yen-Tsung	September 14	Hsinchu Lioneers	Taoyuan Pauian Pilots (waived on July 21)	
Anthony Lawrence	September 18	Taoyuan Pauian Pilots	SeaHorses Mikawa (B.League)	
Jamarcus Mearidy	September 18	Hsinchu Lioneers	Kaohsiung 17LIVE Steelers (waived on July 8)	
Li Ruei-Ci	September 19	Kaohsiung 17LIVE Steelers	New Taipei Kings	
Daniel Ochefu	September 20	Hsinchu Lioneers	Al Riyadi Club Beirut (Lebanese Basketball League)	
Hayden Blankley	September 22	New Taipei Kings	Bankstown Bruins (NBL1 East)	
Anthony Bennett	October 2	Kaohsiung 17LIVE Steelers	Goyang Sono Skygunners (Korean Basketball League)	
Earl Clark	October 5	Hsinchu Lioneers	Gigantes de Carolina (Baloncesto Superior Nacional)	
Anthony Tucker	October 20	Taoyuan Pauian Pilots	Windy City Bulls (NBA G League)	
Glen Yang	October 31	Kaohsiung 17LIVE Steelers	Winnipeg Sea Bears (Canadian Elite Basketball League)	
Christian Anigwe	November 2	New Taipei Kings	UC Davis	
Lu Kuan-Hsuan	November 4	Hsinchu Lioneers	Taichung Suns	
Ifeanyi Eboka	November 7	Taipei Fubon Braves	Hsinchu JKO Lioneers (waived on July 7)	
Chai Chen-Hao	November 10	New Taipei Kings	Taiwan Beer (Super Basketball League)	
Ivan Marinković	November 14	Hsinchu Lioneers	Antwerp Giants (BNXT League)	
Lee Hsueh-Lin	November 15	Taoyuan Pauian Pilots	New Taipei CTBC DEA (T1 League)	
Michael Efevberha	November 16	Hsinchu Lioneers	Taoyuan Leopards (T1 League)	
Michael Holyfield	December 6	Hsinchu Lioneers	Hapoel Hevel Modi'in (Liga Leumit)	
Hasheem Thabeet	December 13	Kaohsiung 17LIVE Steelers	Pazi (National Basketball League)	
Taylor Braun	December 15	Taipei Fubon Braves	Hsinchu Lioneers (waived on November 10)	
Alec Brown	December 20	Taoyuan Pauian Pilots	Indios de Mayagüez (Baloncesto Superior Nacional)	
Devyn Marble	December 26	Formosa Dreamers	Hapoel Galil Elyon (Israeli Basketball Premier League)	
Deyonta Davis	December 28	Hsinchu Toplus Lioneers	Goyang Sono Skygunners (Korean Basketball League)	
Rayvonte Rice	January 4	Kaohsiung 17LIVE Steelers	Taichung Suns	
Justin Patton	January 12	Taipei Fubon Braves	Shanxi Loongs (Chinese Basketball Association)	
Chen Yu-Han	February 2	Taoyuan Pauian Pilots	Taiwan Beer (Super Basketball League)	
Treveon Graham	February 7	Taoyuan Pauian Pilots	Motor City Cruise (NBA G League)	
Wayne Selden Jr.	February 16	Taipei Fubon Braves	Hong Kong Bulls (National Basketball League)	
Austin Daye	February 26	New Taipei Kings	Victoria Libertas Pallacanestro (Lega Basket Serie A)	
Matur Maker	February 27	Taipei Fubon Braves	Nelson Giants (National Basketball League)	
Cameron Clark	March 13	Kaohsiung 17LIVE Steelers	Manama Club (Bahraini Premier League)	
Prince Ibeh	March 15	Taipei Fubon Braves	Peñarol (Liga Uruguaya de Básquetbol)	
Tyler Bey	March 22	Taipei Fubon Braves	Magnolia Hotshots (Philippine Basketball Association)	
Wendell Lewis	April 3	New Taipei Kings	Rajawali Medan (Indonesian Basketball League)	
Wang Chen-Yuan	April 24	Formosa Dreamers	Changhua BLL (Super Basketball League)	

=== Going to other Taiwanese leagues ===
Player	Date signed	New team	New league	P. League+ team	Ref
Chang Keng-Yu	July 14	Taipei Taishin	T1 League	Taipei Fubon Braves	
Lin Jyun-Hao	July 31	Bank of Taiwan	Super Basketball League	Kaohsiung 17LIVE Steelers	
Huang Hung-Han	August 1	New Taipei CTBC DEA	T1 League	Taoyuan Pauian Pilots	
Cheng Te-Wei	August 3	Yulon Luxgen Dinos	Super Basketball League	Kaohsiung 17LIVE Steelers	
Lin Shih-Hsuan	August 3	Yulon Luxgen Dinos	Super Basketball League	New Taipei Kings	
Lan Shao-Fu	August 8	Taichung Suns	T1 League	Kaohsiung 17LIVE Steelers	
Kao Cheng-En	August 11	Tainan TSG GhostHawks	T1 League	New Taipei Kings	
Matthew Yang	August 11	Changhua BLL	Super Basketball League	Kaohsiung 17LIVE Steelers (waived on February 9, 2023)	
Kuo Shao-Chieh	August 21	Tainan TSG GhostHawks	T1 League	Hsinchu JKO Lioneers	
Sun Szu-Yao	August 24	Taipei Taishin Mars	T1 League	Kaohsiung 17LIVE Steelers (waived on July 31)	
Omar Niang	September 6	Bank of Taiwan	Super Basketball League	New Taipei Kings	
Lin Po-Hao	September 12	Taiwan Beer	Super Basketball League	Kaohsiung 17LIVE Steelers (waived on July 31)	
Lu Zong-Lin	October 2	Taiwan Beer	Super Basketball League	Taipei Fubon Braves (waived on October 2)	
Wang Chen-Yuan	January 10	Changhua BLL	Super Basketball League	Formosa Dreamers (waived on January 10)	
Ifeanyi Eboka	March 4	Yulon Luxgen Dinos	Super Basketball League	Taipei Fubon Braves (waived on January 31)	

=== Going overseas ===
Player	Date signed	New team	New country	Former P. League+ team	Ref
Jeremy Tyler	May 22	Indios de Mayagüez	Puerto Rico	Hsinchu JKO Lioneers	
Femi Olujobi	June 20	Indios de Mayagüez	Puerto Rico	Kaohsiung 17LIVE Steelers	
Anthony Bennett	July 29	Goyang Sono Skygunners	South Korea	Hsinchu JKO Lioneers	
Sani Sakakini	August 18	Al Riyadi Club Beirut	Lebanon	Taoyuan Pauian Pilots	
Wendell Lewis	August 29	Al-Salam	Saudi Arabia	Kaohsiung 17LIVE Steelers	
Ricci Rivero	September 17	Phoenix Super LPG Fuel Masters	Philippines	Taoyuan Pauian Pilots (waived on November 4, 2022)	
Jeff Ayres	October 5	Freseros de Irapuato	Mexico	Taoyuan Pauian Pilots	
İlkan Karaman	October 27	Çayırova Belediyesi	Turkey	Formosa Taishin Dreamers	
Hayden Blankley	January 3	Bankstown Bruins	Australia	New Taipei Kings (waived on April 3)	
Giorgi Bezhanishvili	January 11	Iowa Wolves	United States	Formosa Dreamers (waived on January 2)	
Ivan Marinković	March 1	BC Jonava	Lithuania	Hsinchu Lioneers (waived on December 12)	
Kavell Bigby-Williams	March 8	Astros de Jalisco	Mexico	Kaohsiung 17LIVE Steelers (waived on December 22)	
Billy Preston	March 8	Cape Town Tigers	South Africa	New Taipei Kings (waived on October)	
Anthony Lawrence	March 14	Yokohama Excellence	Japan	Taoyuan Pauian Pilots (waived on February 6)	
Wayne Selden Jr.	March 25	Chorale Roanne	France	Taipei Fubon Braves (waived on March 22)	
Daniel Ochefu	March 26	Bishrelt Metal	Mongolia	Hsinchu Lioneers (waived on December 1)	
Gokul Natesan	April 8	Spartans Distrito Capital	Venezuela	Kaohsiung 17LIVE Steelers (waived on December 14)	
Glen Yang	April 25	Vancouver Bandits	Canada	Kaohsiung 17LIVE Steelers (waived on March 27)	
Matur Maker	April 27	Rockhampton Rockets	Australia	Taipei Fubon Braves (waived on March 15)	
Stephen Zimmerman	May 7	NS Matrix Deers	Malaysia	Taipei Fubon Braves (waived on January 24)	
Byron Mullens	May 9	Winnipeg Sea Bears	Canada	New Taipei Kings (waived on March 30)	

=== Waived ===
Player	Date	Former team	Ref
Ifeanyi Eboka	July 7	Hsinchu JKO Lioneers	
Jay West	July 8	Kaohsiung 17LIVE Steelers	
Shih Yen-Tsung	July 21	Taoyuan Pauian Pilots	
Lin Po-Hao	July 31	Kaohsiung 17LIVE Steelers	
Sun Szu-Yao	July 31	Kaohsiung 17LIVE Steelers	
Lu Zong-Lin	October 2	Taipei Fubon Braves	
Billy Preston	October 24	New Taipei Kings	
Taylor Braun	November 10	Hsinchu Lioneers	
Daniel Ochefu	December 1	Hsinchu Lioneers	
Ivan Marinković	December 12	Hsinchu Lioneers	
Gokul Natesan	December 14	Kaohsiung 17LIVE Steelers	
Anthony Bennett	December 22	Kaohsiung 17LIVE Steelers	
Kavell Bigby-Williams	December 22	Kaohsiung 17LIVE Steelers	
Anthony Tucker	December 31	Taoyuan Pauian Pilots	
Giorgi Bezhanishvili	January 2	Formosa Dreamers	
Sedrick Barefield	January 4	Taipei Fubon Braves	
Taylor Braun	January 4	Taipei Fubon Braves	
Wang Chen-Yuan	January 10	Formosa Dreamers	
Stephen Zimmerman	January 24	Taipei Fubon Braves	
Will Artino	January 30	Hsinchu Toplus Lioneers	
Ifeanyi Eboka	January 31	Taipei Fubon Braves	
Anthony Lawrence	February 6	Taoyuan Pauian Pilots	
Matur Maker	March 15	Taipei Fubon Braves	
Justin Patton	March 15	Taipei Fubon Braves	
Wayne Selden Jr.	March 22	Taipei Fubon Braves	
Glen Yang	March 27	Kaohsiung 17LIVE Steelers	
Byron Mullens	March 30	New Taipei Kings	
Mike Singletary	April 2	Taipei Fubon Braves	
Christian Anigwe	April 3	New Taipei Kings	
Hayden Blankley	April 3	New Taipei Kings	

== Draft ==
Pick	Player	Date signed	Team	Ref
1	Joof Alasan	—	Hsinchu JKO Lioneers	
2	Qiao Chu-Yu	August 14	Taoyuan Pauian Pilots	
3	Ting Kuang-Hao	July 26	Formosa Taishin Dreamers	
4	Oli Daniel	July 25	Kaohsiung 17LIVE Steelers	
5	Su Pei-Kai	July 28	New Taipei Kings	
6	Tsai Chen-Yueh	August 18	Taipei Fubon Braves	
7	Wang Yi-Fan	—	Hsinchu JKO Lioneers	
8	Liu Cheng-Yen	July 25	Kaohsiung 17LIVE Steelers	
