= 2023–24 PLG season =

- League: P. League+
- Sport: Basketball
- Duration: November 11, 2023 – May 19, 2024; May 23, 2024 – June 3, 2024 (playoffs); June 9, 2024 – June 20, 2024 (finals)
- Games: 40
- Teams: 6
- TV partner(s): FTV One, MOMOTV

Draft
- Top draft pick: Joof Alasan
- Picked by: Hsinchu JKO Lioneers

Regular season
- Top seed: Taoyuan Pauian Pilots
- Season MVP: Lu Chun-Hsiang (Pilots)
- Top scorer: Michael Efevberha (Lioneers)

Playoffs

Finals
- Champions: New Taipei Kings
- Runners-up: Taoyuan Pauian Pilots
- Finals MVP: Lee Kai-Yan

P. League+ seasons
- ← 2022–23 2024–25 →

The 2023–24 PLG season was the 4th season of the P. League+.

== Transactions ==
=== Retirement ===
- On November 4, 2023, Peng Chun-Yen announced his retirement from professional basketball.

=== Coaching changes ===
Coaching changes
Team	2022–23 season	2023–24 season
Off-season
Kaohsiung 17LIVE Steelers	Cheng Chih-Lung	Chiu Ta-Tsung
Formosa Taishin Dreamers	Lai Po-Lin	Jamie Pearlman
In-season
Hsinchu Toplus Lioneers	Lin Kuan-Lun	Milan Mitrovic

==== Off-season ====
- On July 4, 2023, the Kaohsiung 17LIVE Steelers hired Chiu Ta-Tsung as their new head coach.
- On July 19, 2023, the Formosa Taishin Dreamers hired Jamie Pearlman as their new head coach.

==== In-season ====
- On February 14, 2024, the Hsinchu Toplus Lioneers and Lin Kuan-Lun reached a mutual agreement to end the contract, and named Milan Mitrovic as the new head coach.

== Imports, foreign students, and heritage players ==
Teams are allowed to register five imports before the final registration date. Only four imports are allowed after the closure of registration.

Club	Imports	Foreign students	Heritage players
Formosa Dreamers	(Georgia (country)) ~~Giorgi Bezhanishvili~~ (United States) Julian Boyd (United States) Brandon Gilbeck (United States) Devyn Marble (United States) Chris McCullough		(United States) Kenneth Chien (United States) Randall Walko
Hsinchu Toplus Lioneers	(United States) ~~Will Artino~~ (United States) ~~Taylor Braun~~ (Serbia) ~~Ivan Marinković~~ (United States) ~~Daniel Ochefu~~ (United States) Earl Clark (United States) Deyonta Davis (United States) Michael Efevberha (United States) Michael Holyfield	(United States) Jamarcus Mearidy	
Kaohsiung 17LIVE Steelers	(Canada) ~~Anthony Bennett~~ (United Kingdom) ~~Kavell Bigby-Williams~~ (United States) ~~Gokul Natesan~~ (Canada) ~~Glen Yang~~ (United States) Cameron Clark (United States) Femi Olujobi (United States) Rayvonte Rice (Tanzania) Hasheem Thabeet	(Nigeria) Oli Daniel	
New Taipei Kings	(United States) ~~Christian Anigwe~~ (Australia) ~~Hayden Blankley~~ (United States) ~~Byron Mullens~~ (United States) ~~Billy Preston~~ (United States) Austin Daye (United States) Wendell Lewis (United States) Kenny Manigault (United States) Tony Mitchell		(United States) Jeremy Lin (United States) Joseph Lin
Taipei Fubon Braves	(United States) ~~Sedrick Barefield~~ (United States) ~~Taylor Braun~~ (Australia) ~~Matur Maker~~ (United States) ~~Justin Patton~~ (United States) ~~Wayne Selden Jr.~~ (United States) ~~Mike Singletary~~ (United States) ~~Stephen Zimmerman~~ (United States) Tyler Bey (United Kingdom) Prince Ibeh (United States) Chris Johnson (Ukraine) Ihor Zaytsev	(Nigeria) ~~Ifeanyi Eboka~~ (Saint Vincent and the Grenadines) Brendon Smart	(France) Steven Guinchard
Taoyuan Pauian Pilots	(United States) ~~Anthony Lawrence~~ (United States) ~~Anthony Tucker~~ (United States) Alec Brown (United States) Treveon Graham (United States) Kennedy Meeks (United States) Jason Washburn	(Senegal) Amdy Dieng	

Note 1: "Heritage player" refers to a player who is of Taiwanese descent but does not meet the FIBA eligibility rules to be local.

Note 2: Team can either register two heritage players, or one foreign student and one heritage player.

== Interleague play ==
The interleague play, an interleague tournament which was played by teams from P. League+, T1 League, and Super Basketball League, began on September 16, 2023, and ended on September 22. The Taoyuan Pauian Pilots and the Taichung Dreamers Academy played in the tournament as a united team.

== Preseason ==
The preseason started on October 7, 2023 and ended on October 9.

== Regular season ==
The regular season began on 11 November 2023, and ended on 19 May 2024.

Pos	Team	W	L	PCT	GB	Qualification
1	Taoyuan Pauian Pilots	26	14	.650	—	Playoffs
2	Formosa Dreamers	24	16	.600	2	Playoffs
3	New Taipei Kings	22	18	.550	4	Playoffs
4	Hsinchu Toplus Lioneers	21	19	.525	5	Playoffs
5	Taipei Fubon Braves	18	22	.450	8	
6	Kaohsiung 17LIVE Steelers	9	31	.225	17	

Updated to match(es) played on 19 May 2024. Source: P.League+

=== Results summary ===
Home \ Away	FD	HL	KLS	NTK	TFB	TPP
Dreamers		95–73	93–101	93–76	89–86	87–84
Dreamers		89–94	96–79	91–70	90–76	93–88
Dreamers		101–85	117–104	94–116	84–94	97–80
Dreamers		93–66	102–99	97–93	85–81	88–90
Lioneers	73–91		94–83	80–95	84–99	93–80
Lioneers	98–96		97–78	88–80	77–72	72–83
Lioneers	98–96		115–108	72–94	95–89	96–106
Lioneers	99–87		116–112	88–98	129–109	80–100
Steelers	90–91	98–99		81–92	80–93	114–119
Steelers	90–109	104–89		83–94	99–91	106–110
Steelers	83–102	110–103		102–109	69–98	94–104
Steelers	103–100	110–116		82–121	107–98	89–90
Kings	104–120	111–87	109–93		111–106	123–113
Kings	114–82	98–105	110–97		96–104	98–92
Kings	101–103	79–97	111–93		77–102	97–112
Kings	105–108	101–105	113–101		74–102	94–76
Braves	103–98	102–103	115–94	89–96		106–83
Braves	111–104	109–103	111–104	104–129		92–113
Braves	73–96	102–97	89–90	122–96		97–101
Braves	79–74	101–120	106–95	95–101		92–89
Pilots	69–85	81–98	81–71	86–107	100–71	
Pilots	93–82	94–82	83–87	100–90	96–87	
Pilots	89–85	96–71	82–91	94–87	94–92	
Pilots	96–92	98–81	83–79	92–90	98–76	

Source: / P.League+
Legend: Blue = home team win; Yellow = draw; Red = away team win.
For upcoming matches, an "a" indicates there is an article about the rivalry between the two participants.
Matches with lighter background shading were decided after overtime.

=== Rescheduled games ===
- The February 20 game between the Formosa Dreamers and the Kaohsiung 17LIVE Steelers was rescheduled due to the 2025 FIBA Asia Cup qualification.
- Two Taoyuan Pauian Pilots home games (one game against the Taipei Fubon Braves on February 24 and one game against the Formosa Dreamers on February 25) were rescheduled due to the 2025 FIBA Asia Cup qualification.
- Two Hsinchu Lioneers home games (one game against the Kaohsiung 17LIVE Steelers on February 24 and one game against the New Taipei Kings on February 25) were rescheduled due to the 2025 FIBA Asia Cup qualification.

== Playoffs ==
The playoffs were scheduled to begin on May 23 and end on June 24.

=== Bracket ===
Playoffs
1	**Pilots**	4
4	Lioneers	2
2	Dreamers	2
3	**Kings**	4

Finals
1	Pilots	1
3	**Kings**	4

Bold: Series winner
Italic: Team with home-court advantage

== Statistics ==
=== Individual statistic leaders ===
Category	Player	Team(s)	Statistic
Points per game	Michael Efevberha	Hsinchu Toplus Lioneers	23.03
Rebounds per game	Jason Washburn	Taoyuan Pauian Pilots	13.16
Assists per game	Joseph Lin	New Taipei Kings	6.74
Steals per game	Kenny Manigault	New Taipei Kings	2.76
Blocks per game	Brandon Gilbeck	Formosa Dreamers	2.50
2P%	Deyonta Davis	Hsinchu Toplus Lioneers	66%
3P%	Austin Daye	New Taipei Kings	50%
FT%	Jian Ting-Jhao	Taipei Fubon Braves	89%

=== Individual game highs ===
Category	Player	Team	Statistic
Points	Cameron Clark	Kaohsiung 17LIVE Steelers	48
Rebounds	Chris Johnson	Taipei Fubon Braves	24
Assists	Joseph Lin	New Taipei Kings	19
Steals	Lai Ting-En	Taipei Fubon Braves	7
Steals	Rayvonte Rice	Kaohsiung 17LIVE Steelers	7
Blocks	Brandon Gilbeck	Formosa Dreamers	8
Turnovers	Chris McCullough	Formosa Dreamers	10

=== Team statistic leaders ===
Category	Team	Statistic
Points per game	New Taipei Kings	99.00
Rebounds per game	Formosa Dreamers	56.10
Assists per game	New Taipei Kings	23.20
Steals per game	New Taipei Kings	9.78
Blocks per game	Hsinchu Toplus Lioneers	4.80
Turnovers per game	Taipei Fubon Braves	16.85
Fouls per game	New Taipei Kings	21.15
2P%	New Taipei Kings	49.21%
3P%	Taipei Fubon Braves	32.00%
FT%	Taoyuan Pauian Pilots	71.67%

== Awards ==
=== Yearly awards ===
2023–24 PLG awards
Award		Recipient(s)	ref
Most Valuable Player		Lu Chun-Hsiang (Taoyuan Pauian Pilots)	
Import of the Year		Jason Washburn (Taoyuan Pauian Pilots)	
6th Man of the Year		Tseng Po-Yu (Hsinchu Toplus Lioneers)	
Rookie of the Year		Oli Daniel (Kaohsiung 17LIVE Steelers)	
Defensive Player of the Year		Brandon Gilbeck (Formosa Dreamers)	
GM of the Year		Han Chun-Kai (Formosa Dreamers)	
Coach of the Year		Iurgi Caminos (Taoyuan Pauian Pilots)	
Most Improved Player		Tseng Po-Yu (Hsinchu Toplus Lioneers)	
Best Home Court		Hsinchu Toplus Lioneers	
Best Dressed of the Year		Joseph Lin (New Taipei Kings)	
Mr. Popular		Lin Chih-Chieh (Taipei Fubon Braves)	
PLG Cheerleader Squad of the Year		Fubon Angels (Taipei Fubon Braves)	
Highlight of the Year	Clutch Shot		
Highlight of the Year	Dunk		
Highlight of the Year	Assist		
Highlight of the Year	Circus Shot		
Highlight of the Year	Block		
Highlight of the Year	Handles		
PLG Cheerleader Ms. Popular		Chloe (Formosa Sexy)	
Mr. Clutch		Jason Washburn (Taoyuan Pauian Pilots)	
PLG Cheerleader Rookie of the Year		Lee Ho-Zeong (Fubon Angels)	
Comeback Player of the Year		Chris McCullough (Formosa Dreamers)	

- All-PLG First Team:
  - Kao Kuo-Hao, Hsinchu Toplus Lioneers
  - Lin Chun-Chi, Formosa Dreamers
  - Lu Chun-Hsiang, Taoyuan Pauian Pilots
  - Chou Kuei-Yu, Taipei Fubon Braves
  - Jason Washburn, Taoyuan Pauian Pilots
- All-PLG Second Team:
  - Chen Yu-Wei, Kaohsiung 17LIVE Steelers
  - Lin Chih-Chieh, Taipei Fubon Braves
  - Joseph Lin, New Taipei Kings
  - Brandon Gilbeck, Formosa Dreamers
  - Randall Walko, Formosa Dreamers

- All-Defensive Team:
  - Kao Kuo-Hao, Hsinchu Toplus Lioneers
  - Lu Chun-Hsiang, Taoyuan Pauian Pilots
  - Oli Daniel, Kaohsiung 17LIVE Steelers
  - Brandon Gilbeck, Formosa Dreamers
  - Randall Walko, Formosa Dreamers

==== Statistical awards ====
2023–24 PLG statistical awards
Award	Recipient(s)	ref
Points Leader	Michael Efevberha	
Rebounds Leader	Jason Washburn	
Assists Leader	Joseph Lin	
Blocks Leader	Brandon Gilbeck	
Steals Leader	Kenny Manigault	

==== Finals ====
2024 PLG finals awards
Award	Recipient(s)	ref
Champion	New Taipei Kings	
Finals MVP	Lee Kai-Yan	

=== Players of the Week ===
Week	Recipient	Ref
1	Joseph Lin (New Taipei Kings) (1/1)	
2	Lu Cheng-Ju (Kaohsiung 17LIVE Steelers) (1/1)	
3	Jeremy Lin (New Taipei Kings) (1/2)	
4	Lin Chun-Chi (Formosa Dreamers) (1/3)	
5	Michael Efevberha (Hsinchu Lioneers) (1/2)	
6	Kao Kuo-Hao (Hsinchu Toplus Lioneers) (1/2)	
7	Chris McCullough (Formosa Dreamers) (1/1)	
8	Kao Kuo-Hao (Hsinchu Toplus Lioneers) (2/2)	
9	Pai Yao-Cheng (Taoyuan Pauian Pilots) (1/2)	
10	Lu Chun-Hsiang (Taoyuan Pauian Pilots) (1/2)	
11	Jason Washburn (Taoyuan Pauian Pilots) (1/2)	
12	Lin Chih-Chieh (Taipei Fubon Braves) (1/1)	
13	Li Wei-Ting (New Taipei Kings) (1/1)	
15	Chou Yi-Hsiang (Taoyuan Pauian Pilots) (1/2)	
16	Alec Brown (Taoyuan Pauian Pilots) (1/1)	
17	Chou Yi-Hsiang (Taoyuan Pauian Pilots) (2/2)	
18	Lin Chun-Chi (Formosa Dreamers) (2/3)	
19	Jason Washburn (Taoyuan Pauian Pilots) (2/2)	
20	Lu Chun-Hsiang (Taoyuan Pauian Pilots) (2/2)	
21	Kennedy Meeks (Taoyuan Pauian Pilots) (1/1)	
22	Lin Li-Jen (New Taipei Kings) (1/1)	
23	Lin Chun-Chi (Formosa Dreamers) (3/3)	
24	Rayvonte Rice (Kaohsiung 17LIVE Steelers) (1/1)	
25	Michael Efevberha (Hsinchu Toplus Lioneers) (2/2)	
26	Jeremy Lin (New Taipei Kings) (2/2)	
27	Pai Yao-Cheng (Taoyuan Pauian Pilots) (2/2)	
28	Lee Chia-Jui (Hsinchu Toplus Lioneers) (1/1)	

=== Players of the Month ===
Month	Recipient	Ref
November	Jeremy Lin (New Taipei Kings) (1/1)	
December	Lin Chun-Chi (Formosa Dreamers) (1/2)	
January	Lin Chih-Chieh (Taipei Fubon Braves) (1/1)	
February	Lu Chun-Hsiang (Taoyuan Pauian Pilots) (1/2)	
March	Lu Chun-Hsiang (Taoyuan Pauian Pilots) (2/2)	
April	Lin Chun-Chi (Formosa Dreamers) (2/2)	
May	Jason Washburn (Taoyuan Pauian Pilots) (1/1)	

== Arenas ==
The Formosa Dreamers played their home games respectively at Changhua County Stadium (Changhua) and Intercontinental Basketball Stadium (Taichung). The home games in May were originally scheduled to be played at Changhua County Stadium but were relocated to Intercontinental Basketball Stadium due to event scheduling.

== Media ==
The games were aired on television via FTV One and MOMOTV, and were broadcast online on the YouTube official channel and 4GTV. PTS+ joined the online broadcasting for the 2024 PLG finals.

== Notable occurrences ==
- On June 30, 2023, Chen Chien-Chou self-suspended his role as the PLG CEO. On July 4, the PLG board of directors named Chou Chung-Wei, the PLG director of marketing strategies, as the interim CEO, but he was removed from the role six days later. On October 5, Li Chung-Shu, the president of the Taoyuan Pauian Pilots, succeeded him.
- Both the Formosa Dreamers (Taishin Bank) and Hsinchu Lioneers (JKOPay) dropped their sponsors from their names.
- On November 6, 2023, Richard Chang was appointed as the PLG's first commissioner after the league had announced its restructuring. On November 7, Chen Chien-Chou was appointed as his deputy. Cheng Wei-Po was named as the CEO.
- On December 20, 2023, the Hsinchu Toplus Lioneers was renamed after receiving a naming sponsorship via Toplus Global.
