= 2023–24 Kaohsiung 17LIVE Steelers season =

Taiwanese professional basketball season

Kaohsiung 17LIVE Steelers
2023–24 season
- President: Huang Che-Kuan
- General Manager: Kenny Kao
- Head Coach: Chiu Ta-Tsung
- Arena: Fengshan Arena
- P. League+: 9–31 (.225)
- Playoffs: Did not qualify.
- Scoring leader: Chen Yu-Wei (10.95)
- Rebounding leader: Oli Daniel (6.98)
- Assists leader: Chen Yu-Wei (6.21)
- Highest home attendance: 4,988 (December 3, 2023)
- Lowest home attendance: 1,453 (March 24, 2024)
- Average home attendance: 2,768
- Biggest win: Steelers 104–89 Lioneers (January 27, 2024)
- Biggest defeat: Steelers 82–121 Kings (May 18, 2024)
- All statistics correct as of May 20, 2024.

The 2023–24 Kaohsiung 17LIVE Steelers season is the franchise's 3rd season, its third season in the P. League+ (PLG), its 3rd in Kaohsiung City. The Steelers named Chiu Ta-Tsung as their head coach.

== Draft ==
Round	Pick	Player	Position	Status	School/club team
1	4	Oli Daniel	C	Foreign student	SHU
2	8	Liu Cheng-Yen	G	Local	ISU

On October 21, 2021, the Steelers' 2023 first-round draft pick was traded to Taoyuan Pilots in exchange for Peng Chun-Yen. On June 19, 2023, the Steelers acquired Chen Kuan-Chuan, Shih Chin-Yao, and 2023 first-round 4th draft pick from Taoyuan Pauian Pilots in exchange for Chou Yi-Hsiang.

== Standings ==
Pos	Team	W	L	PCT	GB	Qualification
1	Taoyuan Pauian Pilots	26	14	.650	—	Playoffs
2	Formosa Dreamers	24	16	.600	2	Playoffs
3	New Taipei Kings	22	18	.550	4	Playoffs
4	Hsinchu Toplus Lioneers	21	19	.525	5	Playoffs
5	Taipei Fubon Braves	18	22	.450	8	
6	Kaohsiung 17LIVE Steelers	9	31	.225	17	

Updated to match(es) played on 19 May 2024. Source: P.League+

== Roster ==
Note: Flags indicate national team eligibility at FIBA-sanctioned events. Players may hold other non-FIBA nationalities not displayed.

2023–24 Kaohsiung 17LIVE Steelers roster
Players
Coaches

Pos.	No.	Nat.	Name	Ht.	Wt.	DOB (YYYY-MM-DD)	From
F	0	(United States)	Femi Olujobi (I)	2.06 m (6 ft 9 in)	114 kg (251 lb)	30 – 5 March 1996	DePaul
F	1	(Taiwan)	Li Ruei-Ci	1.93 m (6 ft 4 in)	87 kg (192 lb)	33 – 7 January 1993	TSU
G	2	(Taiwan)	Liu Cheng-Yen	1.73 m (5 ft 8 in)	72 kg (159 lb)	25 – 8 July 2001	I-Shou
G	4	(Taiwan)	Chen Yu-Wei	1.83 m (6 ft 0 in)	85 kg (187 lb)	26 – 29 December 1999	NTNU
F	6	(Taiwan)	Chiu Po-Chang	1.88 m (6 ft 2 in)	91 kg (201 lb)	30 – 2 November 1995	NTUA
G	8	(Taiwan)	Wang Lu-Hsiang	1.85 m (6 ft 1 in)	82 kg (181 lb)	28 – 21 December 1997	CCUT
F	13	(Taiwan)	Lu Cheng-Ju (injured) (C)	1.94 m (6 ft 4 in)	93 kg (205 lb)	40 – 13 April 1986	TPEC
G	15	(Taiwan)	Lu Che-Yi	1.87 m (6 ft 2 in)	83 kg (183 lb)	33 – 15 July 1993	I-Shou
C	18	(Taiwan)	Lin Chih-Wei	2.00 m (6 ft 7 in)	95 kg (209 lb)	34 – 10 July 1992	Chinese Culture
F	21	(United States)	Cameron Clark (I)	2.01 m (6 ft 7 in)	95 kg (209 lb)	35 – 16 September 1991	Oklahoma
G	23	(United States)	Rayvonte Rice (I)	1.93 m (6 ft 4 in)	109 kg (240 lb)	34 – 14 July 1992	Illinois
F	28	(Taiwan)	Shih Chin-Yao	1.88 m (6 ft 2 in)	86 kg (190 lb)	35 – 28 October 1990	Chinese Culture
C	30	(Taiwan)	Chen Kuan-Chuan	1.97 m (6 ft 6 in)	115 kg (254 lb)	32 – 30 December 1993	NTSU
C	34	(Tanzania)	Hasheem Thabeet (I)	2.21 m (7 ft 3 in)	118 kg (260 lb)	39 – 16 February 1987	Connecticut
C	35	(Nigeria)	Oli Daniel (FS)	2.05 m (6 ft 9 in)	102 kg (225 lb)	26 – 7 August 2000	SHU
F	77	(Taiwan)	Chang Po-Wei	1.90 m (6 ft 3 in)	90 kg (198 lb)	36 – 22 July 1990	NTUA

Head coach

- (Taiwan) Chiu Ta-Tsung

Assistant coach(es)

- (Taiwan) Han Yi-Ping
- (Taiwan) Oscar Lin

Athletic trainer(s)

- (Taiwan) Bao Chun-Hsin
- (Taiwan) Huang Yu-Chun

Legend

- (C) Team captain
- (I) Import player
- (FS) Foreign student player
- (HP) Heritage player
- (FA) Free agent
- (DP) Unsigned draft pick
- (AI) EASL Asian import
- (S) Suspended
- Injured

- Roster
Updated: March 26, 2024

== Game log ==
=== Preseason ===
2023 preseason game log
Total: 2–0 (Home: 2–0; Road: 0–0)
Preseason : 2–0 (Home: 2–0; Road: 0–0)

Game	Date	Team	Score	High points	High rebounds	High assists	Location Attendance	Record
1	October 7	Braves	W 103–84	Femi Olujobi (37)	Femi Olujobi (12)	Chen Yu-Wei (8)	Keelung Municipal Stadium; 3,286	1–0
2	October 9	Kings	W 91–77	Anthony Bennett (26)	Femi Olujobi (16)	Chen Yu-Wei (7)	Keelung Municipal Stadium; 4,597	2–0

2023–24 schedule

=== Regular season ===
2023–24 game log
Total: 9–31 (home: 5–15; road: 4–16)
November : 1–2 (Home: 0–0; Road: 1–2)

Game	Date	Team	Score	High points	High rebounds	High assists	Location Attendance	Record
1	November 12	@Braves	L 94–115	Anthony Bennett (23)	Anthony Bennett (12)	Chen Yu-Wei (7)	Taipei Heping Basketball Gymnasium; 4,920	0–1
2	November 18	@Dreamers	W 101–93	Lu Cheng-Ju (30)	Anthony Bennett (12)	Chen Yu-Wei (8)	Changhua County Stadium; 3,134	1–1
3	November 26	@Kings	L 93–109	Femi Olujobi (29)	Oli Daniel (13)	Anthony Bennett (5)	Xinzhuang Gymnasium; 5,235	1–2

December : 0–10 (Home: 0–6; Road: 0–4)

Game	Date	Team	Score	High points	High rebounds	High assists	Location Attendance	Record
4	December 2	Pilots	L 114–119 (OT)	Femi Olujobi (28)	Femi Olujobi (17)	Chen Yu-Wei (9)	Fengshan Arena; 3,681	1–3
5	December 3	Kings	L 81–92	Glen Yang (18)	Kavell Bigby-Williams (10)	Glen Yang (6)	Fengshan Arena; 4,988	1–4
6	December 9	Braves	L 80–93	Femi Olujobi (22)	Oli Daniel (10)	Natesan, Yang (4)	Fengshan Arena; 2,795	1–5
7	December 10	Dreamers	L 90–91	Anthony Bennett (28)	Anthony Bennett (10)	Chen Yu-Wei (6)	Fengshan Arena; 2,686	1–6
8	December 16	@Braves	L 104–111	Anthony Bennett (29)	Anthony Bennett (11)	Chen Yu-Wei (12)	Taipei Heping Basketball Gymnasium; 5,215	1–7
9	December 19	@Pilots	L 71–81	Femi Olujobi (25)	Bigby-Williams, Olujobi (10)	Chen Yu-Wei (4)	Taoyuan Arena; 1,308	1–8
10	December 22	@Dreamers	L 79–96	Lu Cheng-Ju (20)	Hasheem Thabeet (10)	Chen Y., Olujobi (5)	Intercontinental Basketball Stadium; 2,811	1–9
11	December 24	@Lioneers	L 83–94	Femi Olujobi (22)	Oli Daniel (17)	Lu Cheng-Ju (4)	Hsinchu County Stadium; 5,643	1–10
12	December 30	Pilots	L 106–110(OT)	Femi Olujobi (35)	Hasheem Thabeet (11)	Chen Y., Olujobi (7)	Fengshan Arena; 2,984	1–11
13	December 31	Dreamers	L 90–109	Femi Olujobi (26)	Femi Olujobi (14)	Chen Yu-Wei (5)	Fengshan Arena; 3,166	1–12

January : 3–2 (Home: 1–1; Road: 2–1)

Game	Date	Team	Score	High points	High rebounds	High assists	Location Attendance	Record
14	January 6	@Pilots	W 87–83	Rayvonte Rice (17)	Hasheem Thabeet (18)	Rayvonte Rice (4)	Taoyuan Arena; 1,389	2–12
15	January 14	@Pilots	W 91–82	Femi Olujobi (21)	Femi Olujobi (16)	Chen Y., Shih (5)	Taoyuan Arena; 1,315	3–12
16	January 21	@Kings	L 97–110	Femi Olujobi (28)	Femi Olujobi (14)	Chen Yu-Wei (7)	Xinzhuang Gymnasium; 4,584	3–13
17	January 27	Lioneers	W 104–89	Femi Olujobi (40)	Femi Olujobi (14)	Chen Yu-Wei (8)	Fengshan Arena; 2,972	4–13
18	January 28	Kings	L 83–94	Femi Olujobi (20)	Hasheem Thabeet (15)	Chen Yu-Wei (8)	Fengshan Arena; 4,253	4–14

February : 2–1 (Home: 1–0; Road: 1–1)

Game	Date	Team	Score	High points	High rebounds	High assists	Location Attendance	Record
19	February 3	@Braves	W 90–89	Femi Olujobi (28)	Hasheem Thabeet (8)	Chen Yu-Wei (8)	Taipei Heping Basketball Gymnasium; 5,236	5–14
20	February 6	@Kings	L 93–111	Oli Daniel (22)	Daniel, Wang (7)	Chen Yu-Wei (6)	Xinzhuang Gymnasium; 4,211	5–15
PPD	February 20	@Dreamers	Postponed					
PPD	February 24	@Lioneers	Postponed					
21	February 27	Braves	W 99–91	Rayvonte Rice (32)	Oli Daniel (12)	Rayvonte Rice (7)	Fengshan Arena; 2,835	6–15

March : 1–7 (Home: 1–4; Road: 0–3)

Game	Date	Team	Score	High points	High rebounds	High assists	Location Attendance	Record
22	March 2	Lioneers	L 98–99	Rayvonte Rice (27)	Femi Olujobi (12)	Shih Chin-Yao (6)	Fengshan Arena; 2,525	6–16
23	March 3	Dreamers	L 83–102	Femi Olujobi (27)	Femi Olujobi (10)	Chen Y., Rice (4)	Fengshan Arena; 2,328	6–17
24	March 16	@Lioneers	L 78–97	Rayvonte Rice (24)	Femi Olujobi (14)	Femi Olujobi (7)	Hsinchu County Stadium; 4,266	6–18
25	March 19	Pilots	L 94–104	Femi Olujobi (26)	Femi Olujobi (8)	Chen Yu-Wei (7)	Fengshan Arena; 1,568	6–19
26	March 23	Kings	L 102–109	Rayvonte Rice (28)	Hasheem Thabeet (10)	Chen Yu-Wei (8)	Fengshan Arena; 2,432	6–20
27	March 24	Lioneers	W 110–103	Rayvonte Rice (38)	Cameron Clark (14)	Chen Yu-Wei (9)	Fengshan Arena; 1,453	7–20
28	March 29	@Dreamers	L 104–117	Rayvonte Rice (25)	Clark, Daniel, Rice (7)	Shih Chin-Yao (8)	Intercontinental Basketball Stadium; 2,276	7–21
29	March 31	@Pilots	L 79–83	Cameron Clark (26)	Hasheem Thabeet (22)	Chen Yu-Wei (7)	Taoyuan Arena; 1,783	7–22

April : 2–4 (Home: 2–2; Road: 0–2)

Game	Date	Team	Score	High points	High rebounds	High assists	Location Attendance	Record
30	April 6	@Lioneers	L 108–115	Cameron Clark (48)	Cameron Clark (17)	Chen Yu-Wei (6)	Hsinchu County Stadium; 4,271	7–23
31	April 13	Lioneers	L 110–116	Cameron Clark (29)	Cameron Clark (13)	Chen Y., Clark (4)	Fengshan Arena; 2,014	7–24
32	April 14	Braves	L 69–98	Oli Daniel (13)	Oli Daniel (10)	Chen Yu-Wei (6)	Fengshan Arena; 2,034	7–25
33	April 20	Braves	W 107–98	Rayvonte Rice (46)	Chen Yu-Wei (12)	Shih Chin-Yao (6)	Fengshan Arena; 1,788	8–25
34	April 21	Dreamers	W 103–100	Rayvonte Rice (33)	Chen Yu-Wei (14)	Chen Y., Rice (8)	Fengshan Arena; 1,653	9–25
35	April 28	@Dreamers	L 99–102 (OT)	Rayvonte Rice (35)	Rayvonte Rice (14)	Chen Yu-Wei (9)	Intercontinental Basketball Stadium; 2,272	9–26

May : 0–5 (Home: 0–2; Road: 0–3)

Game	Date	Team	Score	High points	High rebounds	High assists	Location Attendance	Record
36	May 1	@Lioneers	L 112–116	Rayvonte Rice (29)	Rayvonte Rice (10)	Chen Y., Rice (9)	Hsinchu County Stadium; 4,133	9–27
37	May 4	@Braves	L 95–106	Rayvonte Rice (23)	Chen Yu-Wei (12)	Chen Yu-Wei (10)	Taipei Heping Basketball Gymnasium; 5,065	9–28
38	May 11	@Kings	L 101–113	Cameron Clark (30)	Clark, Daniel (10)	Chen Yu-Wei (9)	Xinzhuang Gymnasium; 3,621	9–29
39	May 18	Kings	L 82–121	Chen Yu-Wei (21)	Oli Daniel (9)	Chen Y., Liu (4)	Fengshan Arena; 4,036	9–30
40	May 19	Pilots	L 89–90	Chen Yu-Wei (28)	Oli Daniel (9)	Chen Yu-Wei (6)	Fengshan Arena; 3,168	9–31

2023–24 schedule

== Player statistics ==
Legend
GP	Games played	MPG	Minutes per game	2P%	2-point field goal percentage
3P%	3-point field goal percentage	FT%	Free throw percentage	RPG	Rebounds per game
APG	Assists per game	SPG	Steals per game	BPG	Blocks per game
PPG	Points per game		Led the league

=== Regular season ===
Player	GP	MPG	PPG	2P%	3P%	FT%	RPG	APG	SPG	BPG
Anthony Bennett^{‡}	8	34:11	17.00	70.73%	27.54%	72.41%	9.75	1.50	2.00	0.63
Kavell Bigby-Williams^{‡}	7	19:31	9.14	46.51%	27.27%	57.69%	7.86	0.86	0.14	1.29
Chang Po-Wei	39	20:02	9.13	45.00%	36.80%	84.09%	2.00	1.00	0.90	0.13
Chen Kuan-Chuan	35	13:16	2.20	34.78%	24.53%	46.15%	1.94	0.71	0.34	0.11
Chen Yu-Wei	39	35:11	10.95	45.61%	27.13%	61.90%	5.36	6.21	1.56	0.41
Chiu Po-Chang	13	07:56	2.00	27.27%	16.67%	83.33%	1.23	0.54	0.38	0.00
Cameron Clark^{≠}	8	36:52	27.00	51.11%	33.33%	86.54%	10.25	3.13	1.38	0.50
Oli Daniel	40	22:15	5.95	52.78%	22.00%	64.63%	6.98	0.68	1.03	1.15
Li Ruei-Ci	15	13:15	4.07	28.57%	37.50%	100.00%	2.93	0.40	0.13	0.13
Lin Chih-Wei	36	13:43	3.81	48.72%	35.00%	60.00%	1.78	0.28	0.28	0.47
Liu Cheng-Yen	25	06:31	2.20	16.00%	33.33%	66.67%	0.68	0.76	0.44	0.00
Lu Che-Yi	26	07:23	1.15	33.33%	16.22%	0.00%	1.00	0.38	0.19	0.00
Lu Cheng-Ju	11	28:58	12.91	54.05%	30.21%	53.57%	2.73	2.82	1.00	0.18
Gokul Natesan^{‡}	3	25:29	14.67	52.63%	23.53%	66.67%	1.67	3.67	0.67	0.33
Femi Olujobi	23	38:34	22.83	53.19%	39.87%	73.02%	9.87	2.61	1.04	0.39
Rayvonte Rice^{≠}	19	38:15	24.89	42.36%	31.18%	74.53%	6.79	3.47	2.84	0.37
Shih Chin-Yao	32	23:52	6.97	42.86%	28.07%	71.43%	2.72	2.56	0.72	0.06
Hasheem Thabeet^{≠}	18	27:35	9.44	56.92%	0.00%	55.00%	8.67	1.78	0.78	1.44
Wang Lu-Hsiang	39	20:24	7.03	29.91%	37.84%	87.80%	1.62	0.82	0.41	0.08
Glen Yang^{‡}	11	22:08	7.18	38.57%	18.52%	62.50%	3.36	2.36	1.64	0.00

^{‡} Waived during the season
^{≠} Acquired during the season

== Transactions ==
=== Trades ===
June 19, 2023
To Kaohsiung 17LIVE Steelers

- Chen Kuan-Chuan
- Shih Chin-Yao
- 2023 first-round 4th pick
To Taoyuan Pauian Pilots

- Chou Yi-Hsiang

=== Free Agency ===
==== Re-signed ====
Date	Player	Contract terms	Ref.
August 31, 2023	Lu Che-Yi	—N/a	
September 1, 2023	Gokul Natesan	—N/a	

==== Additions ====
Date	Player	Contract terms	Former team	Ref.
July 25, 2023	Oli Daniel	—N/a	SHU Tigers	
July 25, 2023	Liu Cheng-Yen	—N/a	ISU 137	
August 1, 2023	Femi Olujobi	—N/a	(Puerto Rico) Indios de Mayagüez	
September 12, 2023	Kavell Bigby-Williams	—N/a	(Venezuela) Héroes de Falcón	
September 19, 2023	Li Ruei-Ci	—N/a	New Taipei Kings	
October 2, 2023	Anthony Bennett	—N/a	(South Korea) Goyang Sono Skygunners	
October 31, 2023	Glen Yang	—N/a	(Canada) Winnipeg Sea Bears	
December 13, 2023	Hasheem Thabeet	—N/a	(Tanzania) Pazi	
January 4, 2024	Rayvonte Rice	—N/a	Taichung Suns	
March 13, 2024	Cameron Clark	—N/a	(Bahrain) Manama Club	

==== Subtractions ====
Date	Player	Reason	New Team	Ref.
June 20, 2023	Femi Olujobi	—N/a	(Puerto Rico) Indios de Mayagüez	
June 30, 2023	Jeremy Lin	contract expired	New Taipei Kings	
June 30, 2023	Wang Po-Chih	contract expired	New Taipei Kings	
July 8, 2023	Jay West	mutual agreement to part ways	Hsinchu Lioneers	
July 31, 2023	Cheng Te-Wei	contract expired	Yulon Luxgen Dinos	
July 31, 2023	Lin Jyun-Hao	contract expired	Bank of Taiwan	
July 31, 2023	Lin Po-Hao	mutual agreement to part ways	Taiwan Beer	
July 31, 2023	Sun Szu-Yao	mutual agreement to part ways	Taipei Taishin Mars	
August 7, 2023	Lan Shao-Fu	contract expired	Taichung Suns	
August 29, 2023	Wendell Lewis	contract expired	(Saudi Arabia) Al-Salam	
December 14, 2023	Gokul Natesan	personal matters	—N/a	
December 22, 2023	Anthony Bennett	contract terminated	—N/a	
December 22, 2023	Kavell Bigby-Williams	contract terminated	(Mexico) Astros de Jalisco	
March 26, 2024	Glen Yang	mutual agreement to part ways	(Canada) Vancouver Bandits	

== Awards ==
=== End-of-season awards ===
Recipient	Award	Ref.
Oli Daniel	All-Defensive Team	
Oli Daniel	Rookie of the Year	
Chen Yu-Wei	All-PLG 2nd Team	

=== Players of the Week ===
Week	Recipient	Date awarded	Ref.
Week 2	Lu Cheng-Ju	November 18 - November 19	
Week 24	Rayvonte Rice	April 19 - April 21	
