= 2024–25 Kaohsiung Steelers season =

Taiwanese professional basketball season

Kaohsiung 17LIVE Steelers
2024–25 season
- President: Huang Che-Kuan
- General Manager: Kenny Kao
- Head Coach: Chiu Ta-Tsung
- Arena: Fengshan Arena
- All statistics correct as of July 8, 2024.

The 2024–25 Kaohsiung 17LIVE Steelers season is the franchise's 4th season, its fourth season in the P. League+ (PLG), its 4th in Kaohsiung City. The Steelers is coached by Chiu Ta-Tsung in his second year as head coach.

== Draft ==
Round	Pick	Player	Position	Status	School/club team
1	3	Marcus Quirk	F	Foreign student	NFU
2	6	Chuang Chao-Sheng	G	Local	NCCU
2	7	Wang Kai-Yu	G	Local	NCCU
3	8	Wang Jhe-Yu	F	Local	NTUST
4	10	Lin Hsin-Hsiang	G	Local	NTNU
5	11	Chu Yuk-Kiun	G	Local	NKNU

On July 12, 2024, the Steelers' 2024 first-round 1st draft pick was traded to Taipei Fubon Braves in exchange for Chen Fan Po-Yen, 2024 first-round draft pick and 2024 second-round draft pick. The third-rounder Wang Che-Yu decided not to sign.

== Roster ==
Note: Flags indicate national team eligibility at FIBA-sanctioned events. Players may hold other non-FIBA nationalities not displayed.

2024–25 Kaohsiung 17LIVE Steelers roster
Players
Coaches

Pos.	No.	Nat.	Name	Ht.	Wt.	DOB (YYYY-MM-DD)	From
G	1	(United States)	Isaiah Briscoe (I)	1.91 m (6 ft 3 in)	98 kg (216 lb)	29 – 13 April 1996	Kentucky
G	2	(Taiwan)	Liu Cheng-Yen	1.73 m (5 ft 8 in)	72 kg (159 lb)	24 – 8 July 2001	I-Shou
G	4	(Taiwan)	Li Wei-Ting	1.81 m (5 ft 11 in)	84 kg (185 lb)	25 – 3 October 1999	SHU
F	7	(Taiwan)	Liu Yen-Ting	1.96 m (6 ft 5 in)	96 kg (212 lb)	25 – 17 January 2000	OCU
G	8	(Taiwan)	Lin Hsin-Hsiang	1.85 m (6 ft 1 in)	80 kg (176 lb)	24 – 9 April 2001	NTNU
G	9	(Taiwan)	Chuang Chao-Sheng	1.78 m (5 ft 10 in)	75 kg (165 lb)	22 – 9 February 2003	NCCU
G	13	(Taiwan)	Kao Wei-Lun	1.83 m (6 ft 0 in)	76 kg (168 lb)	23 – 15 December 2001	VNU
F	23	(Taiwan)	Chen Fan Po-Yen	1.96 m (6 ft 5 in)	103 kg (227 lb)	25 – 24 January 2000	Chien Hsin Tech
C	35	(Nigeria)	Oli Daniel (FS)	2.05 m (6 ft 9 in)	102 kg (225 lb)	25 – 7 August 2000	SHU
F	37	(United Kingdom) (Brunei)	Marcus Quirk (FS)	1.98 m (6 ft 6 in)	98 kg (216 lb)		NFU
G	42	(Taiwan)	Wang Kai-Yu	1.90 m (6 ft 3 in)	83 kg (183 lb)	23 – 11 January 2002	NCCU
G	-	(Taiwan) (Indonesia)	Chu Yuk-Kiun	1.83 m (6 ft 0 in)	80 kg (176 lb)	24 – 22 November 2000	NKNU

Head coach

- (Taiwan) Chiu Ta-Tsung

Assistant coach(es)

- (Taiwan) Han Yi-Ping
- (Taiwan) Liu Wen-He

Strength & conditioning coach(es)

- (Taiwan) Chiu Po-Chang

Athletic trainer(s)

- (Taiwan) Bao Chun-Hsin
- (Taiwan) Huang Yu-Chun

Legend

- (C) Team captain
- (I) Import player
- (FS) Foreign student player
- (HP) Heritage player
- (FA) Free agent
- (DP) Unsigned draft pick
- (AI) EASL Asian import
- (S) Suspended
- Injured

- Roster
Updated: September 9, 2024

== Game log ==
=== Preseason ===
2024 preseason game log
Total: 0–0 (Home: 0–0; Road: 0–0)
Preseason : 0–0 (Home: 0–0; Road: 0–0)

Game	Date	Team	Score	High points	High rebounds	High assists	Location Attendance	Record
1	October 12	@Braves					NCKU Chung Cheng Gym	
2	October 13	@Pilots					NCKU Chung Cheng Gym	

2024–25 schedule

== Transactions ==
=== Trades ===
July 12, 2024
To Kaohsiung 17LIVE Steelers

- Chen Fan Po-Yen
- 2024 first-round pick
- 2024 second-round pick
To Taipei Fubon Braves

- 2024 first-round 1st pick

=== Free Agency ===
==== Additions ====
Date	Player	Contract terms	Former team	Ref.
July 19, 2024	Chu Yuk-Kiun	—	NKNU Taiji Turtle	
July 19, 2024	Chuang Chao-Sheng	—	NCCU Griffins	
July 19, 2024	Lin Hsin-Hsiang	—	NTNU Masters	
July 19, 2024	Wang Kai-Yu	—	NCCU Griffins	
July 25, 2024	Liu Yen-Ting	—	Taipei Taishin Mars	
August 2, 2024	Li Wei-Ting	—	New Taipei Kings	
August 2, 2024	Marcus Quirk	—	NFU	
August 9, 2024	Kao Wei-Lun	—	VNU Lions	
September 9, 2024	Isaiah Briscoe	—	(Greece) Maroussi	

==== Subtractions ====
Date	Player	Reason	New Team	Ref.
June 1, 2024	Chen Kuan-Chuan	contract expired	Taipei Taishin Mars	
June 1, 2024	Shih Chin-Yao	contract expired	New Taipei CTBC DEA	
June 4, 2024	Rayvonte Rice	—	(China) Liaoning Flying Leopards	
July 1, 2024	Chang Po-Wei	contract expired	—	
July 1, 2024	Li Ruei-Ci	contract expired	New Taipei CTBC DEA	
July 1, 2024	Lin Chih-Wei	contract expired	Taipei Fubon Braves	
July 1, 2024	Lu Che-Yi	contract expired	—	
July 15, 2024	Lu Cheng-Ju	contract expired	New Taipei Kings	
August 1, 2024	Chen Yu-Wei	contract expired	Taipei Fubon Braves	
August 1, 2024	Wang Lu-Hsiang	contract expired	Taipei Taishin Mars	
August 9, 2024	Chiu Po-Chang	retirement	—	
September 9, 2024	Cameron Clark	—	(Hong Kong) Eastern	
September 9, 2024	Femi Olujobi	—	—	
September 9, 2024	Hasheem Thabeet	—	—	
