= List of Kaohsiung 17LIVE Steelers head coaches =

== Key ==
GC	Games coached
W	Wins
L	Losses
Win%	Winning percentage
#	Number of coaches

== Coaches ==
Note: Statistics are correct through the end of the 2023–24 PLG season.

#	Name	Term	GC	W	L	Win%	GC	W	L	Win%	Achievements
#	Name	Term	Regular season				Playoffs				Achievements
Kaohsiung Steelers
1	DeMarcus Berry	2021–2022	17	4	13	.235	–	–	–	–	
2	Hung Chi-Chao	2021–2022	9	3	6	.333	–	–	–	–	
3	Slavoljub Gorunovic	2021–2022	3	2	1	.667	–	–	–	–	
Kaohsiung 17LIVE Steelers
–	Slavoljub Gorunovic	2022–2023	Left before coaching a game								
–	Hung Chi-Chao	2022–2023	1	0	1	.000	–	–	–	–	
4	Dean Murray	2022–2023	11	1	10	.091	–	–	–	–	
–	Hung Chi-Chao	2022–2023	2	0	2	.000	–	–	–	–	
5	Cheng Chih-Lung	2022–2023	26	16	10	.615	–	–	–	–	
6	Chiu Ta-Tsung	2023–2025	64	11	53	.172				–	
