= 2021–22 Kaohsiung Steelers season =

Taiwanese professional basketball season

Kaohsiung Steelers
2021–22 season
- President: Huang Che-Kuan
- General Manager: Chang Chih-Yen
- Head Coach: DeMarcus Berry (fired); Hung Chi-Chao (interim); Slavoljub Gorunovic (interim)
- Arena: Fengshan Arena
- P. League+: 9-20(.310)
- Scoring leader: Lu Cheng-Ju(16.30)
- Rebounding leader: Chen Yu-Wei(4.25)
- Assists leader: Chen Yu-Wei(5.14)
- Highest home attendance: 5,013 (December 25, 2021)
- Lowest home attendance: 2,137 (April 16, 2022)
- Average home attendance: 3,930
- Biggest win: Steelers 84-64 Pilots (December 18, 2021); Steelers 100-80 Kings (April 30, 2022)
- Biggest defeat: Steelers 70-100 Kings (February 20, 2022); Steelers 76-106 Kings (May 14, 2022)
- All statistics correct as of May 29, 2022.

The 2021–22 Kaohsiung Steelers season was the franchise's 1st season, its first season in the P. LEAGUE+ (PLG), its 1st in Kaohsiung City. The Steelers are coached by DeMarcus Berry in his first year as head coach.

On March 19, head coach DeMarcus Berry was fired after a seven straight loss, he was replaced by assistant coach Hung Chi-Chao on an interim basis.

== Draft ==
Round	Pick	Player	Position	Status	School/club team
1	2	Chen Yu-Wei	G	Local	NTNU
1	5	Lin Jyun-Hao	F	Local	NTUA
1	8	Lan Shao-Fu	C	Local	NTSU
2	9	Liu Chun-Ting	F	Local	UCH
3	13	Cheng Te-Wei	F	Local	SHU
4	15	Matthew Yang	G	Overseas Chinese	Taichung Dreamers Academy
5	16	Austin Derrick	C	Foreign Student	UCH

The Steelers acquired 2021 first-round draft pick from Formosa Taishin Dreamers in exchange for $500000 cash considerations. The second rounder, Liu Chun-Ting had joined Tainan TSG GhostHawks of the T1 League.

== Standings ==
Team	GP	W	L	PCT
z − Hsinchu JKO Lioneers	30	20	10	.667
x − Formosa Taishin Dreamers	30	19	11	.633
x − Taipei Fubon Braves	30	18	12	.600
x − New Taipei Kings	30	16	14	.533
Kaohsiung Steelers	29	9	20	.310
Taoyuan Pilots	29	7	22	.241

== Roster ==
Note: Flags indicate national team eligibility at FIBA-sanctioned events. Players may hold other non-FIBA nationalities not displayed.

2021–22 Kaohsiung Steelers roster
Players
Coaches

Pos.	No.	Nat.	Name	Ht.	Wt.	DOB (YYYY-MM-DD)	From
C	0	(Saint Vincent and the Grenadines)	Austin Derrick	1.95 m (6 ft 5 in)	115 kg (254 lb)	30 – 31 July 1995	Chien Hsin Tech
G	4	(Chinese Taipei)	Chen Yu-Wei	1.83 m (6 ft 0 in)	85 kg (187 lb)	25 – 29 December 1999	NTNU
G	6	(Chinese Taipei)	Chou Yi-Hsiang	1.91 m (6 ft 3 in)	99 kg (218 lb)	34 – 4 February 1991	SLCC
F	7	(Chinese Taipei)	Chang Po-Wei (S)	1.90 m (6 ft 3 in)	90 kg (198 lb)	35 – 22 July 1990	NTUA
G	8	(Chinese Taipei)	Wang Lu-Hsiang	1.85 m (6 ft 1 in)	82 kg (181 lb)	27 – 21 December 1997	CCUT
C	10	(Chinese Taipei)	Wang Po-Chih	1.95 m (6 ft 5 in)	130 kg (287 lb)	29 – 29 October 1996	NTSU
F	11	(Chinese Taipei)	Lin Jyun-Hao	1.93 m (6 ft 4 in)	88 kg (194 lb)	27 – 18 January 1998	NTUA
F	12	(Chinese Taipei)	Cheng Te-Wei	1.93 m (6 ft 4 in)	98 kg (216 lb)	30 – 8 October 1995	SHU
F	13	(Chinese Taipei)	Lu Cheng-Ju (C)	1.94 m (6 ft 4 in)	93 kg (205 lb)	39 – 13 April 1986	TPEC
G	15	(Chinese Taipei)	Lu Che-Yi	1.87 m (6 ft 2 in)	83 kg (183 lb)	32 – 15 July 1993	I-Shou
F	20	(Canada)	Anthony Bennett (I)	2.03 m (6 ft 8 in)	111 kg (245 lb)	32 – 14 March 1993	UNLV
C	23	(Chinese Taipei)	Lan Shao-Fu	1.95 m (6 ft 5 in)	100 kg (220 lb)	28 – 21 March 1997	NTSU
F	24	(United States)	Taylor Braun (I)	2.01 m (6 ft 7 in)	95 kg (209 lb)	34 – 6 July 1991	North Dakota State
G	30	(United States) (Chinese Taipei)	Matthew Yang	1.87 m (6 ft 2 in)	90 kg (198 lb)	30 – 20 October 1995	UCLA
C	34	(United States)	Keith Benson (I)	2.11 m (6 ft 11 in)	107 kg (236 lb)	37 – 13 August 1988	Oakland
G	63	(Chinese Taipei)	Peng Chun-Yen	1.83 m (6 ft 0 in)	81 kg (179 lb)	35 – 5 December 1989	MingDao

Head coach

- (Serbia) Slavoljub Gorunovic (interim)

Assistant coach(es)

- (Serbia) Slavoljub Gorunovic
- (Chinese Taipei) Hung Chi-Chao
- (Chinese Taipei) Lee Wan-Ju
- (Chinese Taipei) Tzou Hua-Kung

Strength & conditioning coach(es)

- (Chinese Taipei) Chen Sheng-Chuan

Athletic trainer(s)

- (Chinese Taipei) Bao Chun-Hsin
- (Chinese Taipei) An Che-Wei (assistant)

Team manager

- (Chinese Taipei) Shen Chiu-Chan

Legend

- (C) Team captain
- (I) Import player
- (S) Suspended
- Injured

- Roster
Updated: 28 April, 2022

== Game log ==
=== Preseason ===
2021 preseason game log Total: 1-2 (Home: 1–1; Road: 0–1)
Game	Date	Team	Score	High points	High rebounds	High assists	Location Attendance	Record
1	November 13	Formosa Taishin Dreamers	L 89-102	Lu Cheng-Ju (17)	Cheng Te-Wei (7); Lan Shao-Fu (7)	Chen Yu-Wei (6)	Fengshan Arena; 4,125	0-1
2	November 14	Taipei Fubon Braves	W 95-89	Lu Cheng-Ju (35)	Chen Yu-Wei (9)	Chen Yu-Wei (6); Wang Lu-Hsiang (6); Peng Chun-Yen (6)	Fengshan Arena; 4,866	1-1
3	November 21	@New Taipei Kings	L 82-100	Chen Yu-Wei (18)	Lin Jyun-Hao (9)	Cheng Te-Wei (3); Lu Cheng-Ju (3)	National Taiwan University Sports Center; 3,087	1-2

=== Regular season ===
2021–22 regular season game log Total: 9-20 (Home: 5–10; Road: 4–10)
Game	Date	Team	Score	High points	High rebounds	High assists	Location Attendance	Record
1	December 5	@Taipei Fubon Braves	L 82-107	Anthony Tucker (17); Keith Benson (17)	Keith Benson (15)	Anthony Tucker (9)	Taipei Heping Basketball Gymnasium; 6,062	0-1
2	December 12	@Hsinchu JKO Lioneers	L 95-105	Anthony Tucker (21)	Keith Benson (10)	Anthony Tucker (7)	Hsinchu County Stadium; 4,657	0-2
3	December 18	@Taoyuan Pilots	W 84-64	Keith Benson (27)	Keith Benson (17)	Anthony Tucker (8)	NTSU Arena; 3,288	1-2
4	December 25	Formosa Taishin Dreamers	L 104-106	Anthony Tucker (27)	Taylor Braun (12)	Anthony Tucker (10)	Fengshan Arena; 5,013	1-3
5	December 26	Taoyuan Pilots	L 70-86	Keith Benson (18)	Keith Benson (18)	Chen Yu-Wei (3)	Fengshan Arena; 3,229	1-4
6	January 8	@Hsinchu JKO Lioneers	W 98-97	Wang Po-Chih (25)	Keith Benson (9)	Taylor Braun (11)	Hsinchu County Stadium; 4,234	2-4
7	January 14	Taoyuan Pilots	L 94-101	Keith Benson (28)	Keith Benson (12)	Taylor Braun (9)	Fengshan Arena; 3,011	2-5
8	January 16	@Formosa Taishin Dreamers	L 82-89	Anthony Tucker (22)	Taylor Braun (14)	Chen Yu-Wei (5)	Intercontinental Basketball Stadium; 3,000	2-6
9	January 21	Hsinchu JKO Lioneers	W 105-92	Lu Cheng-Ju (32)	Keith Benson (14)	Chen Yu-Wei (10); Taylor Braun (10)	Fengshan Arena; 3,952	3-6
10	January 23	Taipei Fubon Braves	W 94-82	Keith Benson (21)	Keith Benson (9); Taylor Braun (9)	Taylor Braun (11)	Fengshan Arena; 4,798	4-6
11	February 13	@Formosa Taishin Dreamers	L 68-74	Lu Cheng-Ju (16)	Keith Benson (13)	Taylor Braun (6)	Intercontinental Basketball Stadium; 3,000	4-7
12	February 19	Taipei Fubon Braves	L 87-106	Keith Benson (19)	Keith Benson (18)	Chen Yu-Wei (7)	Fengshan Arena; 4,382	4-8
13	February 20	New Taipei Kings	L 70-100	Keith Benson (21)	Keith Benson (18)	Chen Yu-Wei (5)	Fengshan Arena; 4,018	4-9
PPD	February 27	@New Taipei Kings	Postponed					
14	March 5	@Hsinchu JKO Lioneers	L 87-97	Anthony Bennett (20)	Keith Benson (12)	Peng Chun-Yen (9)	Hsinchu County Stadium; 6,035	4-10
15	March 12	Hsinchu JKO Lioneers	L 95-103	Lu Cheng-Ju (23)	Anthony Bennett (18)	Chen Yu-Wei (9)	Fengshan Arena; 4,325	4-11
16	March 13	New Taipei Kings	L 93-98	Anthony Bennett (29)	Anthony Bennett (15)	Chen Yu-Wei (10)	Fengshan Arena; 4,123	4-12
17	March 18	@Taipei Fubon Braves	L 91-111	Manny Harris (40)	Manny Harris (10)	Manny Harris (5)	Taipei Heping Basketball Gymnasium; 5,875	4-13
18	March 20	@Formosa Taishin Dreamers	L 88-109	Manny Harris (32)	Keith Benson (12)	Chen Yu-Wei (9)	Intercontinental Basketball Stadium; 3,000	4-14
19	March 26	Formosa Taishin Dreamers	W 95-80	Chen Yu-Wei (29)	Manny Harris (14)	Chou Yi-Hsiang (4)	Fengshan Arena; 4,812	5-14
20	March 27	Hsinchu JKO Lioneers	L 96-107	Manny Harris (30)	Anthony Bennett (20)	Chen Yu-Wei (6)	Fengshan Arena; 4,532	5-15
21	April 2	@New Taipei Kings	L 94-105	Anthony Bennett (36)	Anthony Bennett (13)	Taylor Braun (10)	Xinzhuang Gymnasium; 4,333	5-16
22	April 4	@Taipei Fubon Braves	L 97-113	Taylor Braun (27)	Taylor Braun (17)	Taylor Braun (11)	Taipei Heping Basketball Gymnasium; 5,955	5-17
23	April 10	@Taoyuan Pilots	W 107-102	Anthony Bennett (39)	Anthony Bennett (19)	Chen Yu-Wei (7); Taylor Braun (7)	Taoyuan Arena; 1,936	6-17
24	April 16	Taoyuan Pilots	L 104-106(OT)	Taylor Braun (29)	Taylor Braun (12)	Taylor Braun (6)	Fengshan Arena; 2,137	6-18
25	April 17	Taipei Fubon Braves	L 87-109	Lu Cheng-Ju (21)	Anthony Bennett (14)	Taylor Braun (6)	Fengshan Arena; 4,563	6-19
26	April 24	@New Taipei Kings	W 101-92	Anthony Bennett (37)	Anthony Bennett (19)	Taylor Braun (11)	Xinzhuang Gymnasium; 2,012	7-19
27	April 30	New Taipei Kings	W 100-80	Anthony Bennett (28)	Anthony Bennett (20)	Taylor Braun (6)	Fengshan Arena; 3,215	8-19
28	May 1	Formosa Taishin Dreamers	W 120-103	Anthony Bennett (35)	Anthony Bennett (13)	Taylor Braun (9)	Fengshan Arena; 2,843	9-19
PPD	May 7	@Taoyuan Pilots	Postponed					
29	May 14	@New Taipei Kings	L 76-106	Taylor Braun (17)	Taylor Braun (12)	Taylor Braun (12)	Xinzhuang Gymnasium; 2,194	9-20
PPD	May 16	@Taoyuan Pilots	Postponed					

== Player statistics ==
Legend
GP	Games played	MPG	Minutes per game	2P%	2-point field goal percentage
3P%	3-point field goal percentage	FT%	Free throw percentage	RPG	Rebounds per game
APG	Assists per game	SPG	Steals per game	BPG	Blocks per game
PPG	Points per game		Led the league

=== Regular season ===
Player	GP	MPG	PPG	2P%	3P%	FT%	RPG	APG	SPG	BPG
Austin Derrick	10	06:32	1.80	45.00%	0.00%	0.00%	2.20	0.30	0.20	0.20
Anthony Tucker	6	41:25	20.17	50.91%	27.69%	55.00%	8.83	6.50	2.00	0.00
Manny Harris	4	40:27	29.25	47.06%	26.47%	91.30%	9.50	3.50	3.00	0.50
Chen Yu-Wei	28	38:33	13.04	45.42%	31.00%	72.97%	4.25	5.14	2.25	0.32
Chou Yi-Hsiang	9	40:50	12.56	40.43%	28.99%	68.18%	4.89	3.00	1.00	0.00
Chang Po-Wei	Did not play									
Wang Lu-Hsiang	23	19:43	5.83	42.59%	30.00%	100.00%	1.48	0.87	0.43	0.04
Wang Po-Chih	20	18:26	6.50	41.56%	37.78%	60.00%	4.10	1.05	0.30	0.20
Lin Jyun-Hao	22	08:19	1.64	41.67%	8.33%	50.00%	1.32	0.32	0.23	0.18
Cheng Te-Wei	17	16:12	3.35	29.55%	27.27%	44.44%	2.59	0.82	1.06	0.18
Lu Cheng-Ju	23	38:27	16.30	48.48%	30.18%	62.16%	3.78	2.30	1.35	0.52
Lu Che-Yi	26	16:31	5.15	36.84%	31.31%	72.22%	3.08	1.23	0.81	0.12
Anthony Bennett	13	34:46	25.23	60.93%	31.63%	78.46%	14.08	1.77	1.38	1.08
Lan Shao-Fu	24	18:54	6.96	43.16%	35.29%	61.90%	3.08	0.38	0.46	0.29
Taylor Braun	17	39:56	14.41	43.16%	36.04%	72.50%	9.94	8.41	1.88	0.24
Matthew Yang	11	06:48	1.36	33.33%	15.38%	50.00%	1.45	0.18	0.36	0.00
Keith Benson	15	34:08	18.00	53.24%	11.11%	50.75%	13.47	1.27	1.07	0.87
Peng Chun-Yen	17	17:19	2.29	34.78%	20.00%	41.67%	2.59	2.71	1.35	0.00

- Reference：

== Transactions ==
=== Trades ===
October 21, 2021
October 27, 2021
To Kaohsiung Steelers

- Peng Chun-Yen
To Kaohsiung Steelers

- Wang Lu-Hsiang
To Taoyuan Pilots

- 2023 first-round pick
To Taipei Fubon Braves

- 2022 first-round pick

=== Free Agency ===
==== Additions ====
Date	Player	Contract terms	Former team	Ref.
June 25, 2021	Anthony Tucker	—	Formosa Taishin Dreamers	
June 28, 2021	Wang Po-Chih	—	Formosa Taishin Dreamers	
July 1, 2021	Chang Po-Wei	—	Taipei Fubon Braves	
July 13, 2021	Lu Cheng-Ju	3-year contract, worth unknown	Yulon Luxgen Dinos	
August 11, 2021	Chen Yu-Wei	—	NTNU Master	
August 16, 2021	Lin Jyun-Hao	—	NTUA Sharks	
August 18, 2021	Cheng Te-Wei	—	SHU Tigers	
August 23, 2021	Lan Shao-Fu	—	NTSU	
August 25, 2021	Matthew Yang	—	Taichung Dreamers Academy	
September 16, 2021	Austin Derrick	—	UCH	
October 1, 2021	Keith Benson	—	(Bulgaria) BC Levski Sofia	
October 15, 2021	Lu Che-Yi	—	Hsinchu JKO Lioneers	
October 26, 2021	Taylor Braun	—	(Israel) Maccabi Haifa B.C.	
February 9, 2022	Anthony Bennett	—	(Israel) Hapoel Jerusalem B.C.	
February 16, 2022	Chou Yi-Hsiang	—	(China) Beijing Ducks	
March 2, 2022	Manny Harris	—	(Greece) AEK B.C.	

==== Subtractions ====
Date	Player	Reason	New Team	Ref.
February 8, 2022	Anthony Tucker	released	Taichung Wagor Suns	
April 1, 2022	Manny Harris	injury	Kaohsiung Steelers	

== Awards ==
=== End-of-Season Awards ===
Recipient	Award	Ref.
Chen Yu-Wei	Steals Leader	
Chen Yu-Wei	PLG All-Defensive Team	
Chen Yu-Wei	Rookie of the Year	
Chen Yu-Wei	All-PLG Team	
Lu Cheng-Ju	All-PLG Team	

=== Players of the Month ===
Recipient	Award	Month awarded	Ref.
Lu Cheng-Ju	January Most Valuable Player	January	

=== Players of the Week ===
Week	Recipient	Date awarded	Ref.
Preseason	Lu Cheng-Ju	November 13 - November 14	
Week 6	Wang Po-Chih	January 7 - January 9	
Week 8	Lu Cheng-Ju	January 21 - January 23	
Week 20	Chen Yu-Wei	April 29 - May 1	
