= 2019 NBA G League draft =

General information
- Sport: Basketball
- Date(s): October 26, 2019

Overview
- League: NBA
- First selection: Anthony Lawrence II, Northern Arizona Suns

The 2019 NBA G League draft was the 19th draft of the National Basketball Association G League. The draft was held on October 26, 2019, just before the 2019–20 season. Anthony Lawrence II was selected with the first overall pick by the Northern Arizona Suns.

== Key ==
Pos.	G	F	C
Position	Guard	Forward	Center

^	Denotes player who has been selected to (an) NBA G League International Challenge Teams(s)
*	Denotes player who has been selected to (an) NBA G League International Challenge Team(s) and was also selected in an NBA draft
†	Denotes player who was also selected in an NBA Draft

== Draft ==
=== First round ===
Pick	Player	Pos.	Nationality	Team	College/Country
1	Anthony Lawrence II	F	United States	Northern Arizona Suns	Miami (Florida)
2	Trey Mourning	F	United States	Sioux Falls Skyforce	Georgetown
3	Madit Tieny Dak	F	South Sudan	Texas Legends	South Sudan
4	Tyler Hall	G	United States	Westchester Knicks	Montana State
5	Trevon Duval	G	United States	Iowa Wolves	Duke
6	Isaiah Reese	G	United States	Austin Spurs	Canisius
7	Jalen Hudson	G	United States	Capital City Go-Go	Florida
8	Sheldon Mac	F/G	United States	South Bay Lakers	Miami (Florida)
9	Alan Herndon	F	United States	Canton Charge	Wyoming
10	Michale Kyser	F/C	United States	Lakeland Magic	Louisiana Tech
11	Cameron Lard	F	United States	College Park Skyhawks	Iowa State
12	Alex Stein	G	United States	Canton Charge	Southern Indiana
13	Ronshad Shabazz	G	United States	College Park Skyhawks	Appalachian State
14	Demajeo Wiggins	F	United States	Greensboro Swarm	Bowling Green
15	Keljin Blevins	F	United States	Northern Arizona Suns	Montana State
16	E. C. Matthews	G	United States	Erie BayHawks	Rhode Island
17	Marcus Graves	G	United States	Stockton Kings	Sacramento State
18	Hasheem Thabeet†	C	Tanzania	Fort Wayne Mad Ants	UConn
19	Matt Kenyon	G	Australia	Capital City Go-Go	Australia
20	Shaqquan Aaron	G	United States	Memphis Hustle	USC
21	Jahmal McMurray	G	United States	Northern Arizona Suns	SMU
22	Kerwin Roach	G	United States	Westchester Knicks	Texas
23	Tra Holder	G	United States	Texas Legends	Arizona State
24	Ryan Taylor	G	United States	Lakeland Magic	Marshall
25	Wyatt Walker	F	United States	Oklahoma City Blue	NC State
26	Kendarius Ash	F	United States	South Bay Lakers	Lane College
27	Miles Reynolds	G	United States	Long Island Nets	Oklahoma
28	Kavin Gilder-Tilbury	F	United States	Rio Grande Valley Vipers	Texas State

=== Other notable draftees ===
Rnd.	Pick	Player	Pos.	Nationality	Team	College/Country
2	29	Stephen Thompson Jr.	G	United States	Wisconsin Herd	Oregon State
2	38	Vander Blue^	G	United States	Santa Cruz Warriors	Marquette
2	39	Tre Kelley	G	United States	Capital City Go-Go	South Carolina
2	40	Jordan Brangers	G	United States	Santa Cruz Warriors	South Plains
2	43	Terrence Drisdom	G	United States	Delaware Blue Coats	Cal Poly Pomona
3	62	Martaveous McKnight	G	United States	Delaware Blue Coats	Arkansas–Pine Bluff
3	64	Mike Davis	F	United States	Raptors 905	Illinois
4	67	Curtis Washington	F/C	United States	Maine Red Claws	Georgia State
4	72	Joe Cremo	G	United States	Long Island Nets	Villanova
