= 2023 PLG draft =

General information
- Sport: Basketball
- Date(s): July 11, 2023
- Location: Taipei New Horizon (Taipei)
- Network(s): YouTube

Overview
- 8 total selections in 2 rounds
- League: P. League+
- First selection: Joof Alasan (Hsinchu JKO Lioneers)

The 2023 PLG draft, the third edition of the P. League+'s annual draft, was originally scheduled on July 12, 2023 at Taipei New Horizon. The draft was rescheduled to July 11, 2023.

== Draft selections ==
G	Guard	F	Forward	C	Center

^{#}	Denotes player who has never appeared in an PLG regular season or playoff game
^{~}	Denotes player who has been selected as Rookie of the Year

Rnd.	Pick	Player	Pos.	Status	Team	School / club team
1	1	Joof Alasan^{#}	C	Foreign student	Hsinchu JKO Lioneers	NTUA
1	2	Qiao Chu-Yu	F	Local	Taoyuan Pauian Pilots(from Steelers) (Note: October 21, 2021: Kaohsiung Steelers to Taoyuan Pilots: Pilots acquired 2023 first-round pick; Steelers acquired Peng Chun-Yen)	FJU
1	3	Ting Kuang-Hao	F	Local	Formosa Taishin Dreamers	UCH
1	4	Oli Daniel^{~}	C	Foreign student	Kaohsiung 17LIVE Steelers(from Pilots) (Note: June 19, 2023: Taoyuan Pauian Pilots to Kaohsiung 17LIVE Steelers: Steelers acquired Chen Kuan-Chuan, Shih Chin-Yao, 2023 first-round 4th pick; Pilots acquired Chou Yi-Hsiang)	SHU
1	5	Su Pei-Kai	G	Local	New Taipei Kings	NTUA
1	6	Tsai Chen-Yueh^{#}	F	Local	Taipei Fubon Braves	NKNU
2	7	Wang Yi-Fan^{#}	G	Local	Hsinchu JKO Lioneers	FJU
2	8	Liu Cheng-Yen	G	Local	Kaohsiung 17LIVE Steelers	ISU

== Notable undrafted players ==
These players were not selected in the 2023 PLG draft, but have played at least one game in the P. League+.

Player	Pos.	Status	School/club team
Liu Guang-Shang	F	Local	FJU

== Combine ==
The 2023 Draft Combine will be held on July 5 at National Taiwan University of Arts Gymnasium.

== Entrants ==
=== Local ===
- Chang Chao-Chen – F, NTNU
- Chen Hao-Xiang – F, NTSU
- Chen Li-Hsing – G, NTSU
- Chen Yi – G, GWU
- Chen Zhao-Qun – F, NTUST
- Chiang Hao-Wen – G, NTNU
- Chien Ho-Yu – G, SHU
- Fan Zhe-Hao – G, STU
- Hsieh Cheng-An – F, NTSU
- Hsiung Che-Yen – G, PCCU
- Hsu Ching-En – F, NTNU
- Huang Tzu-Hsuan – F, NCCU
- Kuo Chen-Fu – F, NKNU
- Li Pei-Cheng – G, FJU
- Liao Ching-Tai – C, NKNU
- Lin Li – G, NCCU
- Liu Cheng-Yen – G, ISU
- Liu Guang-Shang – F, FJU
- Liu Yan-Ting – C, OCU
- Qiao Chu-Yu – F, FJU
- Su Pei-Kai – G, NTUA
- Ting Kuang-Hao – F, UCH
- Tsai Chen-Yueh – F, NKNU
- Tsai Houng-Yang – G, FJU
- Tsai Ya-Hsuan – G, NPTU
- Tu Yi-Han – F, NCCU
- Wang Cheng-Wen – F, ISU
- Wang Yi-Fan – G, FJU
- Wu Pei-Chia – C, SHU
- Wu Shao-Qi – G, PCCU
- Wu Zheng-Xin – F, CUMT
- Yang Hao-Wei – G, PCCU

=== Foreign student ===
Kings, Lioneers and Steelers were the teams eligible to select foreign students in the draft.

- (The Gambia) Joof Alasan – C, NTUA
- (Macau) Chan Chon-Wai – G, NKNU
- (Nigeria) Oli Daniel – C, SHU
- (Mongolia) Saruul-Erdene Enkhbaatar – G, CTBC
- (Mongolia) Sugar-Ochir Erdenetsetseg – C, CTBC
- (Democratic Republic of the Congo) Jerome Ndanga – F, PCCU
- (Latvia) Rolands Opalevs – G, NCCU
- (Nigeria) Sebastine – C, SHU
