= Anthony Lawrence (basketball) =

American basketball player

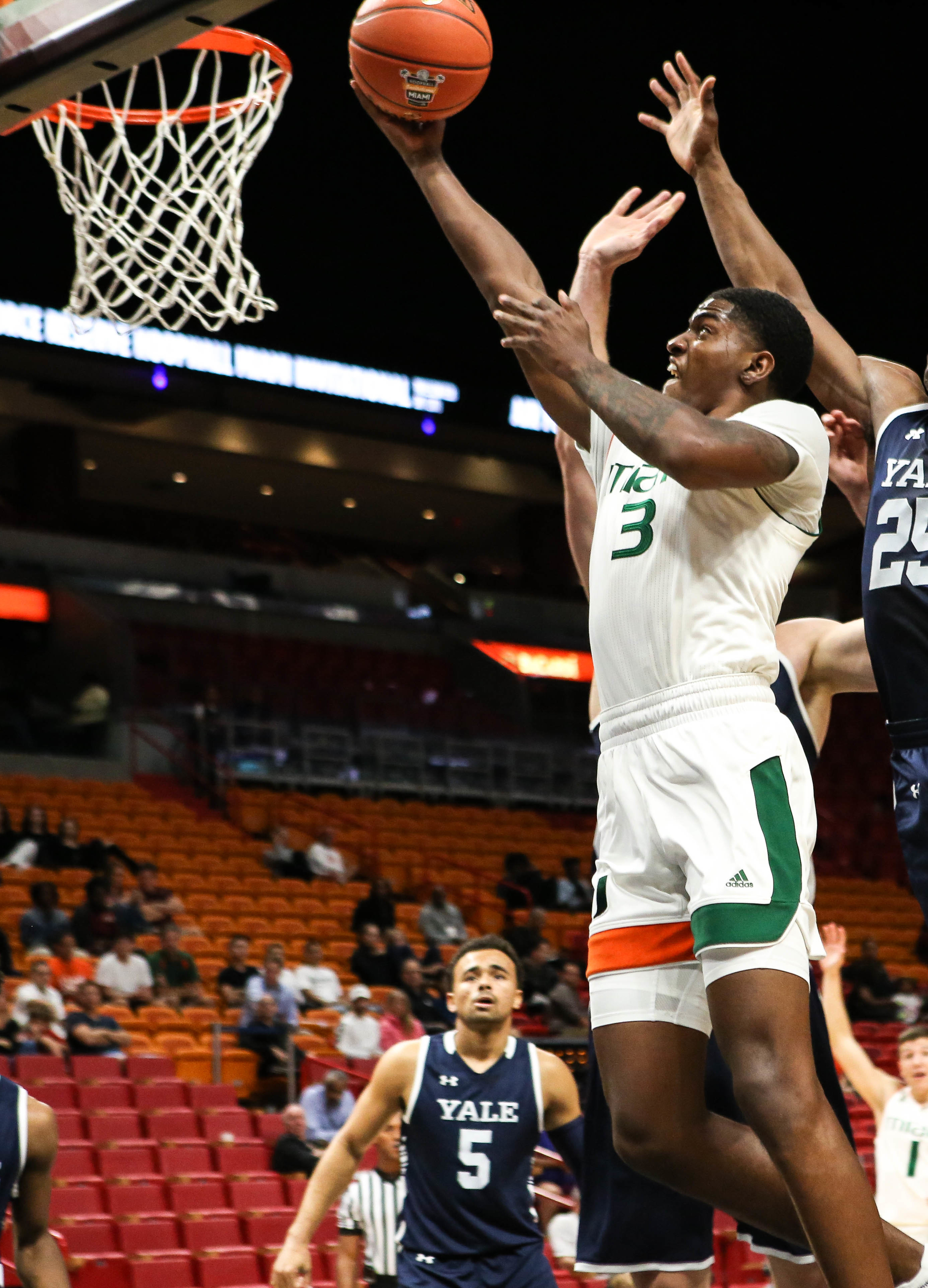
- Anthony Lawrence with Miami in December 2018

Free agent
- Position: Power forward / small forward

Personal information
- Born: September 6, 1996 (age 30) St. Petersburg, Florida, U.S.
- Listed height: 6 ft 7 in (2.01 m)
- Listed weight: 210 lb (95 kg)

Career information
- High school: Lakewood (St. Petersburg, Florida)
- College: Miami (Florida) (2015–2019)
- NBA draft: 2019: undrafted
- Playing career: 2019–present

Career history
- 2019–2020: Northern Arizona Suns
- 2021: Fort Wayne Mad Ants
- 2022–2023: SeaHorses Mikawa
- 2023–2024: Taoyuan Pilots
- 2024: Yokohama Excellence
- Stats at Basketball Reference

Anthony Lawrence II (born September 6, 1996) is an American basketball player who last played for the Yokohama Excellence. He played college basketball for the University of Miami. Standing at 6 ft 7 in (2.01 m), he plays at the power forward and small forward positions.

== Early life and college career ==
Lawrence attended Lakewood High School in St. Petersburg, Florida, where he led the team to the Class 5A state championship game as a junior. In sophomore campaign, he averaged 21 points, eight rebounds and four steals.

Lawrence played college basketball at the University of Miami, where he averaged 12.5 points, 6.6 rebounds, 3.1 assists and 1.2 steals per game as a senior. Lawrence finished his career ranked 34th in career scoring at Miami with 1,043 points. He played in 130 career games, which tied for fifth most in program history. Lawrence wrapped up his career ranked ninth in career steals at UM with 141 and 10th in career minutes with 3,300.

== Professional career ==
=== Northern Arizona Suns (2019–2020) ===
After going undrafted in the 2019 NBA draft, Lawrence joined the Cleveland Cavaliers for the 2019 NBA Summer League.

On July 22, 2019, Lawrence signed his first professional contract with Hapoel Be'er Sheva of the Israeli Premier League. On October 2, 2019, he parted ways with Be'er Sheva after appearing in one pre-season tournament game.

On October 20, 2019, Lawrence signed with the Utah Jazz, but he was immediately waived after training camp.

On October 26, 2019, Lawrence was selected with the first overall pick in the 2019 NBA G League draft by the Northern Arizona Suns, the G League affiliate of the Phoenix Suns.

=== Fort Wayne Mad Ants (2021) ===
On December 30, 2020, Lawrence was traded to the Fort Wayne Mad Ants.

=== Sea Horses Mikawa (2022–2023) ===
On February 5, 2022, Lawrence signed with the SeaHorses Mikawa of the B.League.

== Personal life ==
Lawrence is the son of Anthony Sr and Zelia. He is married and with 3 kids. He has one sister named Taylor. His uncle, Patrick, also played at Miami from 1991 to 1994. Lawrence played in first basketball game at age four. His father, Anthony Lawrence Sr., played college basketball at Alabama and Miami from 1988 to 1992 and after college, played overseas in Portugal, Mexico and the Dominican Republic.
