= Slavoljub Gorunović =

Serbian basketball coach

Personal information
- Born: February 15, 1970 (age 56)
- Coaching career: 2007–present

Career history

Coaching
- 2015–2016: Trabzonspor (Player development coach)
- 2016: Ase Essaouria
- 2018: BC Kazma (Player development coach)
- 2018–2019: Tianjin Gold Lions (associate HC)
- 2021–2022: FFB Suzhou
- 2021: US Monastir
- 2021–2022: Kaohsiung Steelers (assistant)
- 2022: Kaohsiung Steelers
- 2023: TNT Tropang Giga (consultant)
- 2024: IHC Apes
- 2024: Cameroon national team - consultant coach
- 2025: Turks and Caicos Basketball

Career highlights
- As consultant: PBA champion (2023 Governors')

Slavoljub Gorunović (Serbian: Славољуб Горуновић; born February 15, 1970), nicknamed Lale, is a Serbian basketball coach.

== Career ==
Gorunović worked in several countries like his home country Serbia, Qatar, Russia, Turkey, Morocco, Kuwait, China, Tunisia, Taiwan, and in the Philippines.

His work in Taiwan was being an assistant coach to the Kaohsiung Steelers, and when the head coach was fired, he was promoted. He was fired later when the new season began.

His notable work was from TNT Tropang Giga, when he was hired as an active consultant to interim coach and general manager Jojo Lastimosa. Guronovic runs the everyday practices and timeout huddles. They won a championship in 2023 PBA Governors' Cup finals defeating Barangay Ginebra. He served on the team until the first conference of the next season.

He later coached the IHC Apes and was later fired.

Cameroon national team - consultant coach (2024)

SG Apes (Mongolia)- head coach (2024/25)

Apes went from the 7th seed with a win/lose ratio of 4:6 to w/l ratio of 12:2 with a six game winning streak and repeated the best result in the club's history, passed the quarterfinals of the playoffs, and advanced to the semifinals of the playoffs.

Tangerang Hawks (Indonesia) - head coach (2025)

Turks and Caicos Basketball – National team head coach and technical consultant (2026)

Turks and Caicos Basketball competed in the FIBA AmeriCup Pre-Qualifiers for Senior National Teams and went on a 3:0 winning streak and defeated the tournament hosts, Guyana, the 113th-ranked team in the FIBA World Rankings, Dominica and Bermuda (128. by FIBA Ranking) and lost only the last game against Antigua and Barbuda (120).

Turks and Caicos Basketball achieved this with the youngest team in the tournament, made up of talented young players, many of whom had only high school basketball experience, along with a few former college players who had not played.
