= Wendell Lewis =

American basketball player

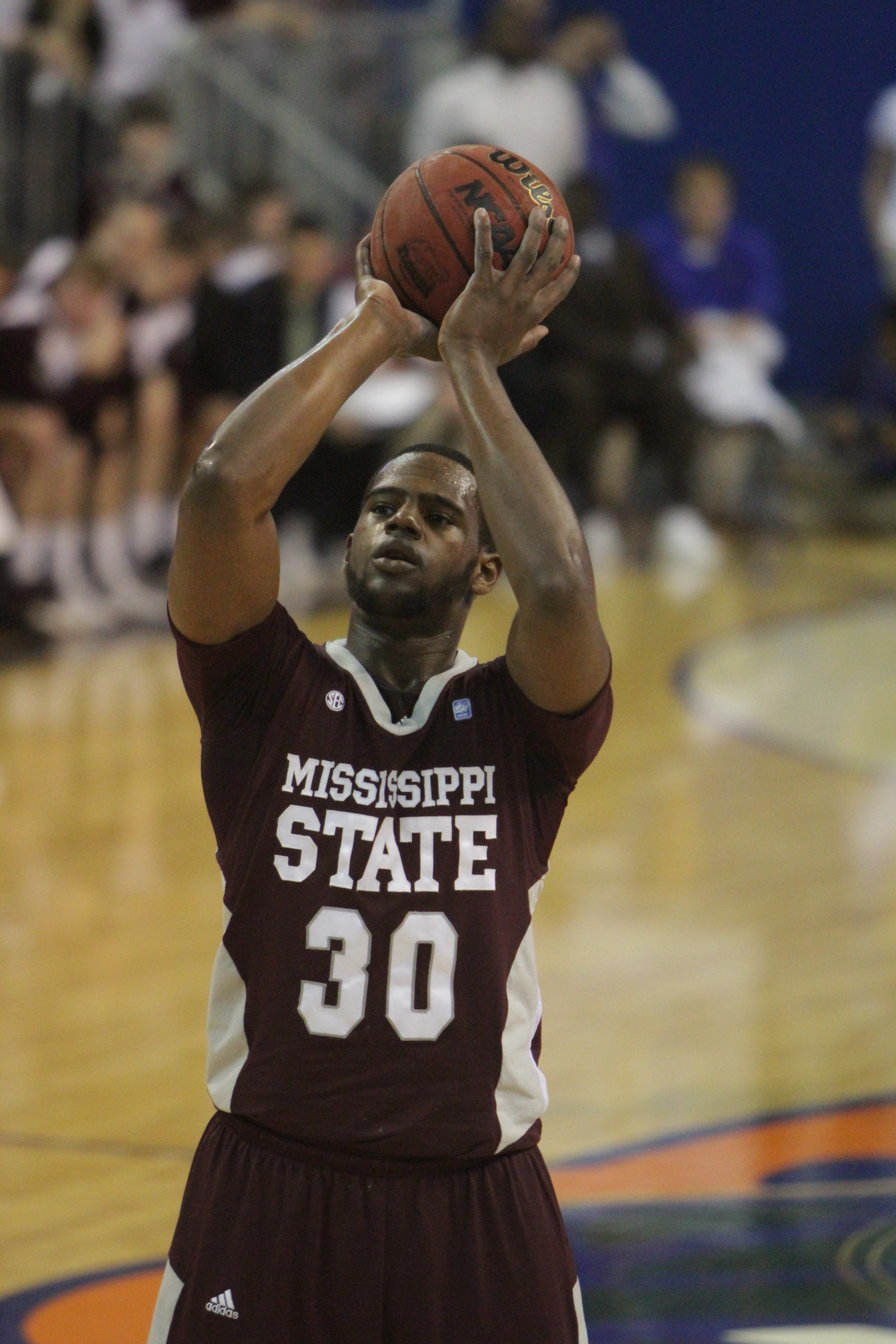
- Lewis with Mississippi State in 2012

No. 35 – Caesar Keelung Black Kites
- Position: Power forward
- League: Super Basketball League

Personal information
- Born: September 21, 1989 (age 37) Selma, Alabama, U.S.
- Listed height: 204 cm (6 ft 8 in)
- Listed weight: 119 kg (262 lb)

Career information
- High school: Selma (Selma, Alabama)
- College: Mississippi State (2009–2013); Alabama State (2014–2015)
- NBA draft: 2015: undrafted
- Playing career: 2015–present

Career history
- 2015: Universidad (Santa Cruz)
- 2016: Louaize
- 2016: Halcones de Ciudad Obregón
- 2016: Cañeros del Este
- 2016–2017: Louaize
- 2017–2018: Tokyo Hachioji Trains
- 2018: Saitama Broncos
- 2018: Universidad (Santa Cruz)
- 2019: Caucasus International University
- 2019–2020: Vera
- 2020–2022: Chernomorets
- 2022: Benfica
- 2022–2023: Ravenna
- 2023: Elitzur Eito Ashkelon
- 2023: Kaohsiung 17LIVE Steelers
- 2023–2024: Rajawali Medan
- 2024: New Taipei Kings
- 2024–2025: Satria Muda Pertamina
- 2025–present: Keelung Black Kites / Caesar Keelung Black Kites
- 2026–present: Selangor Hornbills

Career highlights
- Portuguese League champion (2022); P. League+ champion (2024)

Wendell Lewis (born September 21, 1989) is an American professional basketball player for Caesar Keelung Black Kites of the Super Basketball League. Before, he has played professionally in Lebanon, Mexico, Georgia, Indonesia and Japan.

Lewis played for Chernomorets from 2020 to 2022. He averaged 19.6 points, 8.7 rebounds, 1.5 steals and 1.1 assists per game in the 2021-22 season. On February 25, 2022, Lewis signed with Benfica.
