= Cameron Clark (basketball) =

American basketball player (born 1991)

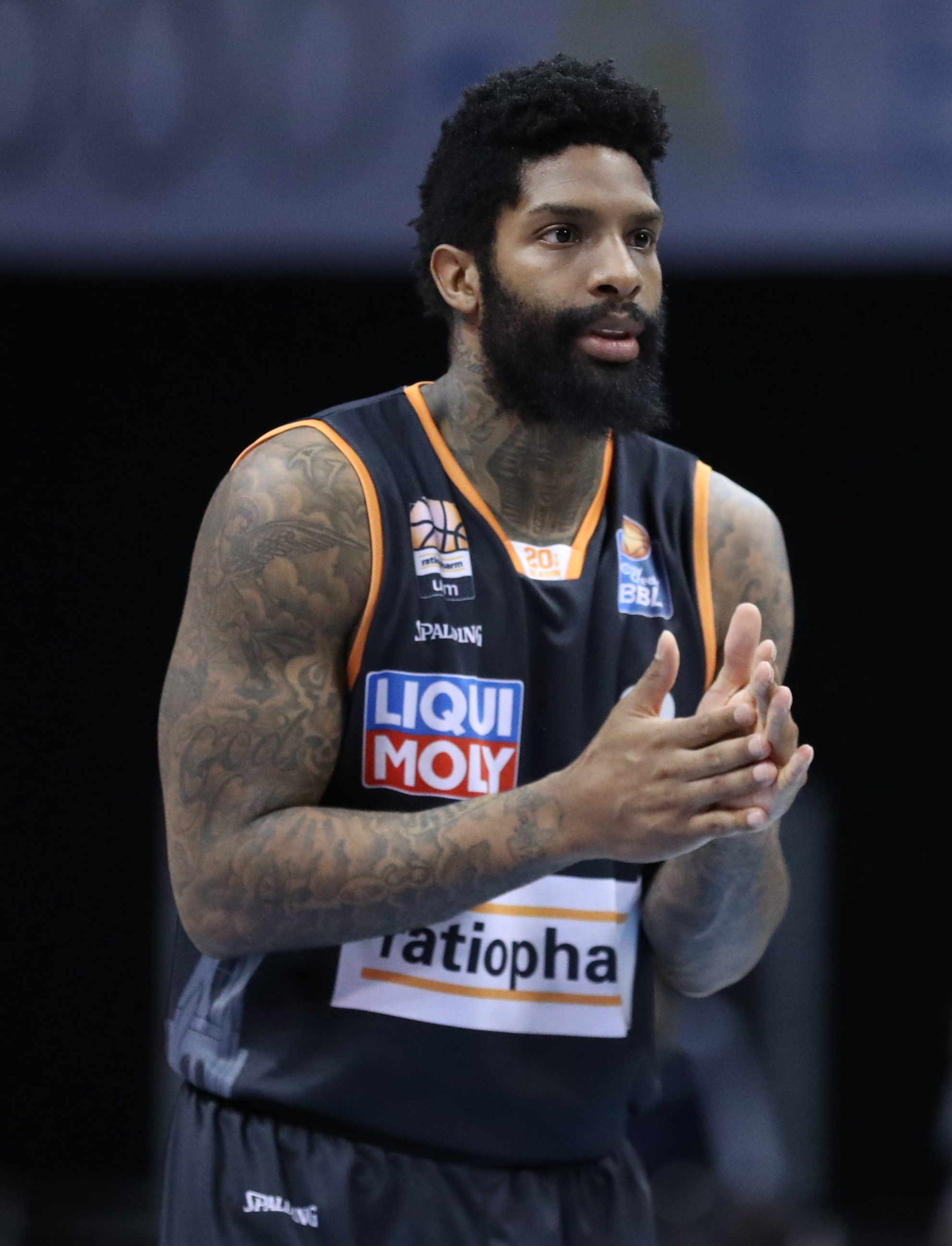
- Clark in June 2021

No. 23 – Converge FiberXers
- Position: Power forward
- League: PBA

Personal information
- Born: September 16, 1991 (age 35) Phoenix, Arizona, U.S.
- Listed height: 6 ft 7 in (2.01 m)
- Listed weight: 210 lb (95 kg)

Career information
- High school: Sherman (Sherman, Texas)
- College: Oklahoma (2010–2014)
- NBA draft: 2014: undrafted
- Playing career: 2014–present

Career history
- 2014–2015: Vanoli Cremona
- 2015–2016: Ironi Nahariya
- 2016–2017: Élan Chalon
- 2018–2019: Le Mans
- 2019–2020: Bahçeşehir Koleji
- 2021: ratiopharm Ulm
- 2021–2022: EWE Baskets Oldenburg
- 2022: NLEX Road Warriors
- 2022: Urunday Universitario
- 2023: San Miguel Beermen
- 2023: Cariduros de Fajardo
- 2023: Halcones de Xalapa
- 2024: Manama Club
- 2024: Kaohsiung 17LIVE Steelers
- 2024–2025: Hong Kong Eastern
- 2025: Atléticos de San Germán
- 2025: Gladiadores de Anzoátegui
- 2025–2026: Hong Kong Eastern
- 2026: Johor Southern Tigers
- 2026: Hong Kong Eastern
- 2026–present: Converge FiberXers

Career highlights
- LNB Pro A champion (2017); All-LNB Pro A First Team (2017); LNB Pro A scoring champion (2017); LNB All-Star (2017); All-FIBA Europe Cup First Team (2017); FIBA Europe Cup scoring champion (2017)

Cameron Miakhol Clark (born September 16, 1991) is an American professional basketball player for the Converge FiberXers of the Philippine Basketball Association (PBA).

== College career ==
In his senior season at Oklahoma, Clark averaged career-highs of 15.6 points and 5.5 rebounds per game and shot 46.2 percent from the floor, a team-high 43.5 percent from behind the arc, and 79.8 percent from the foul line. He helped lead Oklahoma to a 23–10 overall record, a second place mark in the Big 12 Conference with a 12–6 conference record, and a five seed in the NCAA Tournament. The 19th leading scorer all-time at Oklahoma with 1,284 points, Clark was named to the Third Team All-Big 12 after the season. He participated in the 2014 Reese's Division I College All-Star Game during Final Four weekend.

== Professional career ==
After going undrafted in the 2014 NBA draft, Clark joined the Los Angeles Clippers in the 2014 NBA Summer League.

On July 24, 2014, he inked his first pro contract with Vanoli Cremona of Serie A, the top Italian league.

Clark joined the Milwaukee Bucks for the 2015 Summer League. On September 7, 2015, Clark signed a one-year deal with Ironi Nahariya.

On July 17, 2017, Clark signed with Turkish club Gaziantep Basketbol. However, he missed much of the year with an injury.

Clark inked with the French club Le Mans Sarthe Basket on August 29, 2018.

On July 19, 2019, Clark signed a one-year contract with Bahçeşehir Koleji of the Turkish Basketbol Süper Ligi (BSL).

On February 19, 2021, he signed with ratiopharm Ulm of the Basketball Bundesliga.

On October 17, 2021, he signed with EWE Baskets Oldenburg of the Basketball Bundesliga (BBL).

On March 3, 2022, he signed with the NLEX Road Warriors of the Philippine Basketball Association (PBA) for the 2021 PBA Governors' Cup as a replacement for K. J. McDaniels.

In January 2023, Clark returned to the Philippines as he signed with the San Miguel Beermen of the PBA as the team's import for the 2023 PBA Governors' Cup.

On August 10, 2026, it was reported that Clark had returned to the Philippines to play for the Converge FiberXers of the PBA to replace Jamaal Franklin as the team's import for the 2026 PBA Governors' Cup.
