= Rayvonte Rice =

American basketball player (born 1992)

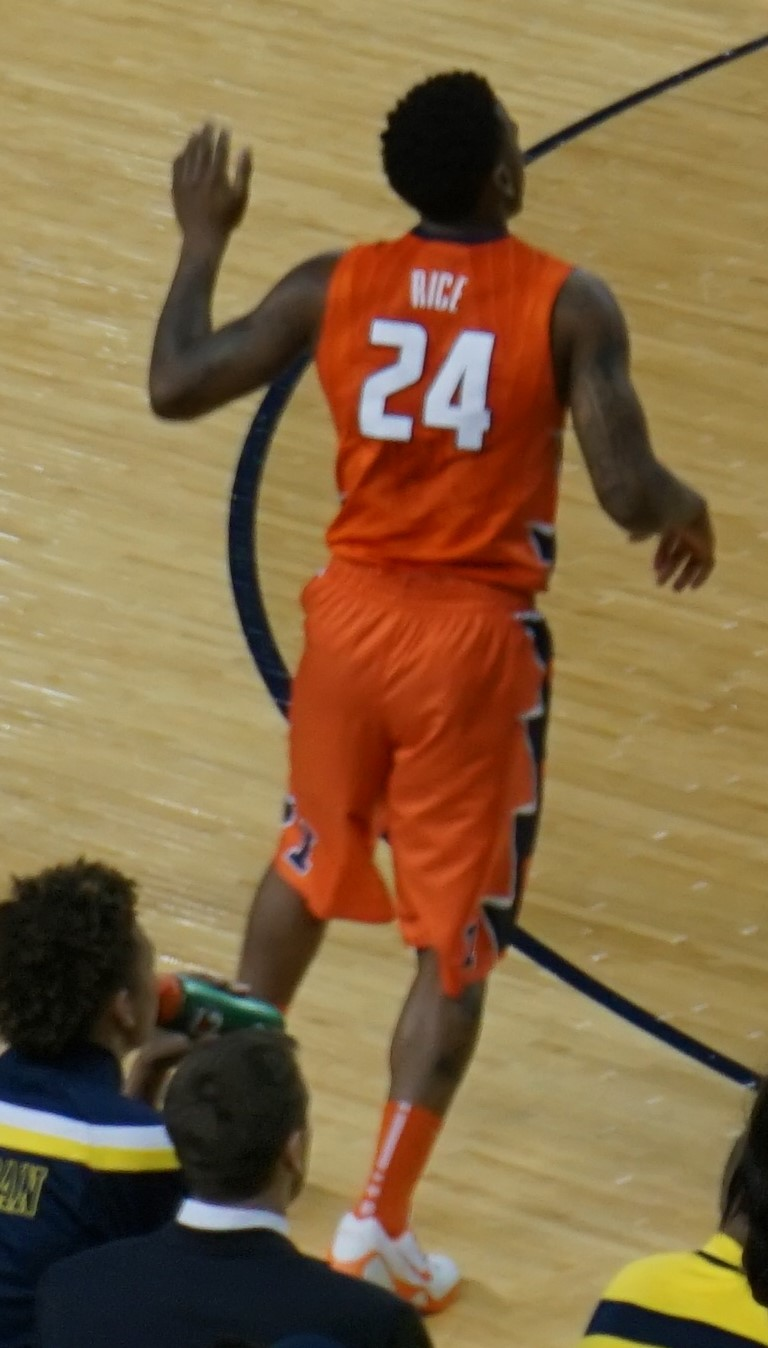
- Rice playing for Illinois in 2014

No. 25 – Kesatria Bengawan Solo
- Position: Shooting guard / point guard
- League: IBL

Personal information
- Born: July 14, 1992 (age 34) Champaign, Illinois, U.S.
- Listed height: 6 ft 4 in (1.93 m)
- Listed weight: 240 lb (109 kg)

Career information
- High school: Champaign Centennial
- College: Drake (2010–2012); Illinois (2013–2015)
- NBA draft: 2015: undrafted
- Playing career: 2015–present

Career history
- 2015–2016: Tezenis Verona
- 2017: Aix Maurienne Savoie
- 2017–2018: Basket Ravenna
- 2018: Petrochimi Bandar Imam
- 2018–2019: Soles de Mexicali
- 2019: Avtodor Saratov
- 2019–2020: Hapoel Eilat
- 2020: Ironi Ness Ziona
- 2020–2021: Kyoto Hannaryz
- 2021–2022: Ionikos Nikaias
- 2022: Salt Lake City Stars
- 2022: Indios de San Francisco de Macorís
- 2023: Brampton Honey Badgers
- 2023: Taichung Suns
- 2024: Kaohsiung 17LIVE Steelers
- 2024: Liaoning Flying Leopards
- 2024: Magnolia Chicken Timplados Hotshots
- 2024–2025: Guangdong Southern Tigers
- 2026–present: Kesatria Bengawan Solo

Career highlights
- Second-team All-MVC (2012); MVC All-Freshman Team (2011); MVC All-Newcomer Team (2011)

Rayvonte De'Tra Rice (born July 14, 1992) is an American professional basketball player who plays for the Kesatria Bengawan Solo of the Indonesian Basketball League. He is a guard from Champaign, Illinois who completed his college career at the University of Illinois Urbana-Champaign. He previously played at Drake University in Des Moines, Iowa from 2010 to 2012 and transferred after his sophomore season.

== High school ==
During his junior year season at Champaign Centennial High School, Rice led the Chargers to the 2009 3A IHSA Boys Basketball Championship with a 61–59 defeat over Oswego High School. During his senior season, Rice averaged 23.9 points, 6.4 rebounds, 2.9 steals and 1.8 assists and led his team back to the IHSA state tournament for a fourth-place finish. After his senior season in 2010, Rice came in second with 201 votes for Illinois Mr. Basketball behind Jereme Richmond. Ironically, Richmond committed to play at the University of Illinois while Rice was never offered a scholarship by then coach, Bruce Weber. Richmond only stayed at Illinois for one season, and Coach John Groce offered Rice a scholarship to transfer from Drake after his sophomore season.

Rice was named a member of the 2010 Illinois All-American Team as selected by the Associated Press, Chicago Tribune, Chicago Sun-Times, News-Gazette, and the Illinois Basketball Coaches Association. He was also named the 2010 News-Gazette All-State Player of the Year, the first from Champaign–Urbana metropolitan area since 1984.

Rice left Champaign Centennial High School as the all-time leading scorer in both school history and in Champaign-Urbana high school prep history with 1,810 career points.

"Man, I grew up watching guys like Dee [Brown], Deron [Williams] and Luther [Head]," Rice said. "I used to dream about putting on an Illini uniform, running out of that tunnel and hearing all the fans cheering for us. I never want to take this damn uniform off, it's a feeling I can't explain. I give all I can to this school, and I want the fans to remember the way I remember those guys; sometimes I still can't believe it, more like a dream, I love this school man you just don't know."

— Rayvonte Rice on transferring to Illinois

College recruiting
Name	Hometown	School	Height	Weight	Commit date
Rayvonte Rice; SG	Champaign, IL	Champaign Centennial High School	6 ft 4 in (1.93 m)	220 lb (100 kg)	Sep 11, 2009
Rayvonte Rice; SG	Recruit ratings: Scout: Rivals: (85)				
Overall recruit ranking: Scout: #35 (SG) Rivals: N/A ESPN: #89 (SG)
Note: In many cases, Scout, Rivals, 247Sports, On3, and ESPN may conflict in their listings of height and weight.; In these cases, the average was taken. ESPN grades are on a 100-point scale.; Sources: "Men's Basketball Recruiting". Scout.; "ESPN - Drake Bulldogs Basketball Recruiting 2010". ESPN.; "Scout.com Team Recruiting Rankings". Scout.; "2010 Team Ranking". Rivals.

== College career ==
=== Freshman ===
During his first year at Drake, Rice made an immediate impact, playing in 31 games and averaging 13.8 ppg and shooting an average of just over 40% from the field. For his contributions to his team, Rice was voted to the 2011 Missouri Valley Conference All-Freshman Team & the All-Newcomers Team.

=== Sophomore ===
Rice improved his second year at Drake averaging 16.8 ppg and shooting about 44% from the field. Rice was named to the 2012 Second-Team Missouri Valley Conference following the season.

After announcing his decision to transfer from Drake, Rice narrowed down his options between Illinois, Xavier, Memphis, and Marquette. Rice said of his decision to sign with Illinois, that John Groce had previously recruited him while Groce was still coach at Ohio University which contributed to his commitment.

Due to NCAA transfer rules, Rice was forced to sit out during the 2012-2013 season. The transfer regulations relegated Rice to attend only practices as a participant and home games at the State Farm Center as an observer. Rice has gained much notoriety for his transfer year as he made drastic changes to his workouts & diet, which resulted in him losing 45 pounds and cutting his overall body fat to 5%.

=== Junior ===
During the 2013-2014 season has been twice named Big Ten Player of the Week. As of January 3, 2014, Rice is leading the conference in scoring, averaging 19 ppg.

=== Senior ===
In the early season games, Rice won the Las Vegas Tournament MVP. During the 2014 year Rice improved his shooting 44% from three point line, improving from 29% the previous season. Ray had a major impact on the Braggin Rights game where he hit a step back game winning jumper as time expired. He showed his athleticism when he threw down a massive alley-oop dunk vs Purdue. Despite missing some games in the middle of the season due to injury, and having a lower average of minutes per game, he improved his field goal percentage by 4%, his three-point percentage by 14%, as previously noted, raised his free throw to 80%, and averaged more rebounds, steals, assists, and points in his senior campaign compared to his junior year. He ranked 5th in the big ten in scoring (unofficially since he missed games due to injury, and the Big Ten website accounts for players playing most of the games), and 9th in rebounding (also unofficially for the same reason). He won Co-Most Outstanding Player for the Illini tied with teammate Nnanna Egwu.

=== College statistics ===
Legend
GP	Games played	GS	Games started	MPG	Minutes per game
FG%	Field goal percentage	3P%	3-point field goal percentage	FT%	Free throw percentage
RPG	Rebounds per game	APG	Assists per game	SPG	Steals per game
BPG	Blocks per game	PPG	Points per game	**Bold**	Career high

Year	Team	GP	GS	MPG	FG%	3P%	FT%	RPG	APG	SPG	BPG	PPG
2010–11	Drake	31	30	30.1	40.2	29.5	69.6	4.8	1.6	1.4	0.8	13.8
2011–12	Drake	33	33	33.4	43.6	24.1	70.8	5.8	1.6	1.9	0.8	16.8
2012–13	Illinois	Did not play due to NCAA transfer regulations										
2013–14	Illinois	35	35	32.7	43.0	29.5	73.1	6.0	1.5	1.7	0.3	15.9
2014–15	Illinois	24	19	30.0	47.1	43.6	80.7	6.5	1.8	1.8	0.3	16.5

Updated: January 12, 2018

== Professional career ==
Rice signed his first professional contract with Tezenis Verona of the Italian Serie A2 Basket on July 29, 2015. Rice spent the 2017–18 season with Basket Ravenna Piero Manetti in Italy. He averaged 18.7 points and 6.3 rebounds per game in 30 games. On September 25, 2018, he signed with Petrochimi Bandar Imam BC of the Iranian Basketball Super League. In July 2019, Rice played with the Phoenix Suns during the 2019 NBA Summer League.

On September 4, 2019, Rice signed with Avtodor Saratov of the VTB United League. On December 25, 2019, Rice parted ways with Saratov to join Hapoel Eilat of the Israeli Premier League for the rest of the season. He signed with Kyoto Hannaryz of the Japanese B.League on July 15, 2020.

After training with AEK Athens for a period of time, Rice eventually signed with Ionikos Nikaias of the Greek Basket League, on December 10, 2021. On January 8, 2022, Rice mutually parted ways with the Greek club in order to pursue a G League contract. In only 2 games, he averaged 12.5 points and 3 rebounds, playing 21 minutes per contest.

On January 10, 2022, Rice was acquired by the Salt Lake City Stars.

In January 2023, Rice joined the Brampton Honey Badgers of the Canadian Elite Basketball League (CEBL) for the 2022–23 BCL Americas.

On February 10, 2023, Rice signed with the Taichung Suns of the T1 League.

On January 4, 2024, Rice signed with the Kaohsiung 17LIVE Steelers of the P. League+.

In June 2024, Rice signed with the Liaoning Flying Leopards of the Chinese Basketball Association (CBA) for the 2024 Basketball Champions League Asia.

On September 22, 2024, Rice signed with the Magnolia Chicken Timplados Hotshots of the Philippine Basketball Association (PBA) to replace injured Shabazz Muhammad as the team's import for the 2024 PBA Governors' Cup. On September 26, he was replaced by Jabari Bird.

On December 24, 2024, Rice signed with the Guangdong Southern Tigers of the Chinese Basketball Association (CBA). On January 4, 2025, his contract was terminated.

== Personal life ==
Rice has been quoted as saying he idolized former Fighting Illini basketball stars Dee Brown, Deron Williams, Luther Head, and Corey Bradford while growing up in Champaign.

While in high school, Rice was a dual-sport athlete who backed up his cousin Mikel Leshoure as running back for the Champaign Centennial Chargers. Leshoure went on to play football for the Fighting Illini and then was drafted in the 2nd round of the 2011 NFL draft by the Detroit Lions.
