= Taylor Braun =

American basketball player (born 1991)

No. 24 – Kaohsiung Steelers
- Position: Small forward
- League: P. League+

Personal information
- Born: July 6, 1991 (age 35)
- Listed height: 6 ft 7 in (2.01 m)
- Listed weight: 210 lb (95 kg)

Career information
- High school: Newberg (Newberg, Oregon)
- College: North Dakota State (2010–2014)
- NBA draft: 2014: undrafted
- Playing career: 2014–present

Career history
- 2014–2015: Okapi Aalstar
- 2015–2017: ratiopharm Ulm
- 2017–2018: Salt Lake City Stars
- 2018: V.L. Pesaro
- 2018–2019: Hapoel Be'er Sheva
- 2019–2020: Brisbane Bullets
- 2020: Hapoel Be'er Sheva
- 2020: Maccabi Haifa
- 2020–2021: Maccabi Ashdod
- 2021–2022: Kaohsiung Steelers
- 2022: Tainan TSG GhostHawks
- 2023: Taipei Fubon Braves
- 2024–2025: Windy City Bulls
- 2025–present: Kaohsiung Steelers

Career highlights
- AP Honorable Mention All-American (2014); Summit League Player of the Year (2014); 2× First-team All-Summit League (2012, 2014); Second-team All-Summit League (2013); Summit League tournament MVP (2014)
- Stats at Basketball Reference

Taylor Braun (born July 6, 1991) is an American professional basketball player for the Kaohsiung Steelers of the P. League+. He played college basketball for North Dakota State University before playing professionally in Belgium, Germany, Italy, Israel, and Taiwan. Standing at 6 ft 7 in (2.01 m), he primarily plays at the small forward position.

== College career ==
Braun attended Newberg High School in Newberg, Oregon, where he averaged 19 points, nine rebounds and four assists per game in his senior year. Braun led the Tigers to a 19–8 record and advanced to the state quarterfinals in Class 6A, the state's largest division. He was named Pacific 6 Conference Player of the Year, all-state first team, and finished third in the state Player of the Year voting.

Braun played college basketball for North Dakota State University's Bison, where he averaged 17.6 points, 5.4 rebounds, 3.7 assists and 1.5 steals per game, shooting 47.1 percent from the field and 41.4 percent from 3-point range in his senior year. Braun ranked fourth in free throws made (454), seventh in points (1,651), eighth in steals (153), ninth in three-pointers (125), and ninth in rebounds (671), becoming the first player in school history to rank among the career top 15 in points, rebounds and assists.

In his senior year at North Dakota, Braun was named was named AP Honorable Mention All-American, Summit League Player of the Year and 2014 Summit League tournament MVP.

== Professional career ==
=== Okapi Aalstar (2014–2015) ===
After going undrafted in 2014 NBA draft, Braun joined the Phoenix Suns for the 2014 NBA Summer League.

On July 20, 2014, Braun started his professional career with the Belgian team Okapi Aalstar, signing a one-year deal. On November 18, 2014, Braun recorded a career-high 27 points, shooting 11-of-14 from the field, along with six rebounds in a 92–83 win over the Bakken Bears. Braun helped Okapi Aalstar to reach the 2015 Belgian League Semifinals, where they eventually lost to Belfius Mons-Hainaut.

=== ratiopharm Ulm (2015–2017) ===
On June 30, 2015, Braun joined the Orlando Magic white team for the 2015 NBA Summer League.

On July 6, 2015, Braun signed with the German team ratiopharm Ulm for the 2015–16 season. On November 21, 2015, Braun recorded a season-high 24 points, shooting 10-of-14 from the field, along with six rebounds, three assists and three steals in a 95–67 win over BG Göttingen. Braun helped Ulm to reach the 2016 BBL Finals, where they eventually lost to Brose Bamberg.

On June 16, 2016, Braun signed a one-year contract extension with Ulm. Braun helped Ulm to reach the 2017 BBL Semifinals, as well as the 2017 EuroCup Top 16. In 53 games played during the 2016–17 season, Braun averaged 8 points, 3.7 rebounds and 1.6 assists per game.

=== Salt Lake City Stars (2017–2018) ===
On September 26, 2017, Braun was signed by the Utah Jazz of the NBA as a part of their training camp roster. Braun participated in two pre-season games for the Jazz before getting waived on October 7, 2017. On October 23, 2017, Braun joined the Salt Lake City Stars, The Utah Jazz G-League affiliate. In 45 games played for the Stars, Braun averaged 10.2 points, 5.4 rebounds, 2.9 assists and 1.5 steals per game.

=== Victoria Libertas Pesaro (2018) ===
On March 26, 2018, Braun signed with the Italian team VL Pesaro for the rest of the season. On April 8, 2018, Braun recorded a season-high 21 points, shooting 7-of-14 from the field, along with eight rebounds and five steals in an 80–72 win over Flexx Pistoia. He was subsequently named LBA Round 25 MVP.

=== Hapoel Be'er Sheva (2018–2019) ===
On July 16, 2018, Braun signed with the Israeli team Hapoel Be'er Sheva for the 2018–19 season. On October 15, 2018, Braun recorded a career-high 8 steals and a season-high 24 points, shooting 5-of-7 from 3-point range, along with seven rebounds, four assists in a 105–73 blowout win over Hapoel Tel Aviv. He was subsequently named Israeli League Round 2 MVP. In 28 games played for Be'er Sheva, he led the team in efficiency rating with 17.9 per game, to go with 14.9 points, 6 rebounds, 3.7 assists and 1.8 steals per game. Braun helped Be'er Sheva reach the 2019 Israeli League Playoffs, where they eventually were eliminated by Hapoel Jerusalem in the quarterfinals.

=== Brisbane Bullets (2019–2020) ===
On July 2, 2019, Braun signed with the Brisbane Bullets in Australia for the 2019–20 NBL season. He appeared in all 28 games for the Bullets, averaging 6.8 points, 2.6 rebounds and 2.3 assists per game.

=== Second stint with Hapoel Be'er Sheva (2020) ===
On February 27, 2020, Braun signed with Hapoel Be'er Sheva for the rest of the 2019–20 Israeli League season, returning to the team for a second stint.

=== Tainan TSG GhostHawks (2022) ===
On August 11, 2022, Braun signed with the Tainan TSG GhostHawks of the T1 League. On December 30, Tainan TSG GhostHawks terminated the contract relationship with Braun due to the knee injury.

== National team career ==
On February 20, 2018, Braun was named a member of the United States national team for the 2019 FIBA World Cup qualification. He helped the US to victories over Cuba and Puerto Rico.

== Career statistics ==
Legend
GP	Games played	MPG	Minutes per game	FG%	Field goal percentage
3P%	3-point field goal percentage	FT%	Free throw percentage	RPG	Rebounds per game
APG	Assists per game	SPG	Steals per game	BPG	Blocks per game
PPG	Points per game	**Bold**	Career high		Led the league

=== EuroCup ===
Year	Team	GP	GS	MPG	FG%	3P%	FT%	RPG	APG	SPG	BPG	PPG	PIR
2015–16	(Germany) ratiopharm Ulm	11	9	26.5	.480	.440	.900	3.9	2.6	0.8	0.1	8.3	10.8
2016–17	(Germany) ratiopharm Ulm	12	10	26.8	.465	.405	.667	3.3	1.8	1.0	0.1	10.4	10.6
2017–18	(United States) Salt Lake City Stars	45	-	32.7	.456	.389	.781	5.5	3.0	1.6	0.3	10.1	-
