= Femi Olujobi =

American basketball player (born 1996)

Olufemi Olujobi
No. 5 – Goyang Sono Skygunners
- Position: Power forward
- League: Korean Basketball League

Personal information
- Born: March 5, 1996 (age 30) Brentwood, New York, U.S.
- Listed height: 2.07 m (6 ft 9 in)
- Listed weight: 113 kg (249 lb)

Career information
- High school: Brentwood (Brentwood, New York)
- College: Oakland (2014–2016); North Carolina (2017–2018); DePaul (2018–2019)
- NBA draft: 2019: undrafted
- Playing career: 2019–present

Career history
- 2019–2020: Lietkabelis
- 2020–2021: MZT Skopje
- 2021–2022: ESSM Le Portel
- 2022–2024: Kaohsiung Steelers
- 2023: Indios de Mayagüez
- 2024–2025: Fighting Eagles Nagoya
- 2025: Taipei Fubon Braves
- 2025: Shimane Susanoo Magic
- 2025–2026: Altiri Chiba
- 2026: New Taipei Kings
- 2026–present: Goyang Sono Skygunners

Career highlights
- Macedonian League champion (2021); Macedonian Cup Winner (2021)

Olufemi Anthony Olujobi (born March 5, 1996) is an American professional basketball player for the Goyang Sono Skygunners of the Korean Basketball League (KBL). He played college basketball at Oakland Golden Grizzlies from 2014 to 2016, North Carolina A&T from 2017 to 2018 and DePaul Blue from 2018 to 2019.

== College career ==
As a senior at DePaul Blue in 2018-19 Olujobi averaged 12.7 points, 4.3 rebounds and 1.2 assists in 26.5 minutes in 36 appearances.

== Professional career ==
After graduating, in summer 2019, Olujobi signed with Lietkabelis of Lietuvos krepšinio lyga. On his debut against Keravnos, he played 4 minutes and achieved 2 rebounds and 2 assists. On February 12, 2020, he signed with Macedonian basketball champion MZT Skopje

On August 27, 2021, he has signed with ESSM Le Portel of the LNB Pro A.

On August 22, 2022, Olujobi signed with the Kaohsiung Steelers of the P. League+.

In June 2023, Olujobi joined the Indios de Mayagüez of the Baloncesto Superior Nacional (BSN), to replace Jeremy Tyler.

On September 7, 2023, Olujobi re-signed with the Kaohsiung Steelers.

On November 28, 2024, Olujobi signed with the Fighting Eagles Nagoya of the B.League.

On October 31, 2025, Olujobi signed with the Shimane Susanoo Magic of the B.League. On December 5, Olujobi signed with the Altiri Chiba of the B.League.

On January 16, 2026, Olujobi signed with the New Taipei Kings of the Taiwan Professional Basketball League (TPBL). On July 8, the New Taipei Kings announced that the contract with Olujobi was expired. On November 11, Olujobi signed with the Goyang Sono Skygunners of the Korean Basketball League (KBL).
