= Kaohsiung Steelers =

Taiwanese professional basketball team

- 2024–25 Kaohsiung Steelers season
- Leagues: P. League+
- Founded: 21 May 2021; 5 years ago
- History: Kaohsiung Steelers; 2021–2022; Kaohsiung 17LIVE Steelers; 2022–2024; Kaohsiung Steelers; 2024–2025
- Arena: Fengshan Arena
- Capacity: 5,300
- Location: Kaohsiung, Taiwan
- Team colors: Quenching White and Flaming Red
- President: Huang Che-Kuan
- General manager: Vacant
- Head coach: Chiu Ta-Tsung
- Ownership: Kaohsiung Sports & Entertainment
- Championships: 0
- Website: https://www.steelers.com.tw/

Kaohsiung Steelers (Chinese: 高雄鋼鐵人) was a professional basketball team based in Kaohsiung, Taiwan. They had been part of the P. League+ since the 2021–22 season. Established in 2021, the team plays in the Kaohsiung City Fengshan Stadium indoor arena.

On October 13, 2022, the team was renamed to Kaohsiung 17LIVE Steelers. On August 21, 2025, The Kaohsiung Steelers announced their withdrawal from the P.League+ and disband the team.

== Facilities ==
=== Home arenas ===
Arena	Location	Duration
Fengshan Arena	Kaohsiung City	2021–2025

== Roster ==
Kaohsiung Steelers roster
Players
Coaches

Pos.	No.	Nat.	Name	Ht.	Wt.	DOB (YYYY-MM-DD)	From
F	0	(Taiwan)	Chen Yu-An	1.92 m (6 ft 4 in)	90 kg (198 lb)	26 – 26 May 2000
G	3	(Taiwan)	Liu Cheng-Yan	1.73 m (5 ft 8 in)	74 kg (163 lb)	25 – 8 July 2001
G	4	(Taiwan)	Li Wei-Ting	1.81 m (5 ft 11 in)	84 kg (185 lb)	27 – 3 October 1999	SHU
F	7	(Taiwan)	Liu Yan-Ting	1.96 m (6 ft 5 in)	98 kg (216 lb)	26 – 17 January 2000
G	8	(Taiwan)	Lin Hsin-Hsiang	1.85 m (6 ft 1 in)	80 kg (176 lb)	25 – 9 April 2001	NTNU
G	13	(Taiwan)	Kao Wei-Lun	1.83 m (6 ft 0 in)	76 kg (168 lb)	24 – 15 December 2001	VNU
F	14	(United States)	Isaiah Todd (I)	2.06 m (6 ft 9 in)	99 kg (218 lb)	24 – 17 October 2001	NBA G League Ignite
F	23	(Taiwan)	Chen Fan Po-Yen	1.96 m (6 ft 5 in)	103 kg (227 lb)	26 – 24 January 2000	Chien Hsin Tech
F	24	(United States)	Taylor Braun (I)	2.01 m (6 ft 7 in)	95 kg (209 lb)	35 – 6 July 1991	North Dakota State
C	32	(Canada)	Jordy Tshimanga (I)	2.11 m (6 ft 11 in)	122 kg (269 lb)	29 – 4 November 1996	Dayton
G	42	(Taiwan)	Wang Kai-Yu	1.90 m (6 ft 3 in)	85 kg (187 lb)	24 – 11 January 2002
G	77	(Taiwan)	Chu Yuk-Qiun	1.83 m (6 ft 0 in)	80 kg (176 lb)	25 – 22 November 2000	NKNU

Head coach

- (Taiwan) Chiu Ta-Tsung

Assistant coach(es)

- (Taiwan) Han Yi-Pin
- (Taiwan) Liu Wen-He

Strength & conditioning coach(es)

- (Taiwan) Chiu Po-Chang

Athletic trainer(s)

- (Taiwan) Bao Chun-Hsin
- (Taiwan) Huang Yu-Chun

Legend

- (C) Team captain
- (I) Import player
- (FS) Foreign student player
- (HP) Heritage player
- (FA) Free agent
- (DP) Unsigned draft pick
- (AI) EASL Asian import
- (S) Suspended
- Injured

- Roster
Updated: January 1, 2026

== Season-by-season record ==
P. LEAGUE+
Season	Coach	Regular season				Postseason			
Season	Coach	Won	Lost	Win %	Finish	Won	Lost	Win %	Result
2021–22	DeMarcus Berry	9	20	.310	5th	Did not qualify.			
2021–22	Hung Chi-Chao	9	20	.310	5th	Did not qualify.			
2021–22	Slavoljub Gorunovic	9	20	.310	5th	Did not qualify.			
2022–23	Slavoljub Gorunovic	17	23	.425	5th	Did not qualify.			
2022–23	Hung Chi-Chao	17	23	.425	5th	Did not qualify.			
2022–23	Dean Murray	17	23	.425	5th	Did not qualify.			
2022–23	Cheng Chih-Lung	17	23	.425	5th	Did not qualify.			
2023–24	Chiu Ta-Tsung	9	31	.225	6th	Did not qualify.			
2024–25	Chiu Ta-Tsung	2	22	.083	4th	Did not qualify.			
Totals		37	96	.278	-	0	0	–	0 Playoff Appearances
