= 2022–23 PLG season =

- League: P. League+
- Sport: Basketball
- Duration: November 5, 2022 – May 14, 2023; May 19, 2023 – May 27, 2023 (playoffs); June 3, 2023 – June 14, 2023 (finals)
- Games: 40
- Teams: 6
- TV partner(s): FTV One, MOMOTV

Draft
- Top draft pick: Chang Chen-Ya
- Picked by: Taoyuan Pilots

Regular season
- Top seed: New Taipei Kings
- Season MVP: Yang Chin-Min (Kings)
- Top scorer: Mike Singletary (Braves)

Playoffs

Finals
- Champions: Taipei Fubon Braves
- Runners-up: New Taipei Kings
- Finals MVP: Chris Johnson

P. League+ seasons
- ← 2021–22 2023–24 →

The 2022–23 P. League+ season was the third season of the P. League+ (PLG). The regular season began on November 5, 2022, and ended on May 14, 2023. The playoffs started on May 19, 2023, and ended on June 14, 2023, after the Taipei Fubon Braves clinched their third consecutive champion.

== Transactions ==
=== Retirement ===
- On April 25, 2022, Elliot Tan announced his retirement from professional basketball.
- On December 25, 2022, Anthony Tucker announced his retirement from professional basketball.
- On January 5, 2023, Oscar Lin joined Kaohsiung 17LIVE Steelers as individual skills coach and interpreter, ending his playing career.

=== Coaching changes ===
Coaching changes
Team	2021–22 season	2022–23 season
Off-season
Taoyuan Pilots	Yen Hsing-Shu (interim)	Iurgi Caminos
Kaohsiung Steelers	Slavoljub Gorunovic (interim)	Slavoljub Gorunovic
Kaohsiung 17LIVE Steelers	Slavoljub Gorunovic	Hung Chi-Chao (interim)
In-season
Kaohsiung 17LIVE Steelers	Hung Chi-Chao (interim)	Dean Murray
Kaohsiung 17LIVE Steelers	Dean Murray	Hung Chi-Chao (interim)
Kaohsiung 17LIVE Steelers	Hung Chi-Chao (interim)	Cheng Chih-Lung
Formosa Taishin Dreamers	Kyle Julius	Lai Po-Lin

==== Off-season ====
- On July 1, 2022, the Taoyuan Pilots hired Iurgi Caminos as their new head coach.
- On July 19, 2022, the Kaohsiung Steelers head assistant coach, Slavoljub Gorunovic was promoted to the head coach.
- On October 28, 2022, the Kaohsiung 17LIVE Steelers fired head coach Slavoljub Gorunovic and named Hung Chi-Chao as their interim head coach.

==== In-season ====
- On November 10, 2022, the Kaohsiung 17LIVE Steelers hired Dean Murray as their new head coach.
- On December 29, 2022, the Kaohsiung 17LIVE Steelers fired head coach Dean Murray and named Hung Chi-Chao as their interim head coach.
- On January 7, 2023, the Kaohsiung 17LIVE Steelers named Cheng Chih-Lung as their new head coach.
- On January 10, 2023, the Formosa Taishin Dreamers' head coach Kyle Julius resigned, and the team named assistant coach Lai Po-Lin as their new head coach.

== Imports, foreign students, and heritage players ==
Club	Imports	Foreign students	Heritage players
Formosa Taishin Dreamers	(United States) ~~Nick Faust~~ (United States) ~~Malcolm Miller~~ (United States) ~~Sir'Dominic Pointer~~ (United States) Brandon Gilbeck (Turkey) İlkan Karaman (United States) Chris McCullough	—N/a	(United States) Kenneth Chien
Hsinchu JKO Lioneers	(Canada) ~~Sim Bhullar~~ (United States) ~~Terrico White~~ (United States) Will Artino (Canada) Anthony Bennett (United States) Jeremy Tyler	(Nigeria) Ifeanyi Eboka	—N/a
Kaohsiung 17LIVE Steelers	(Serbia) ~~Andrija Bojić~~ (United States) ~~Manny Harris~~ (United States) ~~Aaron Harrison~~ (United States) ~~Vance Jackson~~ (United States) ~~Terrence Jones~~ (Ukraine) ~~Viacheslav Kravtsov~~ (United States) Wendell Lewis (United States) Gokul Natesan (United States) Femi Olujobi	(United States) Jay West	(United States) ~~Matthew Yang~~ (United States) Jeremy Lin
New Taipei Kings	(United States) ~~Jamel Artis~~ (United States) ~~Austin Daye~~ (United States) ~~DaJuan Summers~~ (United States) Kenny Manigault (United States) Byron Mullens	(Senegal) Omar Niang	(United States) Joseph Lin
Taipei Fubon Braves	(United States) ~~Perry Jones~~ (United States) Chris Johnson (United States) Mike Singletary (Ukraine) Ihor Zaytsev	(Saint Vincent and the Grenadines) Brendon Smart	(France) Steven Guinchard
Taoyuan Pauian Pilots	(Philippines) ~~Ricci Rivero~~ (United States) Jeff Ayres (Palestine) Sani Sakakini (United States) Jason Washburn	(Senegal) Amdy Dieng	—N/a

Note 1: "Heritage player" refers to a player who is of Taiwanese descent but does not meet the FIBA eligibility rules to be local.

Note 2: Team can either register two heritage players, or one foreign student and one heritage player.

== Interleague play ==
The interleague play, an interleague tournament which was played by teams from P. League+, T1 League, and Super Basketball League, began on September 17, 2022, and ended on September 27. The Lioneers competed individually, while the other five teams participated as a united team named "PLG Rising Stars".

== Preseason ==
The preseason began on October 8, 2022, and ended on October 10.

== Regular season ==
The regular season began on November 5, 2022, and ended on May 14, 2023.

Pos	Team	W	L	PCT	GB	Qualification
1	New Taipei Kings	27	13	.675	—	Playoffs
2	Taipei Fubon Braves	25	15	.625	2	Playoffs
3	Taoyuan Pauian Pilots	19	21	.475	8	Playoffs
4	Formosa Taishin Dreamers	19	21	.475	8	Playoffs
5	Kaohsiung 17LIVE Steelers	17	23	.425	10	
6	Hsinchu JKO Lioneers	13	27	.325	14	

Updated to match(es) played on May 14, 2023. Source: P.League+

=== Results ===
Home \ Away	FTD	HJL	KHS	NTK	TFB	TPP
Dreamers		123–99	84–76	89–101	75–108	88–77
Dreamers		111–93	117–94	90–99	87–90	86–81
Dreamers		116–103	102–91	73–90	96–100	74–87
Dreamers		89–85	87–97	92–79	107–89	89–75
Lioneers	82–77		89–83	85–101	108–104	80–94
Lioneers	102–97		109–85	107–106	94–92	90–105
Lioneers	87–80		89–86	85–102	87–114	92–106
Lioneers	94–100		82–95	110–95	88–94	78–89
Steelers	105–88	101–102		115–95	119–125	78–108
Steelers	101–106	76–85		89–100	103–102	97–110
Steelers	95–80	112–103		102–109	95–101	99–84
Steelers	89–92	113–88		116–110	106–105	80–60
Kings	82–102	113–78	109–86		104–89	104–91
Kings	111–105	73–98	101–88		95–83	93–88
Kings	117–89	103–91	85–92		95–106	89–81
Kings	105–110	104–95	104–100		68–89	90–87
Braves	94–97	102–94	117–114	99–103		86–74
Braves	90–75	114–98	114–80	101–106		86–84
Braves	91–87	131–101	106–82	111–109		86–95
Braves	100–96	112–99	103–120	90–97		97–93
Pilots	84–80	102–79	100–83	88–74	90–85	
Pilots	93–76	103–60	63–93	73–77	78–80	
Pilots	77–85	88–70	86–100	95–98	83–80	
Pilots	97–84	95–81	93–101	89–90	74–77	

Source: / P.League+
Legend: Blue = home team win; Yellow = draw; Red = away team win.
For upcoming matches, an "a" indicates there is an article about the rivalry between the two participants.
Matches with lighter background shading were decided after overtime.

=== Postponed games due to COVID-19 ===
- The January 14 game between the Taipei Fubon Braves and the Kaohsiung 17LIVE Steelers was postponed due to the Steelers not having the required minimum players available.
- The January 17 game between the Kaohsiung 17LIVE Steelers and the New Taipei Kings was postponed due to the Steelers not having the required minimum players available.

=== Postponed games due to other reasons ===
- The May 7 game between the Hsinchu JKO Lioneers and the New Taipei Kings was postponed due to a scheduling issue of the Xinzhuang Gymnasium.

== Playoffs ==
The playoffs were scheduled to begin on May 19 and end on June 16.

=== Bracket ===
Playoffs
1	**Kings**	3
4	Dreamers	1
2	**Braves**	3
3	Pilots	0

Finals
1	Kings	2
2	**Braves**	4

Bold: Series winner
Italic: Team with home-court advantage

=== Semifinals ===
The semifinals is a best-of-five series, with the higher seeded team hosting Game 1, 2, and 5, if necessary.

Team 1	Series	Team 2	Game 1	Game 2	Game 3	Game 4	Game 5
(1) New Taipei Kings	3–1	(4) Formosa Taishin Dreamers	103-84	102-83	95-115	108-100	NA
(2) Taipei Fubon Braves	3–0	(3) Taoyuan Pauian Pilots	94-76	83-74	101-89	NA	NA

=== Finals ===
The finals is a best-of-seven series, with the higher seeded team hosting Game 1, 2, and 5 and 7, if necessary.

Team 1	Series	Team 2	Game 1	Game 2	Game 3	Game 4	Game 5	Game 6	Game 7
(1) New Taipei Kings	2-4	(2) Taipei Fubon Braves	**86**-72	83-**87**	91-**97**	**107**-97	105-**111**	108-**114**	NA

== Statistics ==
=== Individual statistic leaders ===
Category	Player	Team(s)	Statistic
Points per game	Mike Singletary	Taipei Fubon Braves	23.29
Rebounds per game	Byron Mullens	New Taipei Kings	15.76
Assists per game	Kenny Manigault	New Taipei Kings	6.03
Steals per game	Kenny Manigault	New Taipei Kings	3.52
Blocks per game	Brandon Gilbeck	Formosa Taishin Dreamers	2.95
2P%	Quincy Davis	New Taipei Kings	66%
3P%	Ihor Zaytsev	Taipei Fubon Braves	43%
FT%	Jeff Ayres	Taoyuan Pauian Pilots	85%

=== Individual game highs ===
Category	Player	Team	Statistic
Points	Jeremy Lin	Kaohsiung 17LIVE Steelers	50
Rebounds	Will Artino	Hsinchu JKO Lioneers	28
Rebounds	Chris Johnson	Taipei Fubon Braves	28
Assists	Jeremy Lin	Kaohsiung 17LIVE Steelers	16
Steals	Kenny Manigault	New Taipei Kings	10
Blocks	Brandon Gilbeck	Formosa Taishin Dreamers	6
Blocks	Chris Johnson	Taipei Fubon Braves	6
Turnovers	Terrence Jones	Kaohsiung 17LIVE Steelers	10
Turnovers	Kenny Manigault	New Taipei Kings	10

=== Team statistic leaders ===
Category	Team	Statistic
Points per game	Taipei Fubon Braves	98.58
Rebounds per game	New Taipei Kings	54.83
Assists per game	New Taipei Kings	23.68
Steals per game	New Taipei Kings	11.00
Blocks per game	Formosa Taishin Dreamers	5.85
Turnovers per game	Hsinchu JKO Lioneers	16.85
Fouls per game	Taoyuan Pauian Pilots	21.98
2P%	Kaohsiung 17LIVE Steelers	49.44%
3P%	New Taipei Kings	32.81%
FT%	Taipei Fubon Braves	73.53%

== Awards ==
=== Yearly awards ===
2022–23 PLG awards
Award		Recipient(s)	ref
Most Valuable Player		Yang Chin-Min (New Taipei Kings)	
Import of the Year		Byron Mullens (New Taipei Kings)	
6th Man of the Year		Lin Chun-Chi (Formosa Taishin Dreamers)	
Rookie of the Year		Pai Yao-Cheng (Taoyuan Pauian Pilots)	
Defensive Player of the Year		Brandon Gilbeck (Formosa Taishin Dreamers)	
GM of the Year		Chen Hsin-An (Taoyuan Pauian Pilots)	
Gold Whistle Award		Lai Jian-Zhong	
Coach of the Year		Ryan Marchand (New Taipei Kings)	
Most Improved Player		Tseng Hsiang-Chun (Taipei Fubon Braves)	
Best Home Court		Hsinchu JKO Lioneers	
Best Dressed of the Year		Joseph Lin (New Taipei Kings)	
Mr. Popular		Lin Chih-Chieh (Taipei Fubon Braves)	
PLG Cheerleader Squad of the Year		Fubon Angels (Taipei Fubon Braves)	
Highlight of the Year	Best Key Play	Lin Chih-Chieh (Taipei Fubon Braves)	
Highlight of the Year	Best Dunk	Chris Johnson (Taipei Fubon Braves)	
Highlight of the Year	Best Assist	Lin Chih-Chieh (Taipei Fubon Braves)	
Highlight of the Year	Best Circus Shot	Chris Johnson (Taipei Fubon Braves)	
Highlight of the Year	Best Block	Lin Chih-Chieh (Taipei Fubon Braves)	
Highlight of the Year	Best Ball Control	Jeremy Lin (Kaohsiung 17LIVE Steelers)	

- All-PLG Team:
  - Tseng Hsiang-Chun, Taipei Fubon Braves
  - Yang Chin-Min, New Taipei Kings
  - Byron Mullens, New Taipei Kings
  - Joseph Lin, New Taipei Kings
  - Lu Chun-Hsiang, Taoyuan Pauian Pilots
- All-PLG Second Team:
  - Quincy Davis, New Taipei Kings
  - Shih Chin-Yao, Taoyuan Pauian Pilots
  - Kenny Manigault, New Taipei Kings
  - Kao Kuo-Hao, Hsinchu JKO Lioneers
  - Lin Chun-Chi, Formosa Taishin Dreamers

- All-Defensive Team:
  - Tseng Hsiang-Chun, Taipei Fubon Braves
  - Hsiao Shun-Yi, Hsinchu JKO Lioneers
  - Brandon Gilbeck, Formosa Taishin Dreamers
  - Lu Chun-Hsiang, Taoyuan Pauian Pilots
  - Kao Kuo-Hao, Hsinchu JKO Lioneers

==== Statistical awards ====
2022–23 PLG statistical awards
Award	Recipient(s)	ref
Points Leader	Mike Singletary (Taipei Fubon Braves)	
Rebounds Leader	Byron Mullens (New Taipei Kings)	
Assists Leader	Jeremy Lin (Kaohsiung 17LIVE Steelers)	
Blocks Leader	Brandon Gilbeck (Formosa Taishin Dreamers)	
Steals Leader	Kenny Manigault (New Taipei Kings)	

==== Finals ====
2023 PLG Finals awards
Award	Recipient(s)	ref
Champion	Taipei Fubon Braves	
Finals MVP	Chris Johnson	

=== Players of the Week ===
Week	Recipient	Ref
1	Mike Singletary (Taipei Fubon Braves) (1/1)	
2	Chris Johnson (Taipei Fubon Braves) (1/1)	
3	Kao Kuo-Hao (Hsinchu JKO Lioneers) (1/2)	
4	Huang Hung-Han (Taoyuan Pauian Pilots) (1/1)	
5	Lu Chun-Hsiang (Taoyuan Pauian Pilots) (1/2)	
6	Pai Yao-Cheng (Taoyuan Pauian Pilots) (1/1)	
7	Tseng Hsiang-Chun (Taipei Fubon Braves) (1/1)	
8	Lin Chun-Chi (Formosa Taishin Dreamers) (1/1)	
9	Kao Kuo-Hao (Hsinchu JKO Lioneers) (2/2)	
10	Joseph Lin (New Taipei Kings) (1/1)	
11	Anthony Bennett (Hsinchu JKO Lioneers) (1/1)	
13	Ihor Zaytsev (Taipei Fubon Braves) (1/1)	
14	Lu Chun-Hsiang (Taoyuan Pauian Pilots) (2/2)	
15	Jeremy Lin (Kaohsiung 17LIVE Steelers) (1/9)	
16	Wu Yung-Sheng (Formosa Taishin Dreamers) (1/1)	
17	Lee Te-Wei (Formosa Taishin Dreamers) (1/1)	
18	Ilkan Karaman (Formosa Taishin Dreamers) (1/1)	
19	Kenny Manigault (New Taipei Kings) (1/1)	
20	Jeremy Lin (Kaohsiung 17LIVE Steelers) (2/9)	
21	Brandon Gilbeck (Formosa Taishin Dreamers) (1/1)	
22	Jeremy Lin (Kaohsiung 17LIVE Steelers) (3/9)	
23	Jeremy Lin (Kaohsiung 17LIVE Steelers) (4/9)	
24	Jeremy Lin (Kaohsiung 17LIVE Steelers) (5/9)	
25	Jeremy Lin (Kaohsiung 17LIVE Steelers) (6/9)	
26	Jeremy Lin (Kaohsiung 17LIVE Steelers) (7/9)	
27	Jeremy Lin (Kaohsiung 17LIVE Steelers) (8/9)	
28	Jeremy Lin (Kaohsiung 17LIVE Steelers) (9/9)	

=== Players of the Month ===
Month	Recipient	Ref
November	Byron Mullens (New Taipei Kings) (1/2)	
December	Lu Chun-Hsiang (Taoyuan Pauian Pilots) (1/2)	
January	Lu Chun-Hsiang (Taoyuan Pauian Pilots) (2/2)	
February	Byron Mullens (New Taipei Kings) (2/2)	
March	Jeremy Lin (Kaohsiung 17LIVE Steelers) (1/3)	
April	Jeremy Lin (Kaohsiung 17LIVE Steelers) (2/3)	
May	Jeremy Lin (Kaohsiung 17LIVE Steelers) (3/3)	

== Media ==
The games were aired on television via FTV One and MOMOTV, and broadcast online on the YouTube official channel, 4GTV and Line TV.

== Notable occurrences ==
- The P. League+ officially introduced "PLG" as its abbreviation.
- The PLG schedule expanded from 30 games per team to 40.
- The Taoyuan Pilots was renamed to Taoyuan Pauian Pilots.
- The Kaohsiung Steelers was renamed to Kaohsiung 17LIVE Steelers.
