= 2023 PLG playoffs =

Professional basketball tournament to determine the 2023 champion of the PLG

Tournament details
- Dates: May 19–June 14, 2023
- Season: 2022–23
- Teams: 4

Final positions
- Champions: Taipei Fubon Braves (3rd title)
- Runner-up: New Taipei Kings

The 2023 PLG playoffs is the postseason tournament of the 2022–23 PLG season. The playoffs started on May 19 and ended on June 14.

== Format ==
The top four seed qualify the playoffs. All seeds will play the best-of-five playoffs series, which is in a 2-2-1 format. The winners advance and play in the best-of-seven finals series, which is in a 2-2-1-1-1 format. The seeding is based on each team's regular season record. Home court advantage goes to the higher seed for both series.

== Playoff qualifying ==
On March 28, 2023, the New Taipei Kings became the first team to clinch a playoff spot. On April 30, the New Taipei Kings clinched the regular season title.

Seed	Team	Record	Clinched	
Seed	Team	Record	Playoff berth	Best record in PLG
1	New Taipei Kings	27–13	March 28	April 30
2	Taipei Fubon Braves	25–15	April 15	—
3	Taoyuan Pauian Pilots	19–21	May 5	—
4	Formosa Taishin Dreamers	19–21	May 14	—

== Bracket ==
Playoffs
1	Kings	3
4	Dreamers	1
2	Braves	3
3	Pilots	0

Finals
1	Kings	2
2	Braves	4

Bold Series winner
Italic Team with home-court advantage

== Playoffs: (1) New Taipei Kings vs. (4) Formosa Taishin Dreamers ==
May 19
7:00pm

boxscore

Formosa Taishin Dreamers 84, New Taipei Kings 103
Scoring by quarter: 15–31, 22–23, 25–36, 22–13
Pts: Chris McCullough 17; Rebs: Chris McCullough 22; Asts: Chris McCullough 4	Pts: Kenny Manigault 23; Rebs: Kenny Manigault 11; Asts: Joseph Lin 7
Kings leads series, 1–0

Xinzhuang Gymnasium, New Taipei City
Attendance: 5,538
Referees: Chen Hung-Ming, Chang Lu-Yueh, Tsung Hsiu-Hui

May 21
5:00pm

boxscore

Formosa Taishin Dreamers 83, New Taipei Kings 102
Scoring by quarter: 24–28, 23–25, 19–22, 17–24
Pts: İlkan Karaman 29; Rebs: İlkan Karaman 9 Asts: Lin Chun-Chi 10	Pts: Kenny Manigault 35; Rebs: Kenny Manigault 11; Asts: Kenny Manigault 4
Kings leads series, 2–0

Xinzhuang Gymnasium, New Taipei City
Attendance: 6,360
Referees: Lai Jian-Zhong, Yeh Chun-Hung, Yu Hao-Ping

May 25
7:00pm

boxscore

New Taipei Kings 95, Formosa Taishin Dreamers 115
Scoring by quarter: 18–39, 29–26, 22–25, 26–25
Pts: Yang Chin-Min 24; Rebs: Kenny Manigault 9 Asts: Kenny Manigault 5	Pts: İlkan Karaman 30; Rebs: İlkan Karaman 19; Asts: İlkan Karaman 6
Kings leads series, 2–1

Intercontinental Basketball Stadium, Taichung City
Attendance: 3,000
Referees: Hsieh Wen-Wei, Mei Ming-Sheng, Sung Ming-Lu

May 27
5:00pm

boxscore

New Taipei Kings 108, Formosa Taishin Dreamers 100
Scoring by quarter: 30–16, 30–27, 12–28, 36–29
Pts: Yang Chin-Min 25; Rebs: Byron Mullens 10; Asts: Kenny Manigault 9	Pts: İlkan Karaman 31; Rebs: Brandon Gilbeck 12; Asts: Lin Chun-Chi 7
Kings wins series, 3–1

Intercontinental Basketball Stadium, Taichung City
Attendance: 3,000
Referees: Pang Yun-Han, Hong Yung-Yu, Huang Chen-Feng

Regular-season series
Kings won 5–3 in the regular-season series

November 19, 2022

Boxscore

New Taipei Kings 101, Formosa Taishin Dreamers 89

Intercontinental Basketball Stadium, Taichung City

November 27, 2022

Boxscore

Formosa Taishin Dreamers 102, New Taipei Kings 82

Xinzhuang Gymnasium, New Taipei City

December 25, 2022

Boxscore

New Taipei Kings 99, Formosa Taishin Dreamers 90

Intercontinental Basketball Stadium, Taichung City

January 29, 2023

Boxscore

New Taipei Kings 90, Formosa Taishin Dreamers 73

Intercontinental Basketball Stadium, Taichung City

March 7, 2023

Boxscore

Formosa Taishin Dreamers 105, New Taipei Kings 111

Xinzhuang Gymnasium, New Taipei City

March 11, 2023

Boxscore

Formosa Taishin Dreamers 89, New Taipei Kings 117

Xinzhuang Gymnasium, New Taipei City

March 24, 2023

Boxscore

New Taipei Kings 79, Formosa Taishin Dreamers 92

Intercontinental Basketball Stadium, Taichung City

May 6, 2023

Boxscore

Formosa Taishin Dreamers 110, New Taipei Kings 105

Xinzhuang Gymnasium, New Taipei City

== Playoffs: (2) Taipei Fubon Braves vs. (3) Taoyuan Pauian Pilots ==
May 20
5:00pm

boxscore

Taoyuan Pauian Pilots 76, Taipei Fubon Braves 94
Scoring by quarter: 21–23, 14–32, 19–14, 22–25
Pts: Jeff Ayres 24; Rebs: Jeff Ayres 13; Asts: Pai Yao-Cheng 6	Pts: Chang T., Singletary 16 each Rebs: Singletary, Zaytsev 10 each Asts: Ihor Zaytsev 6
Braves leads series, 1–0

Taipei Heping Basketball Gymnasium, Taipei City
Attendance: 6,825
Referees: Pang Yun-Han, Hong Yung-Yu, Huang Hsiao-Han

May 22
7:00pm

boxscore

Taoyuan Pauian Pilots 74, Taipei Fubon Braves 83
Scoring by quarter: 23–19, 12–21, 28–19, 11–24
Pts: Jeff Ayres 17; Rebs: Jeff Ayres 17; Asts: Li, Pai 5 each	Pts: Mike Singletary 28; Rebs: Mike Singletary 8 Asts: Ihor Zaytsev 5
Braves leads series, 2–0

Taipei Heping Basketball Gymnasium, Taipei City
Attendance: 6,168
Referees: Chen Chao-Hung, Huang Chen-Feng, Yang Shih-Hsian

May 26
7:00pm

boxscore

Taipei Fubon Braves 101, Taoyuan Pauian Pilots 89
Scoring by quarter: 26–30, 26–19, 26–22, 23–18
Pts: Lin Chih-chieh 29; Rebs: Ihor Zaytsev 12; Asts: Ihor Zaytsev 5	Pts: Jason Washburn 33; Rebs: Jeff Ayres 9 Asts: Pai Yao-Cheng 10
Braves wins series, 3–0

Taoyuan Arena, Taoyuan City
Attendance: 5,155
Referees: Chen Hung-Ming, Yeh Chun-Hung, Tsung Hsiu-Hui

Regular-season series
Braves won 5–3 in the regular-season series

December 25, 2022

Boxscore

Taipei Fubon Braves 85, Taoyuan Pauian Pilots 90

Taoyuan Arena, Taoyuan City

January 28, 2023

Boxscore

Taoyuan Pauian Pilots 74, Taipei Fubon Braves 86

Taipei Heping Basketball Gymnasium, Taipei City

February 11, 2023

Boxscore

Taipei Fubon Braves 80, Taoyuan Pauian Pilots 78

Taoyuan Arena, Taoyuan City

February 19, 2023

Boxscore

Taoyuan Pauian Pilots 84, Taipei Fubon Braves 86

Taipei Heping Basketball Gymnasium, Taipei City

February 26, 2023

Boxscore

Taipei Fubon Braves 80, Taoyuan Pauian Pilots 83

Taoyuan Arena, Taoyuan City

April 4, 2023

Boxscore

Taipei Fubon Braves 77, Taoyuan Pauian Pilots 74

Taoyuan Arena, Taoyuan City

April 23, 2023

Boxscore

Taoyuan Pauian Pilots 95, Taipei Fubon Braves 86

Taipei Heping Basketball Gymnasium, Taipei City

May 7, 2023

Boxscore

Taoyuan Pauian Pilots 93, Taipei Fubon Braves 97

Taipei Heping Basketball Gymnasium, Taipei City

== PLG finals: (1) New Taipei Kings vs. (2) Taipei Fubon Braves ==
June 3
5:00pm

boxscore

Taipei Fubon Braves 72, New Taipei Kings 86
Scoring by quarter: 18–21, 21–22, 17–25, 16–18
Pts: Ihor Zaytsev 20; Rebs: Mike Singletary 12; Asts: Chang T., Jian, Singletary 3 each	Pts: Yang Chin-Min 24; Rebs: Byron Mullens 20; Asts: J. Lin, Manigault 5 each
Kings leads series, 1–0

Xinzhuang Gymnasium, New Taipei City
Attendance: 6,540
Referees: Lai Jian-Zhong, Chen Chao-Hung, Yang Shih-Hsien

June 5
7:00pm

boxscore

Taipei Fubon Braves 87, New Taipei Kings 83
Scoring by quarter: 16–23, 32–24, 18–10, 20–26
Pts: Ihor Zaytsev 20; Rebs: Johnson, Zaytsev 11 each Asts: Chang Tsung-Hsien 4	Pts: Joseph Lin 20; Rebs: Byron Mullens 12; Asts: Joseph Lin 6
Series tied, 1–1

Xinzhuang Gymnasium, New Taipei City
Attendance: 6,540
Referees: Chen Hung-Ming, Yeh Chun-Hung, Tsung Hsiu-Hui

June 8
7:00pm

boxscore

New Taipei Kings 91, Taipei Fubon Braves 97
Scoring by quarter: 20–17, 22–22, 26–28, 23–30
Pts: Joseph Lin 20; Rebs: Byron Mullens 17; Asts: Joseph Lin 5	Pts: Chris Johnson 29; Rebs: Chris Johnson 23; Asts: Chang Tsung-Hsien 3
Braves leads series, 2–1

Taipei Heping Basketball Gymnasium, Taipei City
Attendance: 7,000
Referees: Chang Lu-Yueh, Huang Chen-Feng, Mei Ming-Sheng

June 10
5:00pm

boxscore

New Taipei Kings 107, Taipei Fubon Braves 97
Scoring by quarter: 31–18, 24–18, 31–32, 21–29
Pts: Byron Mullens 28; Rebs: Kenny Manigault 18; Asts: Kenny Manigault 10	Pts: Chou Kuei-Yu 19; Rebs: Mike Singletary 13; Asts: Mike Singletary 8
Series tied, 2–2

Taipei Heping Basketball Gymnasium, Taipei City
Attendance: 7,000
Referees: Pang Yun-Han, Hung Yung-Yu, Sung Ming-Lu

June 12
7:00pm

boxscore

Taipei Fubon Braves 111, New Taipei Kings 105
Scoring by quarter: 32–22, 29–28, 32–37, 18–18
Pts: Ihor Zaytsev 33; Rebs: Chris Johnson 11; Asts: Lin Chih-Chieh 7	Pts: Byron Mullens 26; Rebs: Byron Mullens 11; Asts: Kenny Manigault 8
Braves leads series, 3–2

Xinzhuang Gymnasium, New Taipei City
Attendance: 7,000
Referees: Lai Jian-Zhong, Chen Chao-Hung, Yeh Chun-Hung

June 14
7:00pm

boxscore

New Taipei Kings 104, Taipei Fubon Braves 118
Scoring by quarter: 25–26, 30–30, 26–35, 23–27
Pts: Joseph Lin 37; Rebs: Byron Mullens 10; Asts: Kenny Manigault 9	Pts: Chris Johnson 27; Rebs: Chris Johnson 9 Asts: Lin Chih-Chieh 7
Braves wins series, 4–2

Taipei Heping Basketball Gymnasium, Taipei City
Attendance: 7,000
Referees: Chen Hung-Ming, Chang Lu-Yueh, Huang Chen-Feng

Regular-season series
Kings won 5–3 in the regular-season series

November 25, 2022

Boxscore

Taipei Fubon Braves 89, New Taipei Kings 104

Xinzhuang Gymnasium, New Taipei City

December 10, 2022

Boxscore

New Taipei Kings 103, Taipei Fubon Braves 99

Taipei Heping Basketball Gymnasium, Taipei City

December 23, 2022

Boxscore

New Taipei Kings 106, Taipei Fubon Braves 101

Taipei Heping Basketball Gymnasium, Taipei City

January 1, 2023

Boxscore

Taipei Fubon Braves 83, New Taipei Kings 95

Xinzhuang Gymnasium, New Taipei City

February 4, 2023

Boxscore

New Taipei Kings 109, Taipei Fubon Braves 111

Taipei Heping Basketball Gymnasium, Taipei City

March 12, 2023

Boxscore

Taipei Fubon Braves 106, New Taipei Kings 95

Xinzhuang Gymnasium, New Taipei City

March 18, 2023

Boxscore

New Taipei Kings 97, Taipei Fubon Braves 90

Taipei Heping Basketball Gymnasium, Taipei City

April 15, 2023

Boxscore

Taipei Fubon Braves 89, New Taipei Kings 68

Xinzhuang Gymnasium, New Taipei City
