= 2023 PLG finals =

2023 P. League+ finals
Team	Coach	Wins
New Taipei Kings	Ryan Marchand	2
Taipei Fubon Braves	Hsu Chin-Che	4
- Dates: June 3–14
- MVP: Chris Johnson

The 2023 PLG finals is the championship series of the P. League+'s (PLG) 2022–23 season and conclusion of the season's playoffs. The series started on June 3 and ended on June 14.

== Background ==
=== Road to the finals ===
Team	GP	W	L	PCT
z – New Taipei Kings	40	27	13	.675
x – Taipei Fubon Braves	40	25	15	.625
x – Taoyuan Pauian Pilots	40	19	21	.475
x – Formosa Taishin Dreamers	40	19	21	.475
Kaohsiung 17LIVE Steelers	40	17	23	.425
Hsinchu JKO Lioneers	40	13	27	.325

Notes

- z – Clinched home court advantage for the entire playoffs
- x – Clinched playoff spot

Playoff results
New Taipei Kings		Taipei Fubon Braves
Defeated the 4th-seeded Formosa Taishin Dreamers, 3–1	Playoffs	Defeated the 3rd-seeded Taoyuan Pauian Pilots, 3–0

=== Regular season series ===
The Kings won the regular season series 5–3.

November 25, 2022

Boxscore

Taipei Fubon Braves 89, New Taipei Kings 104

Xinzhuang Gymnasium, New Taipei City

December 10, 2022

Boxscore

New Taipei Kings 103, Taipei Fubon Braves 99

Taipei Heping Basketball Gymnasium, Taipei City

December 23, 2022

Boxscore

New Taipei Kings 106, Taipei Fubon Braves 101

Taipei Heping Basketball Gymnasium, Taipei City

January 1, 2023

Boxscore

Taipei Fubon Braves 83, New Taipei Kings 95

Xinzhuang Gymnasium, New Taipei City

February 4, 2023

Boxscore

New Taipei Kings 109, Taipei Fubon Braves 111

Taipei Heping Basketball Gymnasium, Taipei City

March 12, 2023

Boxscore

Taipei Fubon Braves 106, New Taipei Kings 95

Xinzhuang Gymnasium, New Taipei City

March 18, 2023

Boxscore

New Taipei Kings 97, Taipei Fubon Braves 90

Taipei Heping Basketball Gymnasium, Taipei City

April 15, 2023

Boxscore

Taipei Fubon Braves 89, New Taipei Kings 68

Xinzhuang Gymnasium, New Taipei City

== Series summary ==
Game	Date	Away team	Result	Home team
Game 1	Saturday, June 3	Taipei Fubon Braves	72–86 (0–1)	New Taipei Kings
Game 2	Monday, June 5	Taipei Fubon Braves	87–83 (1–1)	New Taipei Kings
Game 3	Thursday, June 8	New Taipei Kings	91–97 (1–2)	Taipei Fubon Braves
Game 4	Saturday, June 10	New Taipei Kings	107–97 (2–2)	Taipei Fubon Braves
Game 5	Monday, June 12	Taipei Fubon Braves	111–105 (3–2)	New Taipei Kings
Game 6	Wednesday, June 14	New Taipei Kings	104–118 (2–4)	Taipei Fubon Braves

== Game summaries ==
=== Game 1 ===
June 3
5:00pm

Boxscore

Taipei Fubon Braves 72, New Taipei Kings 86
Scoring by quarter: 18–21, 21–22, 17–25, 16–18
Pts: Ihor Zaystev 20; Rebs: Mike Singletary 12; Asts: Chang T., Jian, Singletary 3 each	Pts: Yang Chin-Min 24; Rebs: Byron Mullens 20; Asts: J. Lin, Manigault 5 each
Kings leads series, 1–0

Xinzhuang Gymnasium, New Taipei City
Attendance: 6,540
Referees: Lai Jian-Zhong, Chen Chao-Hung, Yang Shih-Hsien

=== Game 2 ===
June 5
7:00pm

Boxscore

Taipei Fubon Braves 87, New Taipei Kings 83
Scoring by quarter: 16–23, 32–24, 18–10, 21–26
Pts: Ihor Zaytsev 20; Rebs: Johnson, Zaytsev 11 each Asts: Chang Tsung-Hsien 4	Pts: Joseph Lin 20; Rebs: Byron Mullens 12; Asts: Joseph Lin 6
Series tied, 1–1

Xinzhuang Gymnasium, New Taipei City
Attendance: 6,540
Referees: Chen Hung-Ming, Yeh Chun-Hung, Tsung Hsiu-Hui

=== Game 3 ===
June 8
7:00pm

Boxscore

New Taipei Kings 91, Taipei Fubon Braves 97
Scoring by quarter: 20–17, 22–22, 26–28, 23–30
Pts: Joseph Lin 20; Rebs: Byron Mullens 17; Asts: Joseph Lin 5	Pts: Chris Johnson 29; Rebs: Chris Johnson 23; Asts: Chang Tsung-Hsien 3
Braves leads series, 2–1

Taipei Heping Basketball Gymnasium, Taipei City
Attendance: 7,000
Referees: Chang Lu-Yueh, Huang Chen-Feng, Mei Ming-Sheng

=== Game 4 ===
June 10
5:00pm

Boxscore

New Taipei Kings 107, Taipei Fubon Braves 97
Scoring by quarter: 31–18, 24–18, 31–32, 21–29
Pts: Byron Mullens 28; Rebs: Kenny Manigault 18; Asts: Kenny Manigault 10	Pts: Chou Kuei-Yu 19; Rebs: Mike Singletary 13; Asts: Mike Singletary 8
Series tied, 2–2

Taipei Heping Basketball Gymnasium, Taipei City
Attendance: 7,000
Referees: Pang Yun-Han, Hung Yung-Yu, Sung Ming-Lu

=== Game 5 ===
June 12
7:00pm

Boxscore

Taipei Fubon Braves 111, New Taipei Kings 105
Scoring by quarter: 32–22, 29–28, 32–37, 18–18
Pts: Ihor Zaytsev 33; Rebs: Chris Johnson 11; Asts: Lin Chih-Chieh 7	Pts: Byron Mullens 26; Rebs: Byron Mullens 11; Asts: Kenny Manigault 8
Braves leads series, 3–2

Xinzhuang Gymnasium, New Taipei City
Attendance: 6,540
Referees: Lai Jian-Zhong, Chen Chao-Hung, Yeh Chun-Hung

=== Game 6 ===
June 14
7:00pm

Boxscore

New Taipei Kings 104, Taipei Fubon Braves 118
Scoring by quarter: 25–26, 30–30, 26–35, 23–27
Pts: Joseph Lin 37; Rebs: Byron Mullens 10; Asts: Kenny Manigault 9	Pts: Chris Johnson 27; Rebs: Chris Johnson 9 Asts: Lin Chih-Chieh 7
Braves wins series, 4–2

Taipei Heping Basketball Gymnasium, Taipei City
Attendance: 7,000
Referees: Chen Hung-Ming, Chang Lu-Yueh, Huang Chen-Feng

== Rosters ==
=== New Taipei Kings ===
2022–23 New Taipei Kings roster
Players
Coaches

Pos.	No.	Nat.	Name	Ht.	Wt.	DOB (YYYY-MM-DD)	From
G	1	(United States) (Taiwan)	Joseph Lin	1.82 m (6 ft 0 in)	69 kg (152 lb)	32 – 21 June 1992	Hamilton
G	2	(Taiwan)	Lin Shih-Hsuan	1.77 m (5 ft 10 in)	76 kg (168 lb)	26 – 28 December 1998	NTNU
F	3	(Taiwan)	Chen Chun-Nan	1.90 m (6 ft 3 in)	90 kg (198 lb)	24 – 20 April 2000	NTSU
G	4	(Taiwan)	Li Wei-Ting	1.81 m (5 ft 11 in)	84.3 kg (186 lb)	25 – 3 October 1999	SHU
C	5	(United States) (United Kingdom)	Byron Mullens (I)	2.13 m (7 ft 0 in)	122 kg (269 lb)	36 – 14 February 1989	Ohio State
F	6	(Taiwan)	Yang Chin-Min (C)	1.90 m (6 ft 3 in)	92 kg (203 lb)	41 – 22 January 1984	Fu Jen
G	7	(Taiwan)	Lin Li-Jen	1.83 m (6 ft 0 in)	85 kg (187 lb)	34 – 16 June 1990	MingDao
G	9	(Taiwan)	Lee Kai-Yan	1.82 m (6 ft 0 in)	80 kg (176 lb)	31 – 6 May 1993	HWU
G	10	(Taiwan)	Chien You-Che	1.80 m (5 ft 11 in)	80 kg (176 lb)	29 – 10 September 1995	Chien Hsin Tech
F	13	(Taiwan)	Yang Hsing-Chih	1.95 m (6 ft 5 in)	100 kg (220 lb)	31 – 9 November 1993	NTNU
F	15	(Taiwan)	Tseng Yu-Hao	1.96 m (6 ft 5 in)	94 kg (207 lb)	25 – 4 August 1999	NCCU
F	17	(Taiwan)	Su Shih-Hsuan	1.97 m (6 ft 6 in)	95 kg (209 lb)	28 – 9 April 1996	NTNU
F	19	(Taiwan)	Lin Chin-Pang	1.90 m (6 ft 3 in)	90 kg (198 lb)	39 – 15 June 1985	NTCPE
G	22	(Taiwan)	Kao Cheng-En	1.78 m (5 ft 10 in)	85 kg (187 lb)	25 – 23 December 1999	Chien Hsin Tech
G	24	(Taiwan)	Hung Chih-Shan	1.76 m (5 ft 9 in)	80 kg (176 lb)	39 – 5 July 1985	NTUT
C	25	(Senegal)	Omar Niang	2.05 m (6 ft 9 in)	98 kg (216 lb)	26 – 15 May 1998	NCCU
C	50	(Taiwan)	Quincy Davis	2.03 m (6 ft 8 in)	114 kg (251 lb)	42 – 16 February 1983	Tulane
F	55	(United States)	Kenny Manigault (I)	1.96 m (6 ft 5 in)	93 kg (205 lb)	33 – 22 May 1991	Pikeville

Head coach

- (United States) Ryan Marchand

Assistant coach(es)

- (United States) Mark Coppola
- (Taiwan) Hsu Hao-Cheng

Strength & conditioning coach(es)

- (Taiwan) Chang Chung-Hsi

Athletic trainer(s)

- (Taiwan) Chiu Po-Kai
- (Taiwan) Wu Chung-Hao

Team manager

- (Taiwan) Hung Chih-Hu

Legend

- (C) Team captain
- (I) Import player
- Injured

=== Taipei Fubon Braves ===
2022–23 Taipei Fubon Braves roster
Players
Coaches

Pos.	No.	Nat.	Name	Ht.	Wt.	Age	From
G	0	(Taiwan)	Lai Ting-En	1.76 m (5 ft 9 in)	70 kg (154 lb)	28 – 22 July 1996	Fu Jen
F	1	(Taiwan)	Chen Fan Po-Yen	1.96 m (6 ft 5 in)	103 kg (227 lb)	25 – 24 January 2000	Chien Hsin Tech
G	3	(Taiwan)	Chang Tsung-Hsien	1.92 m (6 ft 4 in)	88 kg (194 lb)	36 – 27 December 1988	BYU–Hawaii
F/C	5	(United States)	Chris Johnson (I)	2.11 m (6 ft 11 in)	105 kg (231 lb)	39 – 17 July 1985	LSU
G	7	(Taiwan)	Lu Zong-Lin	1.75 m (5 ft 9 in)	70 kg (154 lb)	30 – 17 November 1994	NTUST
F	8	(Taiwan)	Chou Kuei-Yu	1.93 m (6 ft 4 in)	95 kg (209 lb)	26 – 19 July 1998	NTNU
F	10	(France) (Taiwan)	Steven Guinchard	1.95 m (6 ft 5 in)	85 kg (187 lb)	31 – 4 July 1993	EC Georgia
G	11	(Taiwan)	Hung Kai-Chieh	1.85 m (6 ft 1 in)	85 kg (187 lb)	26 – 7 October 1998	NCCU
F	12	(Taiwan)	Lin Chih-Chieh	1.92 m (6 ft 4 in)	92 kg (203 lb)	42 – 11 June 1982	Chinese Culture
F	13	(Taiwan)	Lin Meng-Hsueh	1.95 m (6 ft 5 in)	88 kg (194 lb)	32 – 14 October 1992	NTSU
F	14	(Taiwan)	Tsai Wen-Cheng (C)	1.90 m (6 ft 3 in)	96 kg (212 lb)	39 – 31 May 1985	NCUE
C	15	(Taiwan)	Hsieh Zong-Rong	1.99 m (6 ft 6 in)	80 kg (176 lb)	29 – 16 August 1995	NTUST
F	17	(United States)	Mike Singletary (I)	1.98 m (6 ft 6 in)	103 kg (227 lb)	36 – 19 September 1988	Texas Tech
C	21	(Taiwan)	Tseng Hsiang-Chun	2.05 m (6 ft 9 in)	95 kg (209 lb)	26 – 8 August 1998	Fu Jen
F	23	(Saint Vincent and the Grenadines)	Brendon Smart	1.98 m (6 ft 6 in)	95 kg (209 lb)	29 – 5 October 1995	Chien Hsin Tech
G	24	(Taiwan)	Jian Ting-Jhao	1.83 m (6 ft 0 in)	80.2 kg (177 lb)	27 – 16 January 1998	Chien Hsin Tech
F	29	(Taiwan)	Chang Keng-Yu	1.88 m (6 ft 2 in)	85 kg (187 lb)	29 – 16 October 1995	NTUS
C	32	(Ukraine)	Ihor Zaytsev (I)	2.11 m (6 ft 11 in)	110 kg (243 lb)	35 – 11 May 1989	Ukraine

Head coach

- (Taiwan) Hsu Chin-Che

Assistant coach(es)

- (Taiwan) Wu Yung-Jen
- (Taiwan) Lin Wei-Hao
- (Taiwan) Chiang Chih-Cheng
- (Taiwan) Wei Wei

Strength & conditioning coach(es)

- (Taiwan) Jheng Wei-Syuan

Athletic trainer(s)

- (Taiwan) Lin Wu-Chang
- (Taiwan) Peng Yu-Ming (assistant)

Legend

- (C) Team captain
- (I) Import player
- Injured

== Player statistics ==
Legend
GP	Games played	MPG	Minutes per game	2P%	2-point field goal percentage
3P%	3-point field goal percentage	FT%	Free throw percentage	RPG	Rebounds per game
APG	Assists per game	SPG	Steals per game	BPG	Blocks per game
PPG	Points per game

New Taipei Kings

Player	GP	MPG	PPG	2P%	3P%	FT%	RPG	APG	SPG	BPG
Chen Chun-Nan	2	03:36	0.00	0.00%	0.00%	0.00%	0.50	0.00	0.00	0.50
Chien You-Che	6	10:51	1.00	20.00%	11.11%	50.00%	0.67	0.17	0.33	0.00
Quincy Davis	6	26:50	10.50	65.63%	33.33%	75.00%	7.50	0.33	0.50	0.67
Hung Chih-Shan	6	11:12	1.50	0.00%	18.75%	0.00%	1.00	1.50	0.33	0.00
Lee Kai-Yan	6	26:08	7.50	31.82%	26.92%	76.92%	1.83	1.67	2.00	0.83
Lin Chin-Pang	4	10:12	2.50	83.33%	0.00%	0.00%	0.50	0.00	0.25	0.00
Joseph Lin	6	37:52	18.67	46.77%	40.00%	80.00%	3.50	4.33	0.83	0.50
Lin Li-Jen	2	00:31	0.00	0.00%	0.00%	0.00%	0.00	0.00	0.00	0.00
Kenny Manigault	6	35:06	14.67	48.08%	23.33%	73.91%	7.33	6.67	2.83	0.17
Byron Mullens	6	36:34	20.17	62.00%	42.86%	88.46%	13.67	1.67	0.83	0.83
Omar Niang	2	00:31	0.00	0.00%	0.00%	0.00%	0.00	0.00	0.00	0.00
Su Shih-Hsuan	5	14:34	3.60	25.00%	20.00%	83.33%	3.00	0.00	0.20	0.60
Yang Chin-Min	6	34:53	17.33	52.27%	40.00%	80.00%	4.00	1.83	0.83	0.00

Taipei Fubon Braves

Player	GP	MPG	PPG	2P%	3P%	FT%	RPG	APG	SPG	BPG
Chang Tsung-Hsien	6	28:34	10.83	35.19%	25.00%	100.00%	3.50	2.83	0.67	0.33
Chen Fan Po-Yen	1	02:26	0.00	0.00%	0.00%	0.00%	0.00	0.00	0.00	0.00
Chou Kuei-Yu	6	27:53	9.50	60.00%	26.32%	0.00%	3.17	2.00	1.67	0.00
Steven Guinchard	5	09:31	2.60	33.33%	27.27%	0.00%	1.00	0.40	0.80	0.00
Hsieh Zong-Rong	1	01:21	0.00	0.00%	0.00%	0.00%	0.00	0.00	0.00	0.00
Hung Kai-Chieh	6	18:35	5.83	36.36%	40.00%	100.00%	1.67	1.00	1.00	0.17
Jian Ting-Jhao	6	15:32	5.50	38.89%	25.00%	83.33%	2.17	1.67	0.17	0.00
Chris Johnson	4	34:02	23.25	65.12%	42.11%	81.25%	13.50	2.00	1.75	2.00
Lai Ting-En	6	07:46	1.33	33.33%	0.00%	100.00%	1.50	1.17	0.33	0.00
Lin Chih-Chieh	6	32:08	15.33	73.53%	23.08%	68.18%	4.50	3.67	1.17	0.00
Lin Meng-Hsueh	2	03:11	0.00	0.00%	0.00%	0.00%	0.50	0.00	0.00	0.00
Mike Singletary	2	41:02	10.50	50.00%	6.25%	66.67%	12.50	5.50	2.50	1.50
Brendon Smart	1	09:20	3.00	0.00%	100.00%	0.00%	3.00	0.00	1.00	0.00
Tsai Wen-Cheng	3	11:47	6.67	50.00%	50.00%	50.00%	2.00	1.00	0.33	0.00
Tseng Hsiang-Chun	6	15:59	4.67	52.63%	33.33%	71.43%	3.50	0.33	0.17	1.00
Ihor Zaytsev	6	40:01	19.00	62.90%	33.33%	64.29%	7.50	2.33	1.00	1.00
