= 2022–23 Formosa Taishin Dreamers season =

Taiwanese professional basketball season

Formosa Taishin Dreamers
2022–23 season
- President: Chang Cheng-Chung
- General Manager: Han Chun-Kai
- Head Coach: ~~Kyle Julius~~ (resigned); Lai Po-Lin
- Arena: Intercontinental Basketball Stadium
- P. League+: 19–21 (.475)
- Playoffs: Playoffs (lost to Kings 1–3)
- Scoring leader: Brandon Gilbeck (17.08)
- Rebounding leader: Brandon Gilbeck (12.00)
- Assists leader: Lin Chun-Chi (4.35)
- Highest home attendance: 3,000 (13 games)
- Lowest home attendance: 2,528 (March 26, 2023)
- Average home attendance: 2,893
- Biggest win: Dreamers 123–99 Lioneers (January 28, 2023)
- Biggest defeat: Dreamers 75–108 Braves (November 13, 2022)
- All statistics correct as of May 17, 2023.

The 2022–23 Formosa Taishin Dreamers season was the franchise's 6th season, its third season in the P. LEAGUE+ (PLG). The Dreamers are coached by Kyle Julius in his fourth year as head coach.

== Draft ==
The Dreamers' 2022 first-round draft pick and Chieng Li-Huan was traded to Taoyuan Pilots in exchange for Lin Yao-Tsung and Wu Chia-Chun. The Dreamers doesn't select any players in the draft.

== Standings ==
Pos	Team	W	L	PCT	GB	Qualification
1	New Taipei Kings	27	13	.675	—	Playoffs
2	Taipei Fubon Braves	25	15	.625	2	Playoffs
3	Taoyuan Pauian Pilots	19	21	.475	8	Playoffs
4	Formosa Taishin Dreamers	19	21	.475	8	Playoffs
5	Kaohsiung 17LIVE Steelers	17	23	.425	10	
6	Hsinchu JKO Lioneers	13	27	.325	14	

Updated to match(es) played on May 14, 2023. Source: P.League+

== Roster ==
Note: Flags indicate national team eligibility at FIBA-sanctioned events. Players may hold other non-FIBA nationalities not displayed.

2022–23 Formosa Taishin Dreamers roster
Players
Coaches

Pos.	No.	Nat.	Name	Ht.	Wt.	Age	From
G	0	(Taiwan)	Chen Jen-Jei	1.83 m (6 ft 0 in)	79 kg (174 lb)	29 – 16 September 1997	Grand View
G	3	(Taiwan)	Wu Chia-Chun	1.74 m (5 ft 9 in)	68 kg (150 lb)	32 – 3 March 1994	NTSU
F	5	(United States)	Chris McCullough (I)	2.08 m (6 ft 10 in)	102 kg (225 lb)	31 – 5 February 1995	Syracuse
F	7	(Taiwan)	Lin Yao-Tsung	1.94 m (6 ft 4 in)	100 kg (220 lb)	36 – 7 September 1990	MingDao
G	8	(Taiwan)	Wang Chen-Yuan	1.76 m (5 ft 9 in)	70 kg (154 lb)	28 – 2 September 1998	NCCU
G	11	(Taiwan)	Lin Chun-Chi	1.75 m (5 ft 9 in)	70 kg (154 lb)	28 – 29 January 1998	Chien Hsin Tech
G	14	(Taiwan)	Wu Yung-Sheng	1.86 m (6 ft 1 in)	82 kg (181 lb)	29 – 19 October 1996	Sacramento State
G	18	(Taiwan)	Yang Shen-Yen	1.78 m (5 ft 10 in)	80 kg (176 lb)	29 – 18 January 1997	NTSU
F	21	(Taiwan) (United States)	Douglas Creighton	2.00 m (6 ft 7 in)	90 kg (198 lb)	41 – 7 March 1985	Madonna
F	23	(United States) (Taiwan)	Kenneth Chien	1.85 m (6 ft 1 in)	86 kg (190 lb)	31 – 6 February 1995	Broward
F	24	(United States) (Taiwan)	Randall Walko (injured)	1.96 m (6 ft 5 in)	93 kg (205 lb)	28 – 21 September 1998	TCNJ
C	26	(Taiwan)	Lee Te-Wei	2.00 m (6 ft 7 in)	105 kg (231 lb)	34 – 15 October 1991	Neng Ren VS
F	28	(Taiwan)	Lu Kuan-Liang	1.85 m (6 ft 1 in)	79 kg (174 lb)	35 – 9 April 1991	NTUA
G	30	(Taiwan)	Wu Sung-Wei	1.82 m (6 ft 0 in)	82 kg (181 lb)	33 – 21 May 1993	I-Shou
C	34	(United States)	Brandon Gilbeck (I)	2.13 m (7 ft 0 in)	107 kg (236 lb)	29 – 9 December 1996	Western Illinois
F	35	(Turkey)	Ilkan Karaman (I)	2.06 m (6 ft 9 in)	115 kg (254 lb)	36 – 13 May 1990	Turkey
F	88	(Taiwan)	Chou Po-Chen	1.98 m (6 ft 6 in)	98 kg (216 lb)	36 – 8 August 1990	NTNU

Head coach

- (Taiwan) Lai Po-Lin

Assistant coach(es)

- (Taiwan) Chen Shih-Nien
- (Taiwan) Liu Wen-He
- (Netherlands) Thomas Roijakkers

Athletic trainer(s)

- (Taiwan) Hou Yao-Hsin

Team manager

- (Taiwan) Wang Yu-Chih

Legend

- (C) Team captain
- (I) Import player
- Injured

- Roster
Updated: 18 March 2023

== Game log ==
=== Be Heroes Changhua Classic Basketball ===
August 27
2:00pm

recap

Chinese Taipei National Training Team 67, Formosa Taishin Dreamers 57

Changhua Xizhou Gardens Industry Exhibition Hall, Changhua County

=== Preseason ===
2022 preseason game log
Total: 2–0 (home: 1–0; road: 1–0)
Preseason : 2–0 (Home: 1–0; Road: 1–0)

Game	Date	Team	Score	High points	High rebounds	High assists	Location Attendance	Record
1	October 8	@Lioneers	W 115–100	Malcolm Miller (35)	Brandon Gilbeck (11)	Wu Chia-Chun (6)	Fengshan Arena; 4,205	1–0
2	October 9	Pilots	W 108–88	Sir'Dominic Pointer (21)	Brandon Gilbeck (8)	Lin Chun-Chi (5)	Fengshan Arena; 3,668	2–0

2022–23 schedule

=== Regular season ===
2022–23 game log
Total: 19–21 (home: 12–8; road: 7–13)
November : 3–2 (Home: 2–2; Road: 1–0)

Game	Date	Team	Score	High points	High rebounds	High assists	Location Attendance	Record
1	November 12	Steelers	W 84–76	Malcolm Miller (30)	Malcolm Miller (14)	Lu Kuan-Liang (5)	Intercontinental Basketball Stadium; 3,000	1–0
2	November 13	Braves	L 75–108	Malcolm Miller (19)	Malcolm Miller (8)	Wu Yung-Sheng (3)	Intercontinental Basketball Stadium; 3,000	1–1
3	November 19	Kings	L 89–101	Brandon Gilbeck (19)	Malcolm Miller (10)	Wu Yung-Sheng (5)	Intercontinental Basketball Stadium; 3,000	1–2
4	November 20	Pilots	W 88–77	Sir'Dominic Pointer (20)	Brandon Gilbeck (9)	Lin Chun-Chi (7)	Intercontinental Basketball Stadium; 3,000	2–2
5	November 27	@Kings	W 102–82	Brandon Gilbeck (34)	Brandon Gilbeck (22)	Lin Chun-Chi (5)	Xinzhuang Gymnasium; 3,320	3–2

December : 2–5 (Home: 1–2; Road: 1–3)

Game	Date	Team	Score	High points	High rebounds	High assists	Location Attendance	Record
6	December 3	@Lioneers	L 77–82	Lin Chun-Chi (22)	Brandon Gilbeck (16)	Kenneth Chien (4)	Hsinchu County Stadium; 4,748	3–3
7	December 6	Braves	L 87–90	Brandon Gilbeck (26)	Brandon Gilbeck (16)	Douglas Creighton (8)	Intercontinental Basketball Stadium; 3,000	3–4
8	December 11	@Braves	W 97–94	Brandon Gilbeck (25)	Brandon Gilbeck (20)	Wu Chia-Chun (6)	Taipei Heping Basketball Gymnasium; 6,138	4–4
9	December 18	@Pilots	L 80–84	Lin Chun-Chi (22)	Brandon Gilbeck (14)	Wu Chia-Chun (4)	Taoyuan Arena; 2,283	4–5
10	December 24	Steelers	W 117–94	Lin Chun-Chi (31)	Sir'Dominic Pointer (14)	Sir'Dominic Pointer (5)	Intercontinental Basketball Stadium; 2,876	5–5
11	December 25	Kings	L 90–99	Lin Chun-Chi (18)	Brandon Gilbeck (13)	Pointer, Wu Y. (4)	Intercontinental Basketball Stadium; 3,000	5–6
12	December 31	@Lioneers	L 97–102	Brandon Gilbeck (27)	Brandon Gilbeck (14)	Faust, Lin C. (6)	Hsinchu County Stadium; 5,247	5–7

January : 1–4 (Home: 1–1; Road: 0–3)

Game	Date	Team	Score	High points	High rebounds	High assists	Location Attendance	Record
13	January 8	@Steelers	L 88–105	Sir'Dominic Pointer (23)	Brandon Gilbeck (14)	Lin Chun-Chi (4)	Fengshan Arena; 1,988	5–8
14	January 13	@Lioneers	L 80–87	Sir'Dominic Pointer (24)	Brandon Gilbeck (11)	Wu Yung-Sheng (6)	Hsinchu County Stadium; 3,914	5–9
15	January 15	@Pilots	L 76–93	Brandon Gilbeck (18)	Brandon Gilbeck (10)	Lin Chun-Chi (6)	Taoyuan Arena; 3,868	5–10
16	January 28	Lioneers	W 123–99	Lu Kuan-Liang (28)	Brandon Gilbeck (14)	Lin Chun-Chi (6)	Intercontinental Basketball Stadium; 3,000	6–10
17	January 29	Kings	L 73–90	Sir'Dominic Pointer (20)	Sir'Dominic Pointer (17)	Sir'Dominic Pointer (5)	Intercontinental Basketball Stadium; 3,000	6–11

February : 4–3 (Home: 2–0; Road: 2–3)

Game	Date	Team	Score	High points	High rebounds	High assists	Location Attendance	Record
18	February 3	@Steelers	W 106–101	Sir'Dominic Pointer (34)	Brandon Gilbeck (14)	Lin Chun-Chi (6)	Fengshan Arena; 1,536	7–11
19	February 5	@Braves	L 75–90	Sir'Dominic Pointer (30)	Ilkan Karaman (10)	Lin C., Pointer (4)	Taipei Heping Basketball Gymnasium; 5,604	7–12
20	February 12	@Steelers	L 80–95	Lin Chun-Chi (21)	Brandon Gilbeck (11)	Lin Chun-Chi (7)	Fengshan Arena; 5,321	8–12
21	February 17	Pilots	W 86–81	Brandon Gilbeck (18)	Brandon Gilbeck (15)	Ilkan Karaman (6)	Intercontinental Basketball Stadium; 2,618	9–12
22	February 18	Steelers	W 102–91	Ilkan Karaman (23)	Ilkan Karaman (11)	Lin Chun-Chi (7)	Intercontinental Basketball Stadium; 3,000	9–13
23	February 24	@Braves	L 87–91	Gilbeck, Lin C. (18)	Brandon Gilbeck (15)	Lin Chun-Chi (5)	Taipei Heping Basketball Gymnasium; 5,126	9–14
24	February 26	@Lioneers	W 100–94	Lee Te-Wei (22)	Ilkan Karaman (16)	Ilkan Karaman (7)	Hsinchu County Stadium; 4,527	10–14

March : 4–2 (Home: 3–0; Road: 1–2)

Game	Date	Team	Score	High points	High rebounds	High assists	Location Attendance	Record
25	March 5	Lioneers	W 111–93	Ilkan Karaman (46)	Ilkan Karaman (17)	Lee, Lin C. (6)	Intercontinental Basketball Stadium; 3,000	11–14
26	March 7	@Kings	L 105–111	Sir'Dominic Pointer (28)	Sir'Dominic Pointer (12)	Lin C., Pointer (6)	Xinzhuang Gymnasium; 2,552	11–15
27	March 11	@Kings	L 89–117	Lin Chun-Chi (17)	Chris McCullough (13)	Lin Chun-Chi (5)	Xinzhuang Gymnasium; 3,577	11–16
28	March 18	@Pilots	W 85–77	Lin Chun-Chi (21)	Lee Te-Wei (13)	Chien, Creighton (3)	Taoyuan Arena; 2,073	12–16
29	March 24	Kings	W 92–79	Chris McCullough (23)	Chris McCullough (23)	Kenneth Chien (5)	Intercontinental Basketball Stadium; 2,586	13–16
30	March 26	Lioneers	W 116–103	Brandon Gilbeck (41)	Gilbeck, Karaman (17)	Lin Chun-Chi (11)	Intercontinental Basketball Stadium; 2,528	14–16

April : 3–5 (Home: 3–3; Road: 0–2)

Game	Date	Team	Score	High points	High rebounds	High assists	Location Attendance	Record
31	April 1	Braves	L 96–100	Chris McCullough (27)	Chris McCullough (11)	Lin Chun-Chi (9)	Intercontinental Basketball Stadium; 3,000	14–17
32	April 2	Steelers	L 87–97	Lin Chun-Chi (16)	Ilkan Karaman (11)	Lin Chun-Chi (5)	Intercontinental Basketball Stadium; 3,000	14–18
33	April 9	@Pilots	L 84–97	Chris McCullough (24)	Chris McCullough (15)	Chien, Creighton (3)	Taoyuan Arena; 2,099	14–19
34	April 15	Lioneers	W 89–85	Lu Kuan-Liang (18)	Brandon Gilbeck (17)	Lin Chun-Chi (6)	Intercontinental Basketball Stadium; 2,659	15–19
35	April 16	Pilots	L 74–87	Brandon Gilbeck (22)	Brandon Gilbeck (11)	Wu Chia-Chun (4)	Intercontinental Basketball Stadium; 2,682	15–20
36	April 22	@Braves	L 96–100	Brandon Gilbeck (29)	Ilkan Karaman (16)	Ilkan Karaman (6)	Taipei Heping Basketball Gymnasium; 6,130	15–21
37	April 29	Braves	W 107–89	Ilkan Karaman (36)	Ilkan Karaman (20)	Lin Chun-Chi (6)	Intercontinental Basketball Stadium; 3,000	16–21
38	April 30	Pilots	W 89–75	Brandon Gilbeck (19)	Brandon Gilbeck (18)	Lin Chun-Chi (5)	Intercontinental Basketball Stadium; 2,909	17–21

May : 2–0 (Home: 0–0; Road: 2–0)

Game	Date	Team	Score	High points	High rebounds	High assists	Location Attendance	Record
39	May 6	@Kings	W 110–105	Ilkan Karaman (30)	Lee Te-Wei (15)	Lee Te-Wei (5)	Xinzhuang Gymnasium; 3,717	18–21
40	May 14	@Steelers	W 92-89	Chris McCullough (28)	Brandon Gilbeck (15)	Lin Chun-Chi (6)	Fengshan Arena; 5321	19-21

2022–23 schedule

=== Playoffs ===
2023 playoffs game log
Total: 1–3 (home: 1–1; road: 0–2)
Playoffs : 1–3 (Home: 1–1; Road: 0–2)

Game	Date	Team	Score	High points	High rebounds	High assists	Location Attendance	Record
1	May 19	@Kings	L 84–103	Chris McCullough (17)	Chris McCullough (22)	Chris McCullough (4)	Xinzhuang Gymnasium; 5,538	0–1
2	May 21	@Kings	L 83–102	Ilkan Karaman (29)	Ilkan Karaman (9)	Lin Chun-Chi (10)	Xinzhuang Gymnasium; 6,360	0–2
3	May 25	Kings	W 115–95	Ilkan Karaman (30)	Ilkan Karaman (19)	Ilkan Karaman (6)	Intercontinental Basketball Stadium; 3,000	1–2
4	May 27	Kings	L 100–108	Ilkan Karaman (31)	Brandon Gilbeck (12)	Lin Chun-Chi (7)	Intercontinental Basketball Stadium; 3,000	1–3

2022–23 schedule

== Player statistics ==
Legend
GP	Games played	MPG	Minutes per game	2P%	2-point field goal percentage
3P%	3-point field goal percentage	FT%	Free throw percentage	RPG	Rebounds per game
APG	Assists per game	SPG	Steals per game	BPG	Blocks per game
PPG	Points per game		Led the league

=== Regular season ===
Player	GP	MPG	PPG	2P%	3P%	FT%	RPG	APG	SPG	BPG
Chen Jen-Jei	23	15:11	6.22	48.94%	31.40%	80.00%	2.48	0.35	0.17	0.00
Kenneth Chien	31	32:05	9.39	42.11%	27.97%	53.33%	4.23	2.55	1.03	0.23
Chou Po-Chen	26	16:02	2.62	44.74%	25.81%	41.67%	3.46	0.58	0.42	0.27
Douglas Creighton	25	20:53	6.44	40.91%	33.87%	94.44%	2.96	1.84	1.08	0.04
Nick Faust^{≠‡}	1	27:00	16.00	60.00%	16.67%	87.50%	9.00	6.00	1.00	0.00
Brandon Gilbeck	37	30:41	17.08	56.04%	21.43%	59.55%	12.00	0.76	1.14	2.95
Ilkan Karaman^{≠}	13	31:38	20.85	52.54%	21.33%	50.68%	13.46	3.00	1.46	1.08
Lee Te-Wei	39	21:07	6.18	45.05%	22.58%	47.22%	5.44	1.56	0.54	0.67
Lin Chun-Chi	40	28:26	13.85	40.61%	39.17%	80.71%	3.88	4.35	0.78	0.03
Lin Yao-Tsung	22	07:50	1.59	40.74%	36.36%	14.29%	2.32	0.27	0.41	0.09
Lu Kuan-Liang	39	23:57	7.56	36.52%	35.64%	66.67%	2.31	1.26	0.82	0.03
Chris McCullough^{≠}	8	30:49	18.88	44.66%	15.38%	63.64%	12.50	1.88	2.38	0.75
Malcolm Miller^{‡}	5	39:43	17.80	56.67%	27.66%	61.54%	10.40	2.00	2.00	1.60
Sir'Dominic Pointer^{‡}	15	33:10	19.20	52.07%	26.98%	71.76%	9.40	3.33	2.40	2.93
Randall Walko	Did not play									
Wang Chen-Yuan	6	02:56	2.00	0.00%	60.00%	60.00%	0.50	0.17	0.17	0.00
Wu Chia-Chun	38	18:34	4.95	42.20%	34.72%	60.00%	1.89	2.26	0.68	0.08
Wu Sung-Wei	7	02:41	0.43	0.00%	25.00%	0.00%	0.43	0.00	0.00	0.00
Wu Yung-Sheng	38	24:42	6.21	32.77%	28.16%	50.00%	2.45	2.00	1.00	0.13
Yang Shen-Yen	12	03:18	0.58	50.00%	16.67%	0.00%	0.33	0.17	0.08	0.00

^{‡} Waived during the season
^{≠} Acquired during the season

=== Playoffs ===
Player	GP	MPG	PPG	2P%	3P%	FT%	RPG	APG	SPG	BPG
Chen Jen-Jei	4	15:26	9.75	60.00%	58.33%	0.00%	2.25	0.75	0.50	0.25
Kenneth Chien	4	23:29	4.25	27.27%	7.69%	50.00%	2.50	2.25	1.25	0.00
Chou Po-Chen	4	09:51	1.00	25.00%	0.00%	40.00%	3.25	0.50	0.00	0.25
Douglas Creighton	4	30:53	7.00	41.67%	23.08%	0.00%	3.75	3.00	0.50	0.25
Brandon Gilbeck	4	32:05	19.75	51.92%	0.00%	59.52%	11.50	1.25	1.25	2.75
Ilkan Karaman	3	34:10	30.00	55.56%	38.46%	57.69%	11.67	3.33	2.33	0.67
Lee Te-Wei	4	11:20	3.25	57.14%	0.00%	83.33%	3.25	0.50	0.25	0.00
Lin Chun-Chi	4	27:11	11.25	47.83%	17.65%	82.35%	5.00	6.00	1.00	0.00
Lin Yao-Tsung	1	02:22	0.00	0.00%	0.00%	0.00%	1.00	0.00	0.00	0.00
Lu Kuan-Liang	4	30:36	6.75	50.00%	33.33%	0.00%	3.50	1.50	1.00	0.00
Chris McCullough	1	36:58	17.00	31.25%	33.33%	33.33%	22.00	4.00	3.00	1.00
Wang Chen-Yuan	1	01:49	0.00	0.00%	0.00%	0.00%	0.00	0.00	0.00	0.00
Wu Chia-Chun	1	12:13	3.00	0.00%	100.00%	0.00%	2.00	0.00	0.00	0.00
Wu Sung-Wei	2	1:14	0.00	0.00%	0.00%	0.00%	0.00	0.00	0.00	0.00
Wu Yung-Sheng	4	17:31	4.25	30.00%	21.43%	66.67%	2.25	1.00	0.00	0.00
Yang Shen-Yen	4	01:58	0.75	0.00%	100.00%	0.00%	0.00	0.00	0.00	0.00

== Transactions ==
=== Overview ===
Players Added

Via trade

- Lin Yao-Tsung
- Wu Chia-Chun

Free agency

- Chou Po-Chen
- Nick Faust
- Brandon Gilbeck
- Ilkan Karaman
- Lu Kuan-Liang
- Chris McCullough
- Malcolm Miller
- Sir'Dominic Pointer
Players Lost

Free agency

- Julian Boyd
- Brandon Gilbeck
- Stefan Jankovic

Via trade

- Chieng Li-Huan

Waived

- Nick Faust
- Malcolm Miller
- Sir'Dominic Pointer

=== Trades ===
July 14, 2022
To Formosa Taishin Dreamers

- Lin Yao-Tsung
- Wu Chia-Chun
To Taoyuan Pilots

- Chieng Li-Huan
- 2022 first-round pick

=== Free Agency ===
==== Additions ====
Date	Player	Contract terms	Former team	Ref.
July 8, 2022	Lu Kuan-Liang	—N/a	Yulon Luxgen Dinos	
July 9, 2022	Chou Po-Chen	—N/a	Yulon Luxgen Dinos	
July 22, 2022	Brandon Gilbeck	—N/a	(Canada) Fraser Valley Bandits	
August 30, 2022	Malcolm Miller	—N/a	(Puerto Rico) Grises de Humacao	
September 8, 2022	Sir'Dominic Pointer	—N/a	(Cyprus) APOEL	
December 15, 2022	Nick Faust	—N/a	(Bahrain) Al-Ahli	
January 20, 2023	Ilkan Karaman	—N/a	(Turkey) Manisa Büyükşehir Belediyespor	
February 27, 2023	Chris McCullough	—N/a	New Taipei Kings	

==== Subtractions ====
Date	Player	Reason	New Team	Ref.
—N/a	Stefan Jankovic	—N/a	(Canada) Vancouver Bandits	
July 6, 2022	Brandon Gilbeck	—N/a	(Canada) Fraser Valley Bandits	
August 9, 2022	Julian Boyd	—N/a	Changhua BLL	
August 29, 2022	Cheng Tzu-Yang	out on loan	Changhua BLL	
December 15, 2022	Malcolm Miller	contract terminated	(France) Limoges CSP	
January 9, 2023	Nick Faust	contract terminated	Tainan TSG GhostHawks	
March 18, 2023	Sir'Dominic Pointer	waived	(Czech Republic) Basket Brno	

== Awards ==
=== End-of-Season Awards ===
Recipient	Award	Ref.
Brandon Gilbeck	Blocks Leader	
Brandon Gilbeck	All-Defensive Team	
Brandon Gilbeck	Defensive Player of the Year	
Lin Chun-Chi	6th Man of the Year	
Lin Chun-Chi	All-PLG Second Team	

=== Players of the Week ===
Week	Recipient	Date awarded	Ref.
Week 8	Lin Chun-Chi	December 23 - December 27	
Week 16	Wu Yung-Sheng	February 17 - February 21	
Week 17	Lee Te-Wei	February 24 - February 28	
Week 18	Ilkan Karaman	March 4 - March 7	
Week 21	Brandon Gilbeck	March 24 - March 28	
