= 2022–23 Taoyuan Pauian Pilots season =

Taiwanese professional basketball season

Taoyuan Pauian Pilots
2022–23 season
- President: Li Chung-Shu
- General Manager: Chen Hsin-An
- Head Coach: Iurgi Caminos
- Arena: Taoyuan Arena
- P. League+: 19–21 (.475)
- Playoffs: Playoffs (lost to Braves 0–3)
- Scoring leader: Jason Washburn(21.31)
- Rebounding leader: Jason Washburn(10.78)
- Assists leader: Pai Yao-Cheng(3.75)
- Highest home attendance: 5,000 (April 14, 2023)
- Lowest home attendance: 2,073 (March 18, 2023)
- Average home attendance: 3,198
- Biggest win: Pilots 103–60 Lioneers (December 24, 2022)
- Biggest defeat: Pilots 63–93 Steelers (March 5, 2023)
- All statistics correct as of April 15, 2023.

The 2022–23 Taoyuan Pauian Pilots season was the franchise's 3rd season, its third season in the P. LEAGUE+ (PLG), its 3rd in Taoyuan City. The Pilots signed Iurgi Caminos as their head coach.

On October 6, 2022, the team was renamed Taoyuan Pauian Pilots.

== Draft ==
Round	Pick	Player	Position	Status	School/club team
1	1	Chang Chen-Ya	F	Local	NCCU
1	3	Pai Yao-Cheng	G	Local	ISU
1	4	Amdy Dieng	C	Foreign student	NCCU
2	7	Lin Tzu-Wei	G	Local	NKNU
3	11	Lu Tsai Yu-Lun	F	Local	Sendai

The Pilots acquired 2022 first-round draft pick from New Taipei Kings in exchange for 2021 first-round draft pick. The Pilots acquired 2022 first-round draft pick and Chieng Li-Huan from Formosa Taishin Dreamers in exchange for Lin Yao-Tsung and Wu Chia-Chun. On August 5, 2022, the third rounder Lu Tsai Yu-Lun has signed with the TaiwanBeer HeroBears of the T1 League.

== Standings ==
Pos	Team	W	L	PCT	GB	Qualification
1	New Taipei Kings	27	13	.675	—	Playoffs
2	Taipei Fubon Braves	25	15	.625	2	Playoffs
3	Taoyuan Pauian Pilots	19	21	.475	8	Playoffs
4	Formosa Taishin Dreamers	19	21	.475	8	Playoffs
5	Kaohsiung 17LIVE Steelers	17	23	.425	10	
6	Hsinchu JKO Lioneers	13	27	.325	14	

Updated to match(es) played on May 14, 2023. Source: P.League+

== Roster ==
Note: Flags indicate national team eligibility at FIBA-sanctioned events. Players may hold other non-FIBA nationalities not displayed.

2022–23 Taoyuan Pauian Pilots roster
Players
Coaches

Pos.	No.	Nat.	Name	Ht.	Wt.	DOB (YYYY-MM-DD)	From
C	1	(Senegal)	Amdy Dieng	2.07 m (6 ft 9 in)	105 kg (231 lb)	27 – 1 August 1998	NCCU
C	4	(United States)	Jeff Ayres (I)	2.08 m (6 ft 10 in)	109 kg (240 lb)	38 – 29 April 1987	Arizona State
G	5	(Taiwan)	Lin Tzu-Wei	1.88 m (6 ft 2 in)	82 kg (181 lb)	25 – 12 May 2000	NKNU
G	6	(Taiwan)	Kuan Ta-You	1.81 m (5 ft 11 in)	89 kg (196 lb)	27 – 15 September 1997	NTSU
G	12	(Taiwan)	Li Chia-Kang	1.85 m (6 ft 1 in)	85 kg (187 lb)	26 – 16 October 1998	NTSU
F	13	(Palestine)	Sani Sakakini (I)	2.03 m (6 ft 8 in)	114 kg (251 lb)	36 – 19 August 1988	Palestine
C	15	(Taiwan)	Chen Kuan-Chuan	1.97 m (6 ft 6 in)	115 kg (254 lb)	31 – 30 December 1993	NTSU
F	21	(Taiwan) (United States)	Chieng Li-Huan	1.90 m (6 ft 3 in)	90 kg (198 lb)	37 – 5 March 1988	NCTU
F	22	(Taiwan)	Huang Hung-Han	1.92 m (6 ft 4 in)	92 kg (203 lb)	30 – 15 October 1994	Chien Hsin Tech
C	25	(Taiwan)	Lin Cheng	2.02 m (6 ft 8 in)	102 kg (225 lb)	25 – 25 July 2000	NTSU
F	27	(Taiwan)	Chang Chen-Ya	1.96 m (6 ft 5 in)	86 kg (190 lb)	25 – 13 October 1999	NCCU
F	28	(Taiwan)	Shih Chin-Yao (C)	1.88 m (6 ft 2 in)	86 kg (190 lb)	34 – 28 October 1990	Chinese Culture
G	30	(Taiwan)	Pai Yao-Cheng	1.84 m (6 ft 0 in)	72 kg (159 lb)	26 – 2 February 1999	I-Shou
C	42	(United States) (Bulgaria)	Jason Washburn (I)	2.13 m (7 ft 0 in)	111 kg (245 lb)	35 – 5 June 1990	Utah
G	69	(Taiwan)	Lu Chun-Hsiang	1.90 m (6 ft 3 in)	82 kg (181 lb)	28 – 15 July 1997	Fu Jen
G	00	(Taiwan)	Chen Yu-Jui	1.85 m (6 ft 1 in)	75 kg (165 lb)	29 – 22 December 1995	NTSU

Head coach

- (Spain) Iurgi Caminos

Assistant coach(es)

- (Spain) Diego Gomez
- (Taiwan) Huang Chi-Feng
- (Taiwan) Yang I-Feng

Strength & conditioning coach(es)

- (Taiwan) Liu Nien-Chieh

Athletic trainer(s)

- (Taiwan) Peng Li-Chen
- (Taiwan) Wu Yun-Kai

Team manager

- (Taiwan) Lee Wen-Hsuan

Legend

- (C) Team captain
- (I) Import player
- Injured

- Roster
Updated: 23 November 2022

== Game log ==
=== Preseason ===
2022 preseason game log
Total: 1–1 (home: 0–0; road: 1–1)
Preseason : 1–1 (Home: 0–0; Road: 1–1)

Game	Date	Team	Score	High points	High rebounds	High assists	Location Attendance	Record
1	October 9	@Dreamers	L 88–108	Lu Chun-Hsiang (21)	Chieng Li-Huan (6)	Ricci Rivero (8)	Fengshan Arena; 3,668	0–1
2	October 10	@Kings	W 105–84	Jason Washburn (21)	Jason Washburn (12)	Chieng Li-Huan (6)	Fengshan Arena; 3,306	1–1

2022–23 schedule

=== Regular season ===
2022–23 game log
Total: 19–21 (home: 11–9; road: 8–12)
November : 1–2 (Home: 0–0; Road: 1–2)

Game	Date	Team	Score	High points	High rebounds	High assists	Location Attendance	Record
1	November 12	@Kings	L 91–104	Jason Washburn (25)	Sani Sakakini (13)	Lu Chun-Hsiang (5)	Xinzhuang Gymnasium; 4,493	0–1
2	November 20	@Dreamers	L 77–88	Sakakini, Shih C. (18)	Sani Sakakini (13)	Chen K., Lu, Sakakini, Shih C. (4)	Intercontinental Basketball Stadium; 3,000	0–2
3	November 27	@Steelers	W 108–78	Lu, Sakakini (21)	Sani Sakakini (15)	Huang Hung-Han (11)	Fengshan Arena; 3,250	1–2

December : 7–1 (Home: 6–0; Road: 1–1)

Game	Date	Team	Score	High points	High rebounds	High assists	Location Attendance	Record
4	December 2	@Kings	L 88–93	Jason Washburn (25)	Jason Washburn (11)	Shih Chin-Yao (6)	Xinzhuang Gymnasium; 2,835	1–3
5	December 4	@Lioneers	W 94–80	Lu Chun-Hsiang (21)	Jeff Ayres (15)	Shih Chin-Yao (8)	Hsinchu County Stadium; 4,062	2–3
6	December 10	Lioneers	W 102–79	Jeff Ayres (23)	Sani Sakakini (13)	Pai, Shih (6)	Taoyuan Arena; 3,286	3–3
7	December 11	Steelers	W 100–83	Jason Washburn (30)	Jason Washburn (15)	Pai Yao-Cheng (8)	Taoyuan Arena; 2,187	4–3
8	December 17	Kings	W 88–74	Chen Kuan-Chuan (18)	Sani Sakakini (8)	Sani Sakakini (4)	Taoyuan Arena; 2,632	5–3
9	December 18	Dreamers	W 84–80	Shih Chin-Yao (18)	Jeff Ayres (10)	Huang, Lu, Sakakini, Shih (4)	Taoyuan Arena; 2,283	6–3
10	December 24	Lioneers	W 103–60	Jason Washburn (27)	Jason Washburn (15)	Pai Yao-Cheng (5)	Taoyuan Arena; 2,658	7–3
11	December 25	Braves	W 90–85	Sani Sakakini (28)	Jeff Ayres (12)	Pai Yao-Cheng (4)	Taoyuan Arena; 3,659	8–3

January : 4–1 (Home: 2–0; Road: 2–1)

Game	Date	Team	Score	High points	High rebounds	High assists	Location Attendance	Record
12	January 1	@Lioneers	W 105–90	Lu Chun-Hsiang (29)	Jeff Ayres (13)	Huang, Lu, Pai, Sakakini (4)	Hsinchu County Stadium; 4,574	9–3
13	January 6	@Steelers	W 110–97	Lu Chun-Hsiang (28)	Sani Sakakini (12)	Sakakini, Shih (5)	Fengshan Arena; 1,283	10–3
14	January 15	Dreamers	W 93–76	Lu Chun-Hsiang (24)	Sani Sakakini (13)	Sani Sakakini (6)	Taoyuan Arena; 3,868	11–3
15	January 28	@Braves	L 74–86	Lu, Sakakini (16)	Sani Sakakini (14)	Pai Yao-Cheng (4)	Taipei Heping Basketball Gymnasium; 7,000	11–4
16	January 31	Lioneers	W 88–70	Jeff Ayres (21)	Jeff Ayres (14)	Lu Chun-Hsiang (6)	Taoyuan Arena; 2,688	12–4

February : 3–4 (Home: 2–2; Road: 1–2)

Game	Date	Team	Score	High points	High rebounds	High assists	Location Attendance	Record
17	February 7	@Lioneers	W 106–92	Lu Chun-Hsiang (25)	Jeff Ayres (13)	Chen Kuan-Chuan (5)	Hsinchu County Stadium; 3,560	13–4
18	February 11	Braves	L 78–80	Jeff Ayres (16)	Jeff Ayres (17)	Lu Chun-Hsiang (4)	Taoyuan Arena; 3,986	13–5
19	February 12	Lioneers	W 95–81	Sani Sakakini (22)	Jeff Ayres (11)	Lu Chun-Hsiang (6)	Taoyuan Arena; 2,367	14–5
20	February 17	@Dreamers	L 81–86	Lu Chun-Hsiang (20)	Ayres, Sakakini (9)	Pai Yao-Cheng (6)	Intercontinental Basketball Stadium; 2,618	14–6
21	February 19	@Braves	L 84–86	Jason Washburn (25)	Jeff Ayres (15)	Chen Kuan-Chuan (6)	Taipei Heping Basketball Gymnasium; 6,048	14–7
22	February 25	Kings	L 73–77	Jason Washburn (20)	Jason Washburn (12)	Huang, Shih, Washburn (4)	Taoyuan Arena; 3,789	14–8
23	February 26	Braves	W 83–80	Jason Washburn (24)	Jeff Ayres (10)	Lu Chun-Hsiang (5)	Taoyuan Arena; 3,857	15–8

March : 0–6 (Home: 0–4; Road: 0–2)

Game	Date	Team	Score	High points	High rebounds	High assists	Location Attendance	Record
24	March 4	Kings	L 95–98	Jeff Ayres (26)	Jeff Ayres (15)	Shih Chin-Yao (6)	Taoyuan Arena; 2,669	15–9
25	March 5	Steelers	L 63–93	Shih Chin-Yao (13)	Jeff Ayres (12)	Pai Yao-Cheng (4)	Taoyuan Arena; 4,300	15–10
26	March 18	Dreamers	L 77–85	Jason Washburn (21)	Jason Washburn (19)	Pai Yao-Cheng (5)	Taoyuan Arena; 2,073	15–11
27	March 19	Steelers	L 86–99	Lu Chun-Hsiang (30)	Jason Washburn (10)	Pai Yao-Cheng (7)	Taoyuan Arena; 4,300	15–12
28	March 26	@Steelers	L 84–99	Jason Washburn (25)	Ayres, Washburn (7)	Shih Chin-Yao (8)	Fengshan Arena; 5,160	15–13
29	March 28	@Kings	L 81–89	Sani Sakakini (15)	Sani Sakakini (9)	Jeff Ayres (6)	Xinzhuang Gymnasium; 2,485	15–14

April : 3–5 (Home: 1–3; Road: 2–2)

Game	Date	Team	Score	High points	High rebounds	High assists	Location Attendance	Record
30	April 1	@Kings	L 87–90(OT)	Jeff Ayres (26)	Jeff Ayres (11)	Pai Yao-Cheng (7)	Xinzhuang Gymnasium; 3,126	15–15
31	April 4	Braves	L 74–77	Ayres, Washburn (16)	Jason Washburn (10)	Kuan Ta-You (5)	Taoyuan Arena; 3,356	15–16
32	April 8	Kings	L 89–90	Jason Washburn (38)	Jason Washburn (16)	Pai Yao-Cheng (5)	Taoyuan Arena; 2,896	15–17
33	April 9	Dreamers	W 97–84	Jason Washburn (19)	Jason Washburn (17)	Pai Yao-Cheng (8)	Taoyuan Arena; 2,099	16–17
34	April 14	Steelers	L 93–101	Jason Washburn (25)	Amdy Dieng (17)	Pai Yao-Cheng (6)	Taoyuan Arena; 5,000	16–18
35	April 16	@Dreamers	W 87–74	Sani Sakakini (21)	Sani Sakakini (15)	Shih Chin-Yao (3)	Intercontinental Basketball Stadium; 2,682	17–18
36	April 23	@Braves	W 95–86	Sani Sakakini (41)	Sani Sakakini (13)	Jeff Ayres (6)	Taipei Heping Basketball Gymnasium; 5,732	18–18
37	April 30	@Dreamers	L 75–89	Jason Washburn (21)	Ayres, Washburn (13)	Pai Yao-Cheng (5)	Intercontinental Basketball Stadium; 2,909	18–19

May : 1–2 (Home: 0–0; Road: 1–2)

Game	Date	Team	Score	High points	High rebounds	High assists	Location Attendance	Record
38	May 5	@Lioneers	W 89–78	Lu Chun-Hsiang (32)	Sani Sakakini (15)	Kuan, Pai (7)	Hsinchu County Stadium; 4,010	19–19
39	May 7	@Braves	L 93–97	Jason Washburn (26)	Amdy Dieng (13)	Pai Yao-Cheng (6)	Taipei Heping Basketball Gymnasium; 5,828	19–20
40	May 13	@Steelers	L 60–80	Jason Washburn (18)	Jason Washburn (16)	Kuan Ta-You (4)	Fengshan Arena; 5,321	19–21

2022–23 schedule

=== Playoffs ===
2023 playoffs game log
Total: 0–3 (home: 0–1; road: 0–2)
Playoffs : 0–3 (Home: 0–1; Road: 0–2)

Game	Date	Team	Score	High points	High rebounds	High assists	Location Attendance	Record
1	May 20	@Braves	L 76–94	Jeff Ayres (24)	Jeff Ayres (13)	Pai Yao-Cheng (6)	Taipei Heping Basketball Gymnasium; 6,825	0–1
2	May 22	@Braves	L 74–83	Lu Chun-Hsiang (20)	Jeff Ayres (17)	Li, Pai (5)	Taipei Heping Basketball Gymnasium; 6,168	0–2
3	May 26	Braves	L 89–101	Jason Washburn (33)	Jeff Ayres (9)	Pai Yao-Cheng (10)	Taoyuan Arena; 5,155	0–3

2022–23 schedule

== Player statistics ==
Legend
GP	Games played	MPG	Minutes per game	2P%	2-point field goal percentage
3P%	3-point field goal percentage	FT%	Free throw percentage	RPG	Rebounds per game
APG	Assists per game	SPG	Steals per game	BPG	Blocks per game
PPG	Points per game		Led the league

=== Regular season ===
Player	GP	MPG	PPG	2P%	3P%	FT%	RPG	APG	SPG	BPG
Jeff Ayres	27	30:10	15.89	49.40%	42.07%	85.11%	10.78	2.19	0.59	0.74
Chang Chen-Ya	33	14:50	5.00	46.67%	33.88%	70.00%	1.58	0.82	0.55	0.09
Chen Kuan-Chuan	35	20:07	5.23	37.76%	30.93%	63.33%	3.00	1.40	0.91	0.31
Chen Yu-Jui	30	11:38	2.03	34.29%	17.50%	53.33%	1.57	0.67	0.67	0.10
Chieng Li-Huan	34	14:57	3.29	45.83%	21.15%	61.90%	2.32	1.44	0.53	0.15
Amdy Dieng	19	13:44	3.63	42.00%	36.36%	60.00%	5.26	0.63	0.37	0.63
Huang Hung-Han	37	19:51	4.49	37.50%	34.62%	65.52%	4.27	2.24	0.76	0.22
Kuan Ta-You	24	10:25	3.29	42.55%	24.24%	65.22%	1.38	1.58	0.79	0.04
Li Chia-Kang	13	21:34	5.08	38.24%	29.27%	100.00%	1.69	1.23	0.69	0.08
Lin Cheng	31	12:14	2.90	35.90%	25.00%	61.90%	2.77	0.45	0.10	0.16
Lin Tzu-Wei	7	05:14	1.43	14.29%	22.22%	100.00%	0.43	0.14	0.29	0.00
Lu Chun-Hsiang	39	31:24	14.31	39.86%	27.87%	74.02%	4.08	2.56	1.72	0.08
Pai Yao-Cheng	40	25:34	5.55	40.58%	23.21%	69.57%	2.93	3.75	0.80	0.18
Sani Sakakini	26	28:50	17.12	49.42%	33.33%	71.32%	10.19	2.92	1.00	0.15
Shih Chin-Yao	34	28:04	9.15	45.81%	26.25%	69.35%	3.38	3.18	1.68	0.09
Shih Yen-Tsung	Did not play									
Su Chih-Cheng	Did not play									
Jason Washburn	26	33:12	21.31	56.34%	32.31%	75.17%	10.62	2.31	0.73	0.85

=== Playoffs ===
Player	GP	MPG	PPG	2P%	3P%	FT%	RPG	APG	SPG	BPG
Jeff Ayres	3	34:41	16.67	33.33%	47.83%	100.00%	13.00	2.33	1.33	1.00
Chang Chen-Ya	3	13:40	4.00	0.00%	33.33%	0.00%	2.00	1.00	0.00	0.00
Chen Kuan-Chuan	2	05:52	0.00	0.00%	0.00%	0.00%	1.50	0.50	0.00	0.00
Chen Yu-Jui	Did not play									
Chieng Li-Huan	1	01:54	0.00	0.00%	0.00%	0.00%	0.00	0.00	0.00	0.00
Amdy Dieng	3	16:40	4.00	40.00%	100.00%	50.00%	6.67	0.00	0.00	0.00
Huang Hung-Han	3	21:32	2.67	75.00%	0.00%	100.00%	2.00	1.33	0.33	0.00
Kuan Ta-You	1	05:13	0.00	0.00%	0.00%	0.00%	0.00	0.00	0.00	0.00
Li Chia-Kang	3	32:30	7.33	36.84%	10.00%	71.43%	3.33	2.67	0.33	0.00
Lin Cheng	1	11:58	0.00	0.00%	0.00%	0.00%	2.00	0.00	2.00	0.00
Lin Tzu-Wei	Did not play									
Lu Chun-Hsiang	3	31:37	20.33	56.52%	27.27%	72.73%	1.00	1.33	1.00	0.00
Pai Yao-Cheng	3	31:25	6.67	22.22%	30.00%	77.78%	2.00	7.00	1.33	0.00
Sani Sakakini	1	34:00	7.00	50.00%	0.00%	75.00%	9.00	1.00	1.00	0.00
Shih Chin-Yao	2	16:17	1.50	33.33%	0.00%	50.00%	1.50	1.50	1.00	0.00
Jason Washburn	2	38:07	22.00	55.88%	50.00%	75.00%	7.50	3.00	0.00	0.50

== Transactions ==
=== Trades ===
July 14, 2022
To Taoyuan Pilots

- Chieng Li-Huan
- 2022 first-round pick
To Formosa Taishin Dreamers

- Lin Yao-Tsung
- Wu Chia-Chun

=== Free Agency ===
==== Additions ====
Date	Player	Contract terms	Former team	Ref.
June 24, 2022	Ricci Rivero	—	(Philippines) UP Fighting Maroons	
July 22, 2022	Sani Sakakini	—	Kuwait SC	
July 26, 2022	Jason Washburn	—	(Japan) Fukushima Firebonds	
August 4, 2022	Chang Chen-Ya	—	NCCU Griffins	
August 4, 2022	Amdy Dieng	—	NCCU Griffins	
August 4, 2022	Lin Tzu-Wei	—	NKNU	
August 4, 2022	Pai Yao-Cheng	—	ISU	
November 18, 2022	Jeff Ayres	—	(Japan) Niigata Albirex BB	

==== Subtractions ====
Date	Player	Reason	New Team	Ref.
July 8, 2022	Devin Robinson	—	(Puerto Rico) Piratas de Quebradillas	
July 19, 2022	Wen Li-Huang	contract terminated	Taichung Suns	
July 26, 2022	Jordan Tolbert	—	Taiwan Beer	
July 26, 2022	Nemanja Bešović	—	(Syria) Al-Karamah	
August 31, 2022	Lin Chin-Pang	contract terminated	New Taipei Kings	
November 4, 2022	Ricci Rivero	injury contract terminated	(Philippines) Phoenix Super LPG Fuel Masters	
November 23, 2022	Shih Yen-Tsung	out on loan	Changhua BLL	
November 23, 2022	Su Chih-Cheng	contract terminated	—	

== Awards ==
=== End-of-Season Awards ===
Recipient	Award	Ref.
Chen Hsin-An	GM of the Year	
Lu Chun-Hsiang	All-Defensive Team	
Lu Chun-Hsiang	All-PLG Team	
Pai Yao-Cheng	Rookie of the Year	
Shih Chin-Yao	All-PLG Second Team	

=== Players of the Week ===
Week	Recipient	Date awarded	Ref.
Week 4	Huang Hung-Han	November 25 - November 29	
Week 5	Lu Chun-Hsiang	December 2 - December 6	
Week 6	Pai Yao-Cheng	December 10 - December 11	
Week 14	Lu Chun-Hsiang	February 3 - February 7	

=== Players of the Month ===
Recipient	Award	Month awarded	Ref.
Lu Chun-Hsiang	December Most Valuable Player	December	
Lu Chun-Hsiang	January Most Valuable Player	January	
