= Sir'Dominic Pointer =

American basketball player (born 1992)

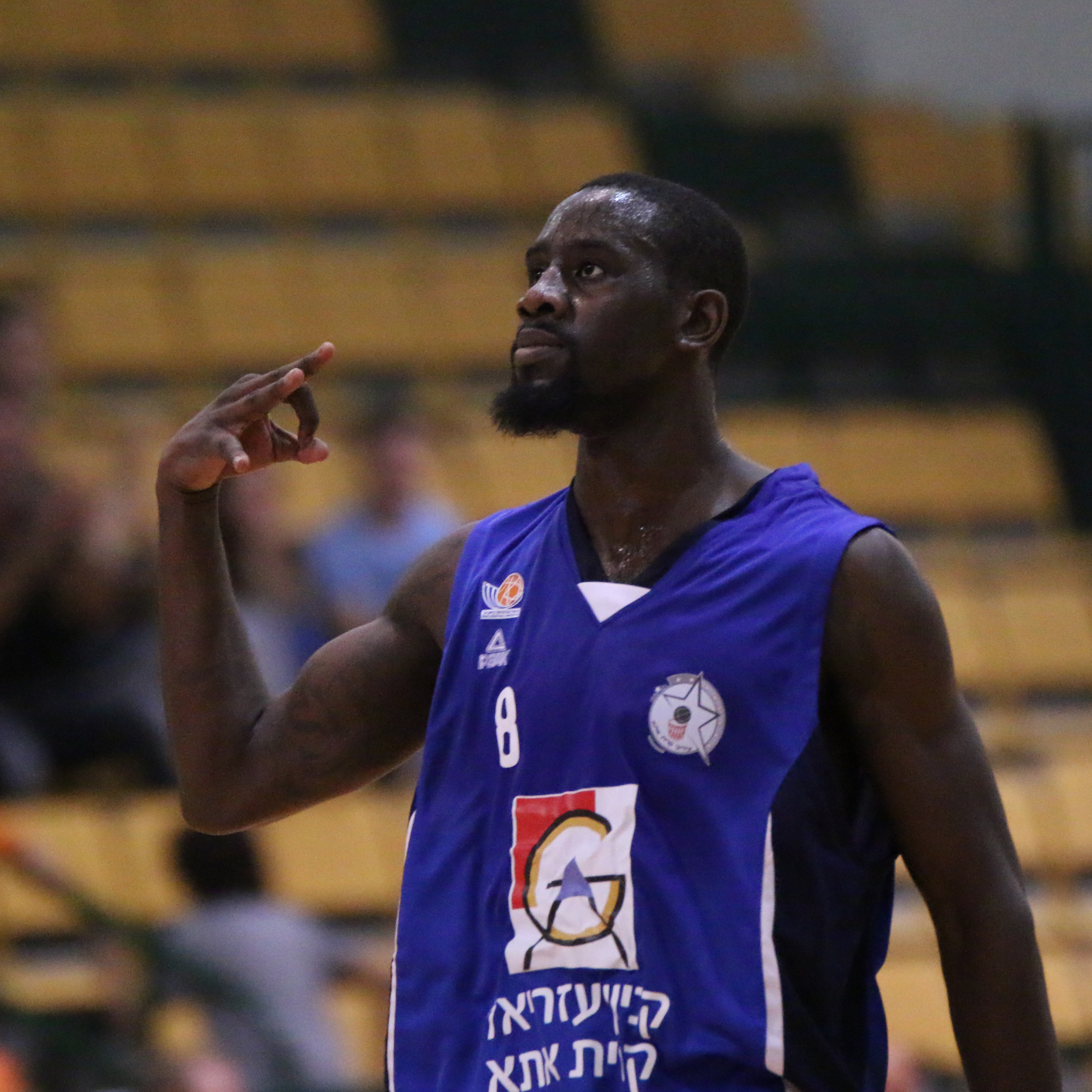
- Pointer with Ironi Kiryat Ata in 2016

Free agent
- Position: Shooting guard / small forward

Personal information
- Born: May 6, 1992 (age 34) Detroit, Michigan, U.S.
- Listed height: 6 ft 6 in (1.98 m)
- Listed weight: 192 lb (87 kg)

Career information
- High school: Quality Education Academy (Winston-Salem, North Carolina)
- College: St. John's (2011–2015)
- NBA draft: 2015: 2nd round, 53rd overall pick
- Drafted by: Cleveland Cavaliers
- Playing career: 2015–present

Career history
- 2015–2016: Canton Charge
- 2016: Hapoel Eilat
- 2016–2017: Ironi Kiryat Ata
- 2017: Byblos Club
- 2018: Alba Fehérvár
- 2018–2021: Canton / Cleveland Charge
- 2019: Trotamundos de Carabobo
- 2021–2022: APOEL
- 2022–2023: Formosa Taishin Dreamers
- 2023: Brno
- 2023–2024: Manama Club
- 2024–2025: Shabab Al Ahli
- 2025–2026: Al Ahly Cairo

Career highlights
- WASL champion (2023); 2× Bahraini League champion (2023, 2024); Bahraini Cup winner (2023); NBA G League All-Defensive Team (2020); Haggerty Award (2015); Second-team All-Big East (2015); Big East Co-Defensive Player of the Year (2015); Big East Most Improved Player (2015)
- Stats at Basketball Reference

Sir'Dominic Denzel Pointer (born May 6, 1992) is an American professional basketball player who last played for Shabab Al Ahli of the Basketball Champions League Asia. He played college basketball at St. John's. He was drafted 53rd overall in the 2015 NBA draft by the Cleveland Cavaliers.

== Early life ==
Pointer was born on May 6, 1992, in Detroit, Michigan, to Anthony Nolan and San Pointer. He has two sisters, Connae and twin Miz'Unique. According to him, his desire to outwork others came from his cousin Michael Robinson, who was shot and killed at age 26. Robinson helped him stay in school, motivated Pointer in basketball, and helped him avoid influence from gangs. Pointer later used his cousin's picture as his profile picture on Twitter and said, "I appreciate him for that."

== High school career ==
Pointer moved to Roseville, Michigan, prior to playing his first two years of high school basketball at Roseville High School. He attended Quality Education Academy in Winston-Salem, North Carolina, in his final two seasons. Following graduation, some recruiting services rated him as 8th best small forward and 24th best player of his class.

== College career ==
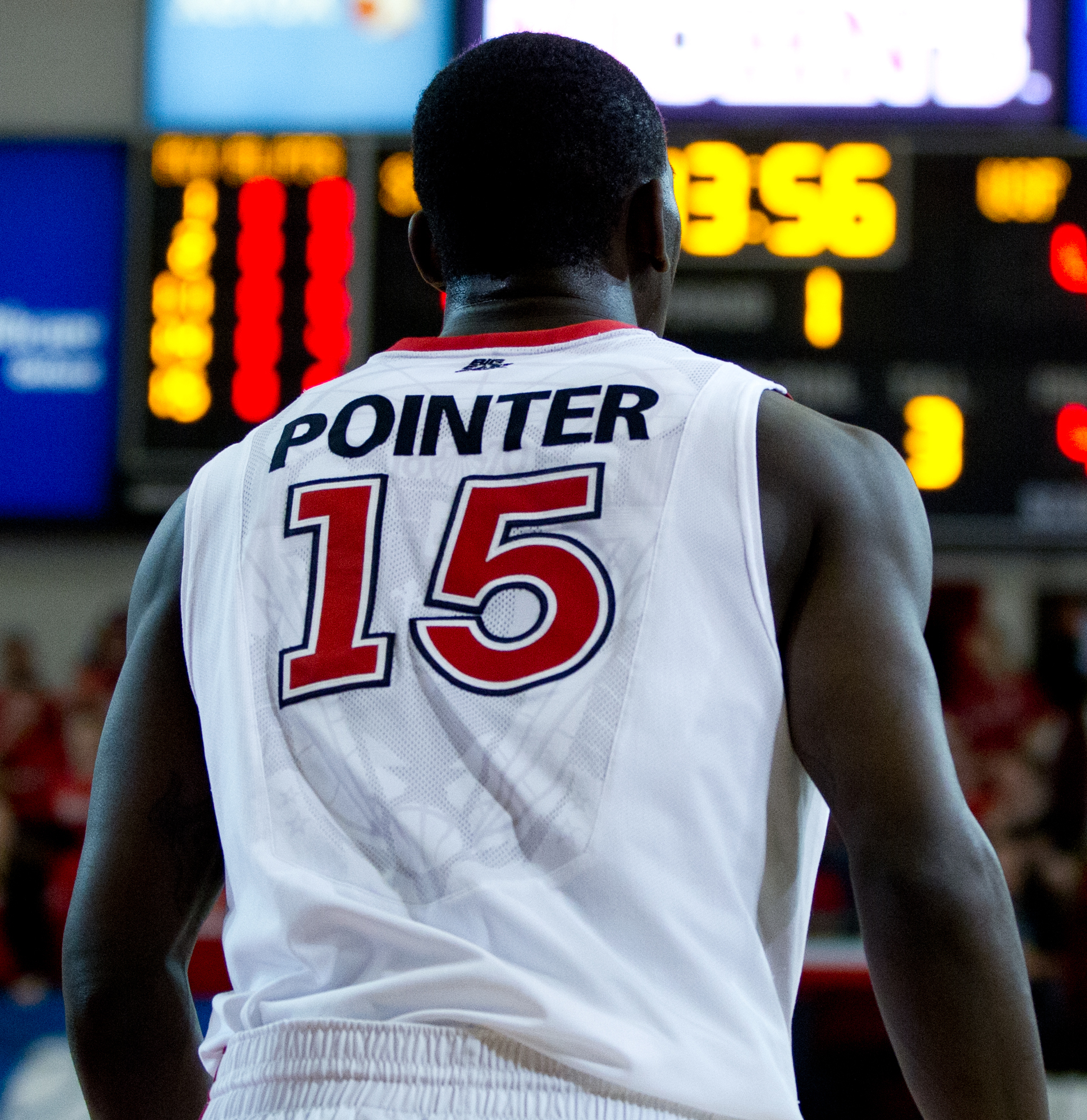
Pointer vs Florida State in 2013.

As a senior at St. John's, Pointer received the Haggerty Award honoring the best college basketball player in New York City metropolitan region. He was named to the All Big East Second Team after averaging 13.7 points, 7.6 rebounds, 3.1 assists and 2.0 steals per game.

== Professional career ==
=== Canton Charge (2015–2016) ===
On June 25, 2015, Pointer was drafted with the 53rd pick of the 2015 NBA draft by the Cleveland Cavaliers. On October 30, he was acquired by the Canton Charge of the NBA Development League, the affiliate team of Cleveland. On November 14, he made his professional debut in a 106–99 loss to the Maine Red Claws, recording 11 points, 8 rebounds, 4 assists and 1 steal in 29 minutes. Pointer averaged 6.9 points, 4.5 rebounds, 1.0 assist, 1.0 steal and 1.4 blocks in 20.3 minutes per game with Canton.

=== Israel (2016–2017) ===
In June, 2016, Pointer joined the Cavaliers for the 2016 NBA Summer League. On August 28, 2016, he signed with Hapoel Eilat of the Israeli League. He left Hapoel after appearing in only two games. He then joined the Ironi Kiryat Ata of the Liga Leumit.

=== Byblos (2017) ===
In July 2017, Pointer re-joined the Cleveland Cavaliers for the 2017 NBA Summer League. On October 16, 2017, he signed with Byblos Club of the Lebanese Basketball League. He left Byblos after appearing in nine games.

=== Alba Fehérvár (2018) ===
On January 13, 2018, Pointer signed with Hungarian club Alba Fehérvár.

=== Second stint with the Canton / Cleveland Charge (2018–2021) ===
Pointer was included in the training camp roster announced on October 20, 2018 and the opening night roster announced on November 1, 2018, by the Canton Charge.

It was reported that the Cleveland Cavaliers signed and waived Pointer in early October, 2019. Pointer was later included in the training camp roster announced on October 26, 2019 and the opening night roster announced on November 7, 2019, by the Canton Charge.

On March 4, 2020, Pointer signed a 10-day contract with the Cleveland Cavaliers. However, the season was suspended due to the COVID-19 pandemic and Pointer's deal expired before he appeared in a game for the team. He rejoined the Charge for the 2020–21 season.

=== APOEL (2021–2022) ===
On July 27, 2021, Pointer signed with APOEL of the Cyprus Basketball Division A.

=== Formosa Taishin Dreamers (2022–2023) ===
On September 8, 2022, Pointer signed with Formosa Taishin Dreamers of the P. League+. On March 18, 2023, Pointer left the team.

=== Brno (2023) ===
On April 14, 2023, Pointer signed with Brno of the National Basketball League.

=== Manama (2023–2024) ===
On May 20, 2023, Pointer signed with Manama Club of the Bahraini Premier League. On May 29, 2023, he won the Bahraini Cup with Manama. With Manama, he also won the West Asia Super League (WASL), and Pointer scored 16 points in the final against Kuwait Club.

=== Shabab Al Ahli (2024–2025) ===
In October 2024, Pointer re-signed with Shabab Al Ahli of the Basketball Champions League Asia.
