= 2022 P. League+ draft =

General information
- Sport: Basketball
- Date: July 28, 2022
- Location: Taipei New Horizon (Taipei)
- Network: YouTube

Overview
- 11 total selections in 3 rounds
- League: P. League+
- First selection: Chang Chen-Ya (Taoyuan Pilots)

The 2022 P. League+ draft, the second edition of the draft, was scheduled to be held on July 28, 2022, at Taipei New Horizon.

== Draft selections ==
G	Guard	F	Forward	C	Center

^{#}	Denotes player who has never appeared in an PLG regular season or playoff game
^{~}	Denotes player who has been selected as Rookie of the Year

Rnd.	Pick	Player	Pos.	Status	Team	School / club team
1	1	Chang Chen-Ya	F	Local	Taoyuan Pilots	NCCU
1	2	Chen Fan Po-Yen	F	Local	Taipei Fubon Braves(from Steelers) (Note: October 27, 2021: Kaohsiung Steelers to Taipei Fubon Braves: Braves acquired 2022 first-round pick; Steelers acquired Wang Lu-Hsiang)	UCH
1	3	Pai Yao-Cheng^{~}	G	Local	Taoyuan Pilots(from Kings) (Note: July 21, 2021: New Taipei Kings to Taoyuan Pilots: Pilots acquired 2022 first-round pick; Kings acquired 2021 first-round pick)	ISU
1	4	Amdy Dieng	C	Foreign student	Taoyuan Pilots(from Dreamers) (Note: July 14, 2022: Formosa Taishin Dreamers to Taoyuan Pilots: Pilots acquired Chieng Li-Huan, 2022 first-round pick; Dreamers acquired Lin Yao-Tsung, Wu Chia-Chun)	NCCU
1	5	Ifeanyi Eboka	F	Foreign student	Hsinchu JKO Lioneers	SHU
1	6	Jian Ting-Jhao	G	Local	Taipei Fubon Braves	UCH
2	7	Lin Tzu-Wei	G	Local	Taoyuan Pilots	NKNU
2	8	Jamarcus Mearidy	G	Foreign student	Kaohsiung Steelers	VNU
2	9	Li Wei-Ting	G	Local	New Taipei Kings	SHU
2	10	Tseng Po-Yu	G	Local	Hsinchu JKO Lioneers	MDU
3	11	Lu Tsai Yu-Lun^{#}	F	Local	Taoyuan Pilots	Sendai

== Notable undrafted players ==
These players were not selected in the 2022 P. League+ draft, but have played at least one game in the P. League+.

Player	Pos.	Status	School/club team
Kao Cheng-En	G	Local	UCH

== Combine ==
The 2022 Draft Combine was held on July 20 at National Taiwan University of Arts Gymnasium.

== Entrants ==
=== Local ===
- Chang Chen-Ya – F, NCCU
- Chen Chia-Hsun – G, USC
- Chen Fan Po-Yen – F, UCH
- Chen Hong-Yu – G, NFU
- Chen Kuei-En – G, VNU
- Chen Ting-Yu – F, PCCU
- Chuang Chia-Cheng – F, NTSU
- He Jia-Jyun – G, NKNU
- Huang Hong-Yu – G, NTNU
- Jian Ting-Jhao – G, UCH
- Jiang Hao-Wei – G, HWU
- Kao Cheng-En – G, UCH
- Kao Shih-Chieh – F, NKNU
- Kuo Han – C, NTSU
- Lai Chun-Ting – G/F, Spire Academy
- Lan Chun-Yi – F, NTUST
- Li Wei-Ting – G, SHU
- Lin Bin-Hao – G, Citrus
- Lin Jhe-Ting – G, FJU
- Lin Tzu-Wei – G, NKNU
- Lin Yu-Kae – G, GBS
- Lu Tsai Yu-Lun – F, Sendai
- Pai Yao-Cheng – G, ISU
- Shen Yu-Chang – F, NTHU
- Tsai Ya-Hsuan – G, NPTU
- Tseng Po-Yu – G, MDU
- Wu Tsung-Hsien – F, NTSU
- Zhang Shi-Wei – F, NTCUST

=== Foreign student ===
Lioneers, Pilots and Steelers were the teams eligible to select foreign students in the draft.

- (Senegal) Amdy Dieng – C, NCCU
- (Nigeria) Ifeanyi Eboka – F, SHU
- (Nigeria) Humphery Gabriel – F, VNU
- (United States) Jamarcus Mearidy – G, VNU
