= Jeff Ayres =

American basketball player (born 1987)

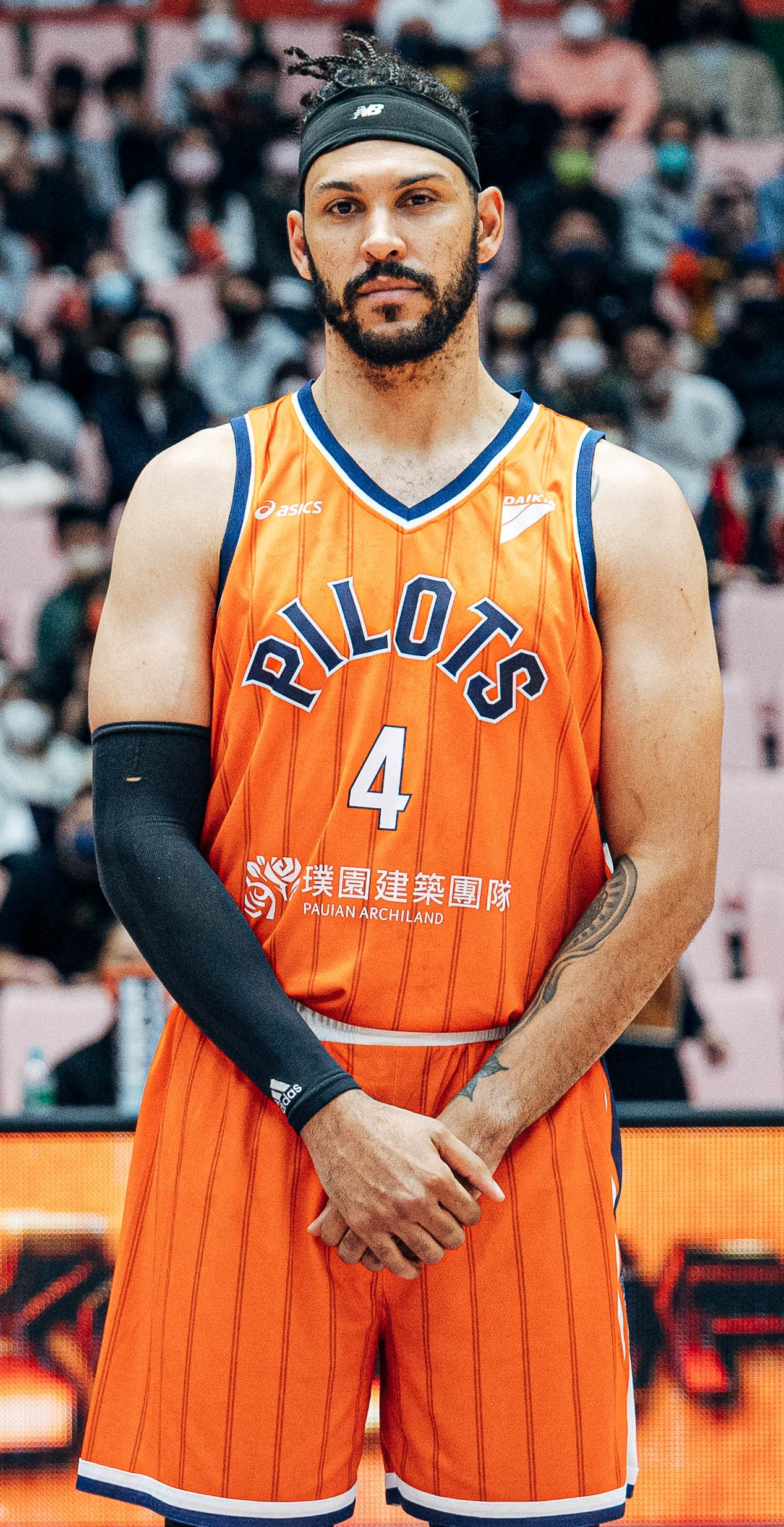
- Ayres with the Taoyuan Pauian Pilots in 2022

No. 12 – Indomables de Ciudad Juárez
- Position: Power forward / center
- League: Liga de Básquetbol Estatal de Chihuahua

Personal information
- Born: April 29, 1987 (age 39) Ontario, California, U.S.
- Listed height: 6 ft 9 in (2.06 m)
- Listed weight: 240 lb (109 kg)

Career information
- High school: Etiwanda (Rancho Cucamonga, California)
- College: Arizona State (2005–2009)
- NBA draft: 2009: 2nd round, 31st overall pick
- Drafted by: Sacramento Kings
- Playing career: 2009–present

Career history
- 2009–2010: Portland Trail Blazers
- 2011–2013: Indiana Pacers
- 2013–2015: San Antonio Spurs
- 2015–2016: Idaho Stampede
- 2016: Los Angeles Clippers
- 2016: Los Angeles D-Fenders
- 2016: CSKA Moscow
- 2016–2017: Los Angeles D-Fenders
- 2017: Alvark Tokyo
- 2017–2018: Eskişehir Basket
- 2018–2019: Ryukyu Golden Kings
- 2019–2020: Shiga Lakestars
- 2020–2021: Nagoya Diamond Dolphins
- 2021–2022: Niigata Albirex BB
- 2022–2023: Taoyuan Pauian Pilots
- 2023: Freseros de Irapuato
- 2024: Rayos de Hermosillo
- 2025–present: Indomables de Ciudad Juárez

Career highlights
- NBA champion (2014); All-NBA D-League First Team (2016); NBA D-League All-Star (2016); CIBACOPA champion (2024); First-team All-Pac-10 (2009); Third-team All-Pac-10 (2008)
- Stats at NBA.com
- Stats at Basketball Reference

Jeffrey Curtis Ayres (né Orcutt; born April 29, 1987), formerly known as Jeff Pendergraph, is an American professional basketball player for Indomables de Ciudad Juárez of the Liga de Básquetbol Estatal de Chihuahua. He attended Etiwanda High School in Rancho Cucamonga, California and played college basketball for the Arizona State Sun Devils.

== College career ==
Ayres attended Arizona State for four seasons, finishing with career averages of 12.6 points, 7.5 rebounds, 1.04 blocked shots and a 58.0 percent shooting accuracy. In his sophomore season, he grabbed a career-high 19 rebounds in a 52–36 victory over Colgate on December 19, 2006. As a senior, Ayres averaged 14.5 points and was named to the Pac-10's First Team. His 66.0 percent field goal mark led the nation. On January 4, 2009, he scored a career-high 31 points, along with a game-high 11 rebounds, in a 90–60 win over Stanford with twenty-one of those points being tallied in the first half.

== Professional career ==
=== Portland Trail Blazers ===
On June 25, 2009, Ayres was selected by the Sacramento Kings with the 31st overall pick of the 2009 NBA draft, only to be traded to the Portland Trail Blazers in exchange for Sergio Rodríguez, the draft rights to Jon Brockman and cash considerations. On September 8, he signed a contract with the Trail Blazers and joined them for the 2009 Summer League, starting all five games and averaging 10.8 points, 7.6 rebounds, 0.6 assists and 1.2 blocked shots. On December 22, he made his NBA debut in an 85–81 win against the Dallas Mavericks, in which he scored 2 points in 4 minutes of playing time.

Ayres scored a career-high 23 points in the last regular season game of the 2009–10 NBA season on April 14, 2010, against the Golden State Warriors. He was waived by the Trail Blazers prior to the start of the 2011 season after suffering a season-ending knee injury during a pre-season game against the Utah Jazz.

=== Indiana Pacers ===
Ayres was signed by the Indiana Pacers for the 2011–12 season. Before the start of the season, he was sidelined with a mild sprain in his knee, suffered when he injured it during a December 10, 2011, practice. On April 23, 2012, Ayres got his first start for the Pacers in a 103–97 win against the Detroit Pistons. In 18 minutes of play he scored 10 points with 7 rebounds, 1 assist and 2 blocks.

On June 4, 2013, Ayres was ejected from Game 7 of the 2013 Eastern Conference Finals by referee Ken Mauer after a shoving match with Miami Heat guard Norris Cole, who was also ejected in the fourth quarter. Entertainer Flo Rida's manager was also ejected after an ongoing verbal spat with Ayres.

=== San Antonio Spurs ===
On July 11, 2013, Ayres signed with the San Antonio Spurs and made his debut on October 30 in a 101–94 win against the Memphis Grizzlies, recording two points, two rebounds, two assists and one block in 11 minutes of playing time. On June 15, 2014, Ayres won his first NBA championship after the Spurs defeated the Miami Heat 4 games to 1 in the 2014 NBA Finals.

=== NBA D-League and Los Angeles Clippers ===
On October 31, 2015, Ayres was selected by the Idaho Stampede with the first overall pick in the 2015 NBA Development League Draft. On November 13, he made his debut with Idaho in a 110–106 loss to the Rio Grande Valley Vipers, recording 18 points, 9 rebounds, 4 assists, 1 block and one steal in 39 minutes of action. On January 29, 2016, he was named in the West All-Star team for the 2016 NBA D-League All-Star Game.

On January 23, 2016, Ayres signed a 10-day contract with the Los Angeles Clippers. The next day, he made his debut in a 112–94 loss to the Toronto Raptors, recording two points, one rebound and one assist in five minutes. On February 2, he signed a second 10-day contract with the Clippers. On February 12, the Clippers did not renew his contract, making him a free agent. On February 20, Ayres returned to Idaho, appearing on the team bench that night.

On March 4, 2016, Idaho traded Ayres to the Los Angeles D-Fenders in exchange for a 2016 first-round draft pick. The next day, he made his debut for the D-Fenders in a 127–117 win over the Texas Legends, recording 16 points and 10 rebounds in 26 minutes off the bench. At the season's end, he was named to the All-NBA D-League First Team.

On March 16, 2016, Ayres returned to the Clippers, signing with the team for the rest of the season.

=== CSKA Moscow and NBA D-League ===
On September 22, 2016, Ayres signed a two-month contract with Russian club CSKA Moscow. Following the expiration of his contract, he parted ways with CSKA on November 23, 2016. In seven games, he averaged 5.4 points and 3.6 rebounds per game.

On December 1, 2016, Ayres was reacquired by the Los Angeles D-Fenders.

=== First stint in Japan ===
On February 16, 2017, Ayres signed with Alvark Tokyo of the Japanese B.League.

=== Turkey ===
On August 12, 2017, Ayres signed with Eskişehir Basket of the Turkish Basketball Super League.

=== Second stint in Japan ===
On September 4, 2018, Ayres signed with Ryukyu Golden Kings of the B.League. He signed with Nagoya Diamond Dolphins on June 20, 2020. He signed with Niigata Albirex BB on June 29, 2021.

=== BIG3 ===
On May 25, 2022, Ayres was drafted by Bivouac with the eighth overall pick of the 2022 BIG3 draft.

== The Basketball Tournament ==
Jeff Ayres played for Team Challenge ALS in the 2018 edition of The Basketball Tournament. In two games with Eberlein Drive, he averaged 6.5 points per game and 2.5 rebounds per game on 100 percent shooting. Team Challenge ALS made it to the West Regional Championship Game before falling to eventual tournament runner-up Eberlein Drive.

== NBA career statistics ==
Legend
GP	Games played	GS	Games started	MPG	Minutes per game
FG%	Field goal percentage	3P%	3-point field goal percentage	FT%	Free throw percentage
RPG	Rebounds per game	APG	Assists per game	SPG	Steals per game
BPG	Blocks per game	PPG	Points per game	**Bold**	Career high
†	Won an NBA championship

=== Regular season ===
Year	Team	GP	GS	MPG	FG%	3P%	FT%	RPG	APG	SPG	BPG	PPG
2009–10	Portland	39	4	10.4	**.662**	–	.900	2.5	.0	**.2**	**.4**	2.7
2011–12	Indiana	20	1	5.3	.417	–	.571	1.6	.2	**.2**	.1	1.7
2012–13	Indiana	37	0	10.0	.484	**.500**	.913	2.8	.4	**.2**	.3	**3.9**
2013–14†	San Antonio	**73**	**10**	**13.0**	.580	–	.691	**3.5**	**.8**	**.2**	.3	3.3
2014–15	San Antonio	51	0	7.5	.579	–	.750	2.3	.3	**.2**	.2	2.7
2015–16	L.A. Clippers	17	0	6.3	.522	.000	**1.000**	1.3	.3	.0	.2	1.8
**Career**		237	15	9.8	.553	.400	.776	2.7	.4	.2	.3	2.9

=== Playoffs ===
Year	Team	GP	GS	MPG	FG%	3P%	FT%	RPG	APG	SPG	BPG	PPG
2010	Portland	3	0	5.7	**.500**	–	**.750**	.7	.0	**.7**	**1.0**	**2.3**
2012	Indiana	4	0	2.3	.333	–	.000	.5	.0	.0	.0	.5
2013	Indiana	9	0	**7.9**	.333	.000	.000	**2.0**	.1	.0	.2	1.8
2014†	San Antonio	**17**	0	3.8	.462	–	.625	1.1	.3	.0	.0	1.0
2015	San Antonio	3	0	4.0	.000	–	.000	1.0	**.7**	.0	.0	.0
**Career**		36	0	4.8	.378	.000	.667	1.2	.2	.1	.1	1.2

== International career statistics ==
Year	Team	GP	GS	MPG	FG%	3P%	FT%	RPG	APG	SPG	BPG	PPG
2017–18	A Tokyo	23	12	21.4	.578	.400	.871	7.0	.8	.4	.6	12.3

== Personal life ==
Jeff Ayres is divorced from Raneem but have two children together. In August 2013, he made an Arizona court filing to change his surname from Pendergraph to Ayres, replacing the surname of his stepfather with that of his biological father. The change was formally announced in September 2013.
