= İlkan Karaman =

Turkish basketball player (1990–2024)

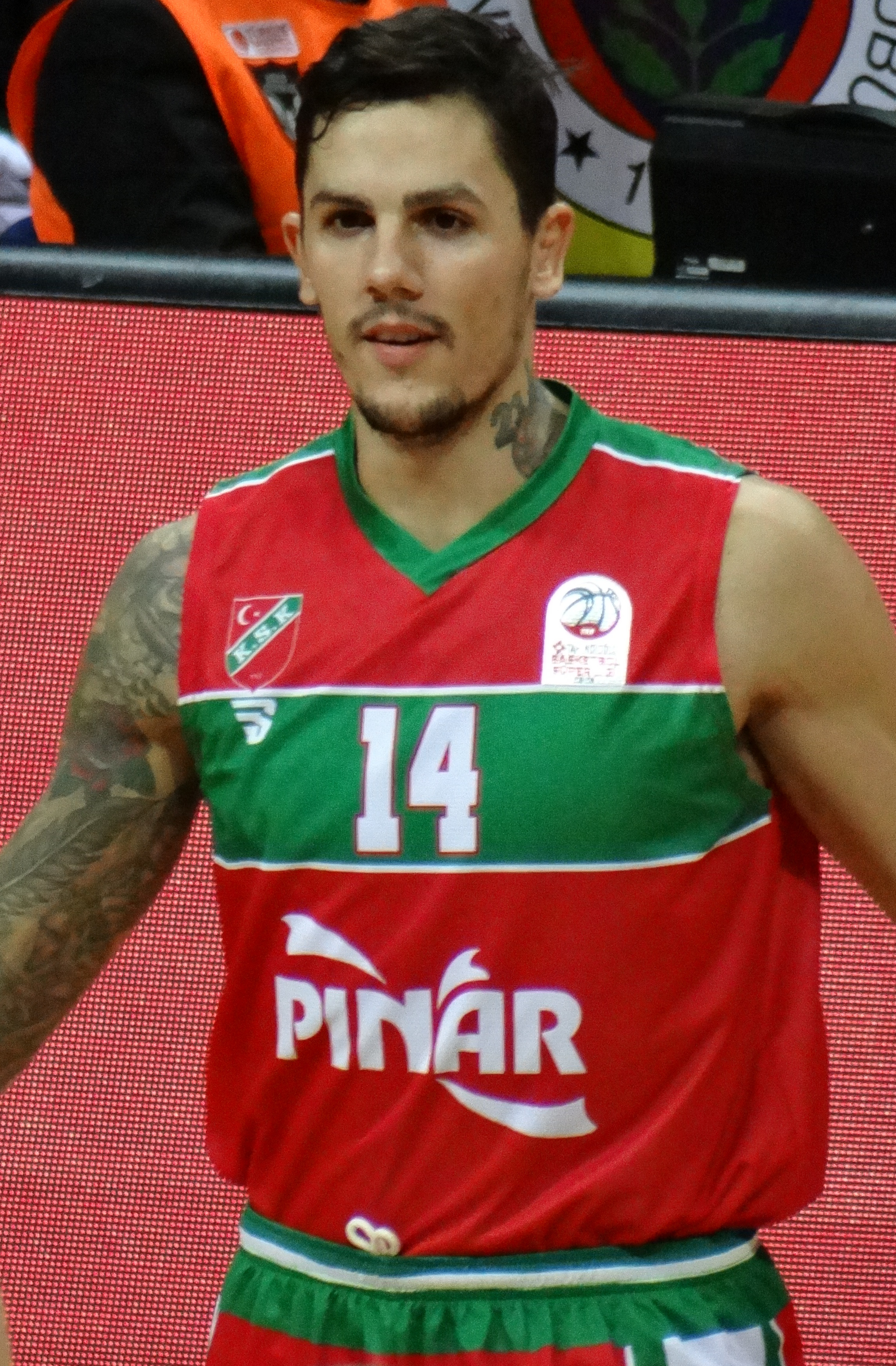
- Karaman in 2018

Personal information
- Born: May 13, 1990; Çerkezköy, Tekirdağ, Turkey
- Died: September 8, 2024 (aged 34); Datça, Muğla, Turkey
- Listed height: 6 ft 9 in (2.06 m)
- Listed weight: 247 lb (112 kg)

Career information
- NBA draft: 2012: 2nd round, 57th overall pick
- Drafted by: Brooklyn Nets
- Playing career: 2007–2024
- Position: Power forward

Career history
- 2007–2011: Tofaş Bursa
- 2011–2012: Pınar Karşıyaka
- 2012–2014: Fenerbahçe
- 2015–2016: Acıbadem Üniversitesi
- 2016–2017: Beşiktaş
- 2017: İstanbul BB
- 2018: Büyükçekmece
- 2018–2019: Pınar Karşıyaka
- 2019–2020: Cholet
- 2020: Antibes Sharks
- 2021: Petkim Spor
- 2021–2022: Semt77 Yalovaspor
- 2022: Tofaş Bursa
- 2022: Manisa BB
- 2023: Formosa Taishin Dreamers
- 2023–2024: Çayırova Belediyesi

Career highlights
- Turkish League champion (2014); Turkish Cup winner (2013); Turkish President's Cup winner (2013)
- Stats at Basketball Reference

İlkan Karaman (May 13, 1990 – September 8, 2024) was a Turkish professional basketball player.

== Professional career ==
Karaman made his professional debut in the TB2L with Tofaş Bursa during the 2007–08 season. He signed a contract with Pınar Karşıyaka after playing four years for Tofaş Bursa.

On August 17, 2012, Karaman signed a three-year contract with Fenerbahçe. In the 2012–13 season Karaman played in 29 games for Fenerbahçe in the Turkish Basketball League and 22 games in the EuroLeague. In the 2013 off-season he underwent arthroscopic surgery on both knees to relieve chronic patellar tendinitis, which prevented him from playing the following season. On July 1, 2014, he parted ways with Fenerbahçe.

On October 14, 2015, Karaman signed with Acıbadem Üniversitesi of the Turkish Basketball Second League.

On September 1, 2016, he signed with Beşiktaş for the 2016–17 season.

On July 12, 2017, Karaman signed with İstanbul BB. He left Istanbul after appearing in eight league games. On January 16, 2018, he signed with Büyükçekmece.

On November 14, 2019, he signed with Cholet of the LNB Pro A.

On October 20, 2020, he signed with Antibes Sharks of the LNB Pro B.

On January 20, 2021, he signed with Petkim Spor of the Turkish Basketball Super League.

On September 30, 2021, he signed with Semt77 Yalovaspor of the Turkish Basketball Super League.

On June 25, 2022, Karaman signed with Tofaş of the Turkish Basketbol Süper Ligi (BSL) and returned to the club after 11 seasons.

On December 23, 2022, he signed with Manisa BB of the Turkish BSL.

On January 20, 2023, he signed with Formosa Taishin Dreamers of the Taiwanese P. League+ (PLG).

On October 27, 2023, Karaman signed with Çayırova Belediyesi of the TBL.

=== NBA ===
Karaman was selected by the Brooklyn Nets with the 57th pick of the 2012 NBA draft. He became officially the first player drafted by the Nets after their move to Brooklyn (the team acquired two higher picks in exchange for cash after they were selected by other teams). After the draft Nets general manager Billy King stated that the team intended for Karaman to develop his skills while continuing to play in Europe. This process (often referred to as "Euro-stashing") allowed the Nets to retain Karaman's NBA rights without offering him a contract.

On July 10, 2014, Karaman's rights were traded to the Cleveland Cavaliers.

On November 18, 2020, Karaman's draft rights were traded to the Milwaukee Bucks, in exchange for a 2025 second-round draft pick.

== Turkish national team ==
Karaman was a regular Turkish youth national team player. He also played for Turkish national team in the EuroBasket 2013 qualification.

== Death ==
Karaman died on September 8, 2024, in Datça after he was hit by a car driven by a drunk driver. Karaman was 34. Two days later, he was buried in Kapaklı, Tekirdağ.
