= Byron Mullens =

British-American basketball player (born 1989)

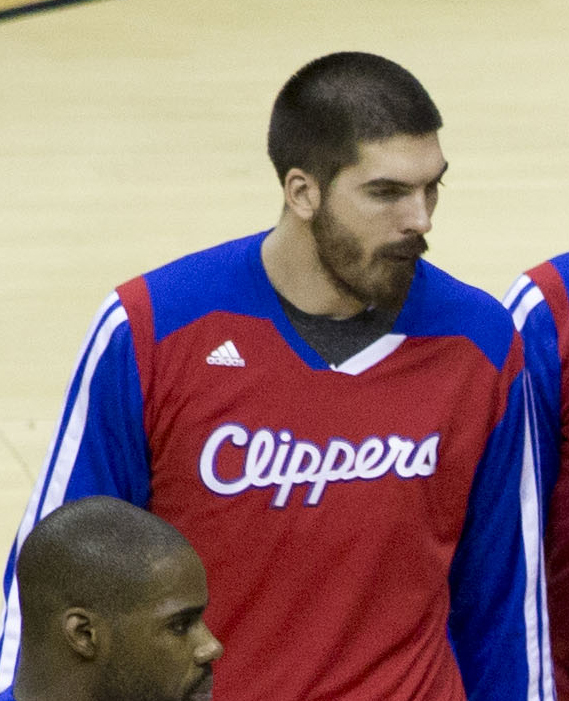
- Mullens with the Los Angeles Clippers in 2013

Free agent
- Position: Power forward / center

Personal information
- Born: February 14, 1989 (age 37) Canal Winchester, Ohio, U.S.
- Listed height: 7 ft 0 in (2.13 m)
- Listed weight: 270 lb (122 kg)

Career information
- High school: Canal Winchester (Canal Winchester, Ohio)
- College: Ohio State (2008–2009)
- NBA draft: 2009: 1st round, 24th overall pick
- Drafted by: Dallas Mavericks
- Playing career: 2009–present

Career history
- 2009–2011: Oklahoma City Thunder
- 2009–2011: Tulsa 66ers
- 2011–2013: Charlotte Bobcats
- 2013–2014: Los Angeles Clippers
- 2014: Philadelphia 76ers
- 2014: Shaanxi Wolves
- 2015–2016: Sioux Falls Skyforce
- 2016: Torku Konyaspor
- 2016–2017: Al Wasl Dubai
- 2017–2018: Sanat Naft Abadan
- 2018: Guangxi Rhinos
- 2018: Lakeland Magic
- 2018–2019: Levanga Hokkaido
- 2019–2020: Busan KT Sonicboom
- 2020: Movistar Estudiantes
- 2020: London Lions
- 2022–2024: New Taipei Kings
- 2024: Winnipeg Sea Bears
- 2024: Taipei Taishin Mars
- 2024: BCH Knights
- 2026: Manawatu Jets

Career highlights
- First-team Parade All-American (2008); McDonald's All-American (2008)
- Stats at NBA.com
- Stats at Basketball Reference

Byron James "B. J." Mullens (born February 14, 1989) is a British-American professional basketball player who last played for the Manawatu Jets of the New Zealand National Basketball League (NZNBL). Born in the United States, he holds British citizenship due to his English mother. He was drafted 24th overall by the Dallas Mavericks and immediately traded to the Oklahoma City Thunder in the 2009 NBA draft.

== High school career ==
Mullens played competitively at Canal Winchester High School and was ranked as one of the top college recruits in the nation from the class of 2008. He was ranked No. 1 in the nation by Rivals.com and No. 3 by Scout.com.

Mullens was offered and accepted a scholarship to Ohio State by the Buckeyes' head basketball coach, Thad Matta, in 2004, which was the summer between Mullens' 8th and 9th grade year.

In his senior year of high school, he averaged 26 points and 15 rebounds, including 29 points and 18 rebounds in his final high school game.

He was a member of the 2008 McDonald's All-American Team and he was a part of the 2008 Jordan Brand Classic at Madison Square Garden, where he had 12 points.

== College career ==
In November 2007, Mullens signed a letter of intent to play basketball at Ohio State University. Mullens averaged 8.8 points a game at a 64.2 shooting percentage during his freshman year with Ohio State. Mullens was named to the Big Ten All-Freshman team and earned the Big Ten's Sixth Man of the Year award. Mullens only played one year for the Buckeyes before declaring eligibility for the NBA draft.

=== College statistics ===
Season	Team	Games	Minutes	Points	FG %	Rebounds	Blocks	Fouls
2008–09	Ohio State Buckeyes	33	20.3	8.8	64.2	4.7	1.1	2.1

== Professional career ==
Coming out of Ohio State, Yahoo! Sports' Rivals 150 projected Mullens to be a clear first round pick in the draft, "Size, athleticism and skill are the big three that separate Mullens from the rest of this class."

Mullens was drafted 24th overall by the Dallas Mavericks in the 2009 NBA draft. His draft rights were traded to the Oklahoma City Thunder for Rodrigue Beaubois, the 25th overall pick, and a future 2nd-round draft pick. In mid-2009, Mullens requested that all media personnel refer to him as "Byron" rather than by his prior nickname "B. J."

During the 2011 NBA lockout, Mullens signed with Panionios B.C. However, he left the team after a month in Greece, saying that he wanted to join his Oklahoma City teammates for their voluntary practice sessions.

On December 19, 2011, Mullens was traded to the Charlotte Bobcats for a 2013 second-round draft pick. In his first game as a Bobcat, Mullens set a new career high with 10 points against the Milwaukee Bucks on December 26, 2011.

Mullens had what appeared to be a breakthrough game against the Atlanta Hawks on January 6, 2012, when he scored 17 points on 8–13 from the floor (.615 FG%), collected five rebounds and had one blocked shot in 24 minutes off the bench.

He made his first career start on January 12, 2012, against the Atlanta Hawks. He played in a career-high 33 minutes, going 8–16 from the floor scoring 21 points and collecting 4 rebounds. On April 6, 2012, Mullens set new career highs by scoring 31 points (on 14–23 shooting) and grabbing 14 rebounds (9 offensive) in 43 minutes against the Milwaukee Bucks.

Entering the 2012–13 season, Mullens played as Charlotte's starting power forward. The acquisition of center Brendan Haywood was part of the decision to play Mullens primarily at power forward instead of center.

On July 22, 2013, Mullens signed with the Los Angeles Clippers.

On February 20, 2014, Mullens was traded, along with a 2018 second-round draft pick, to the Philadelphia 76ers in exchange for a top-55-protected 2014 second-round draft pick.

In July 2014, Mullens joined the Shaanxi Wolves of the Chinese National Basketball League where he played four games for the club. On August 11, 2014, he signed with Shanxi Zhongyu of the Chinese Basketball Association but later left the club before appearing in a game for them.

On February 14, 2015, Mullens was acquired by the Sioux Falls Skyforce of the NBA Development League, and reacquired as a returning player on November 2.

On March 1, 2016, Mullens signed a deal with Turkish club Torku Konyaspor until the end of the 2016–17 season. At the end of the 2015–16 season he left Konyaspor.

In October 2016, Mullens signed with Al Wasl Dubai of the UAE National Basketball League.

In October 2017, Mullens signed with Sanat Naft Abadan of the Iranian Basketball Super League.

On February 22, 2018, the Sioux Falls Skyforce acquired a 2018 second round draft pick from Lakeland Magic for Mullens and Sioux Falls' 2018 fourth round draft pick.

On December 23, 2018, Levanga Hokkaido announced that they had signed Mullens.

He signed with KT Sonicboom of the Korean Basketball League for the 2019–20 season.

On March 2, 2020, he signed with Movistar Estudiantes of the Spanish Liga ACB.

On August 20, 2020, Mullens signed with the London Lions in Great Britain for the 2020–21 BBL season.

On April 1, 2022, Mullens signed with the New Taipei Kings of the P. LEAGUE+.

On May 8, 2024, Mullens signed with the Winnipeg Sea Bears of the Canadian Elite Basketball League. Mullens would be granted his release from the team to "pursue opportunities in the Asian market" on June 28.

On August 30, 2024, Mullens signed with the Taipei Taishin Mars of the Taiwan Professional Basketball League (TPBL). On November 5, his contract was terminated.

In November 2024, Mullens joined the BCH Knights of The League.

In December 2025, Mullens signed with the Manawatu Jets of the New Zealand National Basketball League (NZNBL) for the 2026 season. He was de-registered on April 23, 2026, following an ankle injury, but opted to remain in New Zealand with the team while recovering. He appeared in two games for the Jets.

== NBA career statistics ==
Legend
GP	Games played	GS	Games started	MPG	Minutes per game
FG%	Field goal percentage	3P%	3-point field goal percentage	FT%	Free throw percentage
RPG	Rebounds per game	APG	Assists per game	SPG	Steals per game
BPG	Blocks per game	PPG	Points per game	**Bold**	Career high

=== Regular season ===
Year	Team	GP	GS	MPG	FG%	3P%	FT%	RPG	APG	SPG	BPG	PPG
2009–10	Oklahoma City	13	0	4.2	.368	.000	.000	.8	.1	.2	.0	1.1
2010–11	Oklahoma City	13	0	6.5	.321	.000	.500	1.8	.0	.2	.2	1.9
2011–12	Charlotte	**65**	25	22.5	.425	.235	**.821**	5.0	.9	.3	**.8**	9.3
2012–13	Charlotte	53	**41**	**26.9**	.385	.317	.646	**6.4**	**1.5**	**.6**	.6	**10.6**
2013–14	L.A. Clippers	27	0	6.2	.406	.333	.333	1.2	.2	.2	.1	2.5
2013–14	Philadelphia	18	0	13.7	**.465**	**.400**	.571	3.3	.4	.5	.4	6.8
Career		189	66	18.2	.408	.319	.706	4.2	.8	.4	.5	7.4

=== Playoffs ===
Year	Team	GP	GS	MPG	FG%	3P%	FT%	RPG	APG	SPG	BPG	PPG
2010	Oklahoma City	1	0	4.0	.000	.000	.500	.0	.0	.0	.0	1.0

== International career ==
Mullens was included in the preliminary Great Britain squad for the 2012 Summer Olympics. He left the team in June 2012 due to a toe injury.
