= Huang Hai-tai =

Taiwanese puppeteer

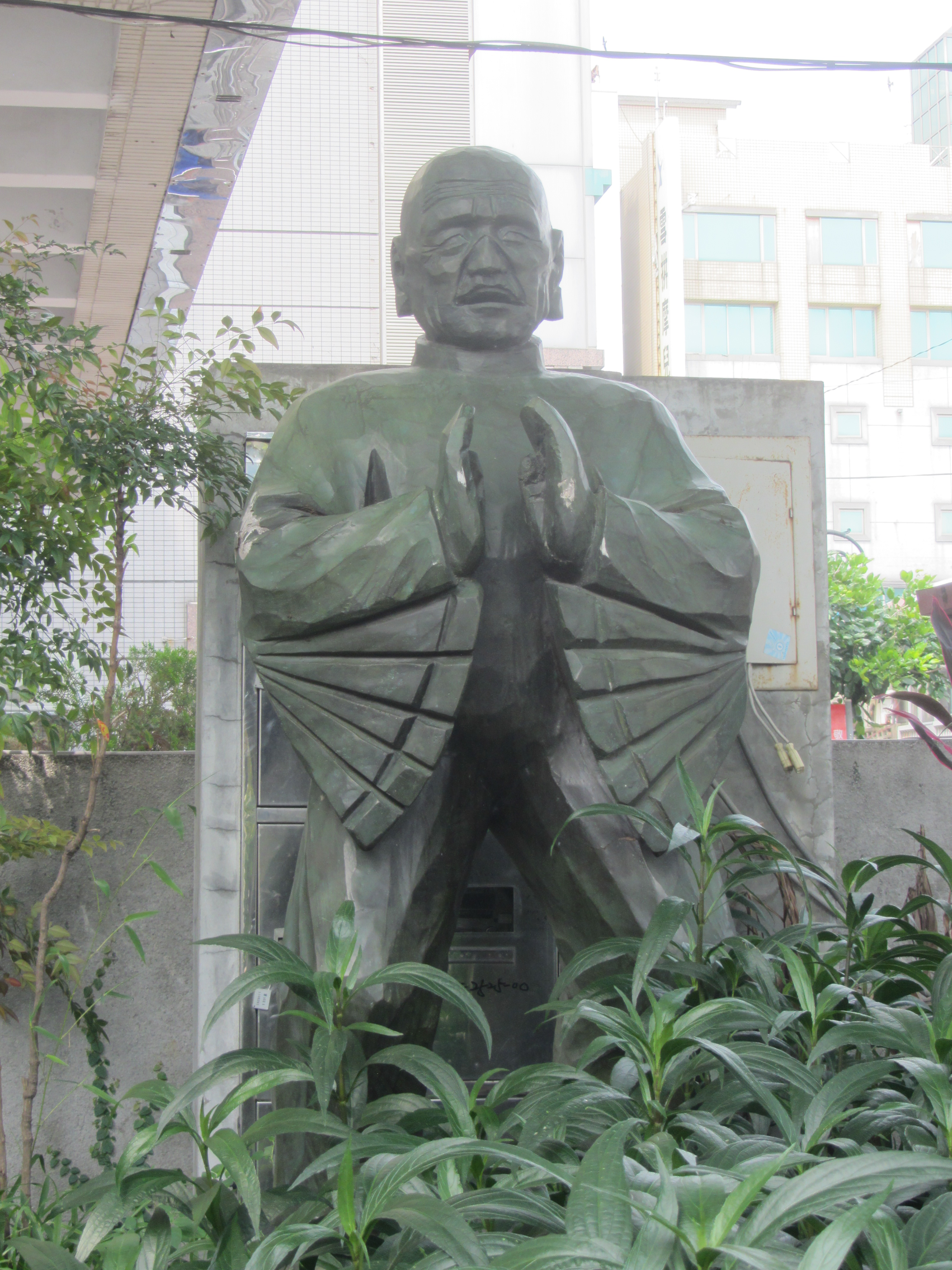
Statue of Huang Hai-tai at the Hand Puppet Museum in Yunlin

Huang Hai-tai (Chinese: 黃海岱; pinyin: Huáng Hǎidài; 2 January 1901 – 11 February 2007) was a Taiwanese puppeteer.

Born on 2 January 1901 in what became Yunlin County, Huang learned the art of puppetry from his father Huang Ma and another puppeteer. He was also trained in beiguan music. Huang renamed his father's troupe Wuzhouyuan, and developed his own stories and characters, most notably Shi Yan-yun. At the start of his career, Taiwan was under Japanese rule, and Huang was limited to public performances that used the Japanese language and portrayed Japanese customs. However, Huang's secretly held private shows told traditional and historic Chinese tales, several of which he had read while in training. Over time, Huang became renowned as a national treasure. As his many students, including second son Huang Chun-hsiung, formed their own theatre troupes in the 1950s, they ushered in the Golden Ray era, dominated by more elaborate shows in an attempt to compete with modernized entertainment mediums, such as comic strips, music, film, and television. Huang was awarded a National Cultural Award in 2000, a National Award for Arts in 2002, and presented with a presidential citation for lifetime achievement in 2004. Later that year, Huang's fifth son, Huang Feng-shih was named to the Legislative Yuan.

Huang fell ill with pneumonia, and died of heart failure on 11 February 2007 in Huwei, Yunlin, aged 106. President Chen Shui-bian was one of thousands to attend Huang's funeral. He was posthumously featured on a Discovery Channel documentary series, Portrait: Taiwan, in November 2007. Some of Huang's sons and grandsons have also become puppeteers and have added multiple special effects to the shows. The traditional performances have been animated, made into films, and released on YouTube. An exhibition commemorating Huang was held at the Yunlin Hand Puppet Museum in January 2017.
