= Huang Chun-hsiung =

Taiwanese puppeteer (born 1933)

- 黃俊雄
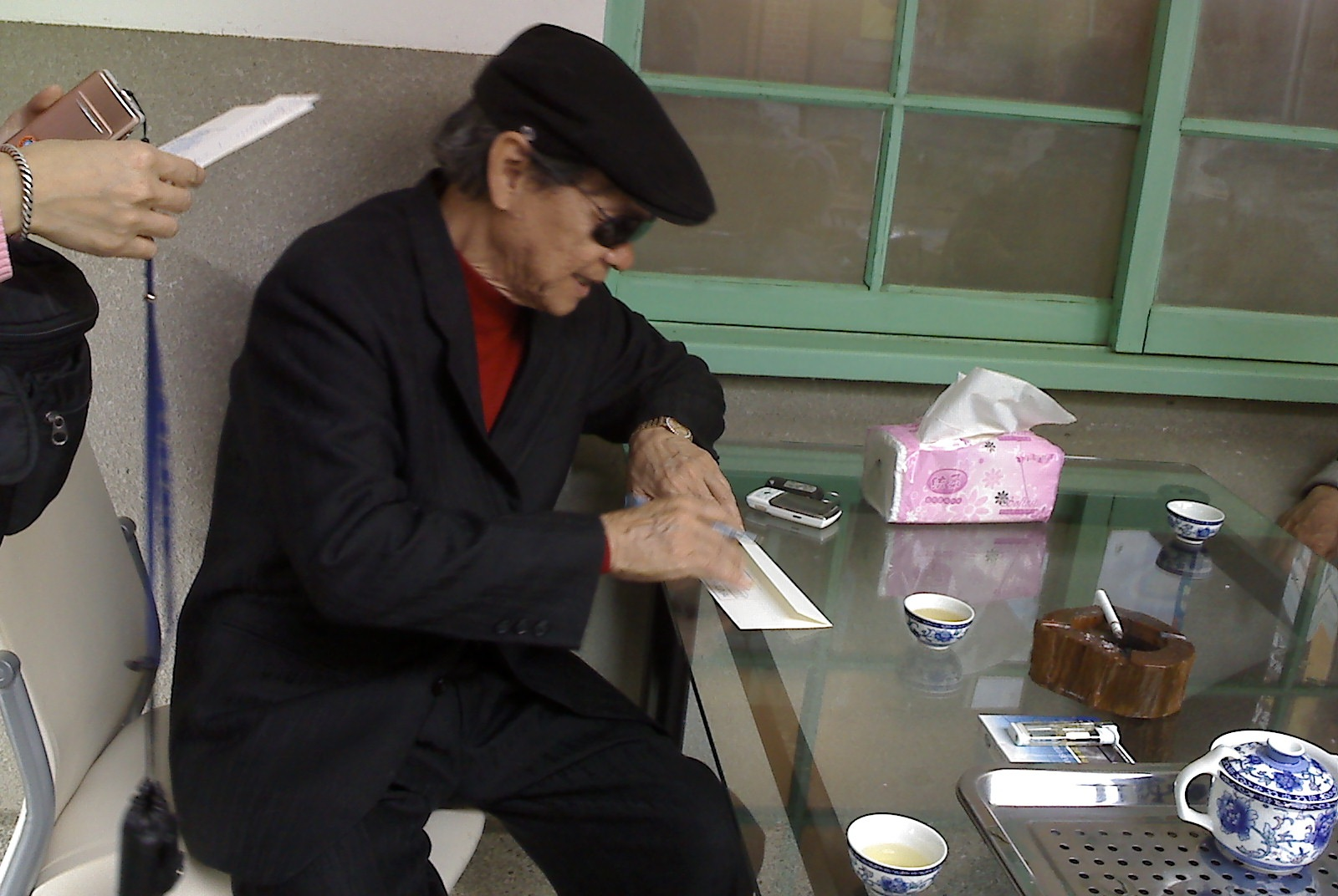
- Huang in the Tiger Tail Puppet Theater
- Born: January 26, 1933 (age 93); Huwei, Yunlin, Taiwan
- Occupations: Glove puppeteer, narrator, producer

Huang Chun-hsiung (Chinese: 黃俊雄; born January 26, 1933, in Huwei, Yunlin, Taiwan) is a glove puppeteer, narrator, and producer. He is the second son of the puppeteer Huang Hai-tai. Chun-hsiung learned how to play glove puppets from his father at the age of fourteen.

== Journey to becoming a glove puppeteer ==
Huang began his career in glove puppetry behind the scenes. Gradually, he learned the five major techniques: to blow (the suona: a Chinese musical instrument like treble horn), to beat (the gong and drum), to play (the erhu, a Chinese fiddle-like violin), to operate (glove puppets), to write (screen), and to narrate. He is also a lyricist and composer. His works include a number of theme music such as "A Bitter-fated Sea Goddess", "A Lady Named Leng Shuangzi", "Acacia Lamp" and "The Turning Point of Fate".

When Huang was 19, he established the third organization under WuChou Theater, which was later renamed the Authentic WuChou Glove Puppet Theatrical Group. The Knight in YunChou - Si Yeng-weng, premiered on March 2, 1970, was the production during this era. In the drama, he enlarged the size of glove puppet, emphasized the eye gestures, and used modern folk songs to replace the traditional music composed of gongs and drums. This drama lasted 583 episodes and created record high television ratings of 97% in 1970.

In 2023, Huang was one of three winners of the National Cultural Award, alongside Wu Jing-jyi and Li Shu-de.

== Personal life ==
Huang's sons from previous marriage, Huang Chiang-hua, Huang Wen-je, and Huang Wen-yao carried on the family business in late 1990s. Later on, Chiang-hua and Wen-je established their own glove puppet production company named "Pili Recording Company" (renamed as Pili International Multi-media Co. Ltd in 2000). Huang, accompanied by Huang Li-gang and Huang Feng-yi – his son and daughter from his second marriage, continued to manage a new production company called "JinKwang Glove Puppet Production". The main characters remained as Si Yeng-weng and "The man hidden behind Mirror".

Although his sons and daughters from two marriages have their separate glove puppetry groups, they worked together to support the eighteenth anniversary of the Yunlin County Puppet Festival in 2020. The premiere took place at HuWei Highspeed Railway station on October 2, 2020.

Huang Chun-hsiung's twin sons Wen-yao and Wen-je died in 2022 on February 6 and 12 June, respectively.
