= Lee Ho-shun =

Taiwanese politician

Lee Ho-shun MLY
- 李和順
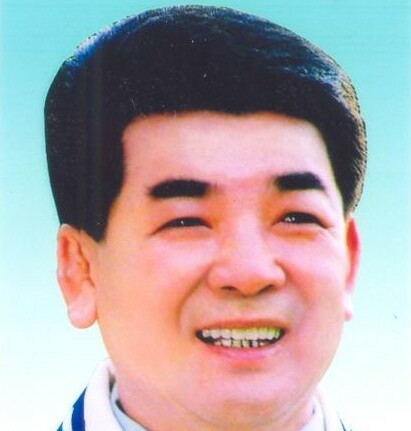

Member of the Legislative Yuan
- In office 1 February 2005 – 31 January 2008
- Constituency: Tainan
- In office 1 February 2002 – 18 October 2004
- Succeeded by: Huang Feng-shih
- Constituency: Republic of China

Personal details
- Born: 22 June 1952 (age 73) Tainan County, Taiwan
- Party: Non-Partisan Solidarity Union (since 2004); Kuomintang (until 2004)
- Education: CTBC University of Technology (BS); Pacific Western University (MBA)

Lee Ho-shun (Chinese: 李和順; pinyin: Lǐ Héshùn; born 22 June 1952) is a Taiwanese politician.

== Education and early career ==
Lee graduated from CTBC University of Technology and earned a Master of Business Administration (M.B.A.) degree from Pacific Western University. He led the Tainan County Sports Federation and the Chinese Taipei Weightlifting Association.

== Political career ==
Between 1998 and 2002, Lee was the speaker of the Tainan County Council. He won election to the fifth Legislative Yuan in 2001 as a Kuomintang candidate. However, he lost a party primary in 2004, and chose to launch an independent reelection bid. Lee quit the Kuomintang on 2 October 2004, and yielded his legislative seat to Huang Fung-shih sixteen days later. Lee joined the Non-Partisan Solidarity Union, and was reelected to the Sixth Legislative Yuan. During his second legislative term, the Taipei Society was critical of Lee's performance. He lost to Democratic Progressive Party candidate Huang Wei-cher in 2008.
