= Shien-Ta Su =

Taiwanese violinist

- 蘇顯達
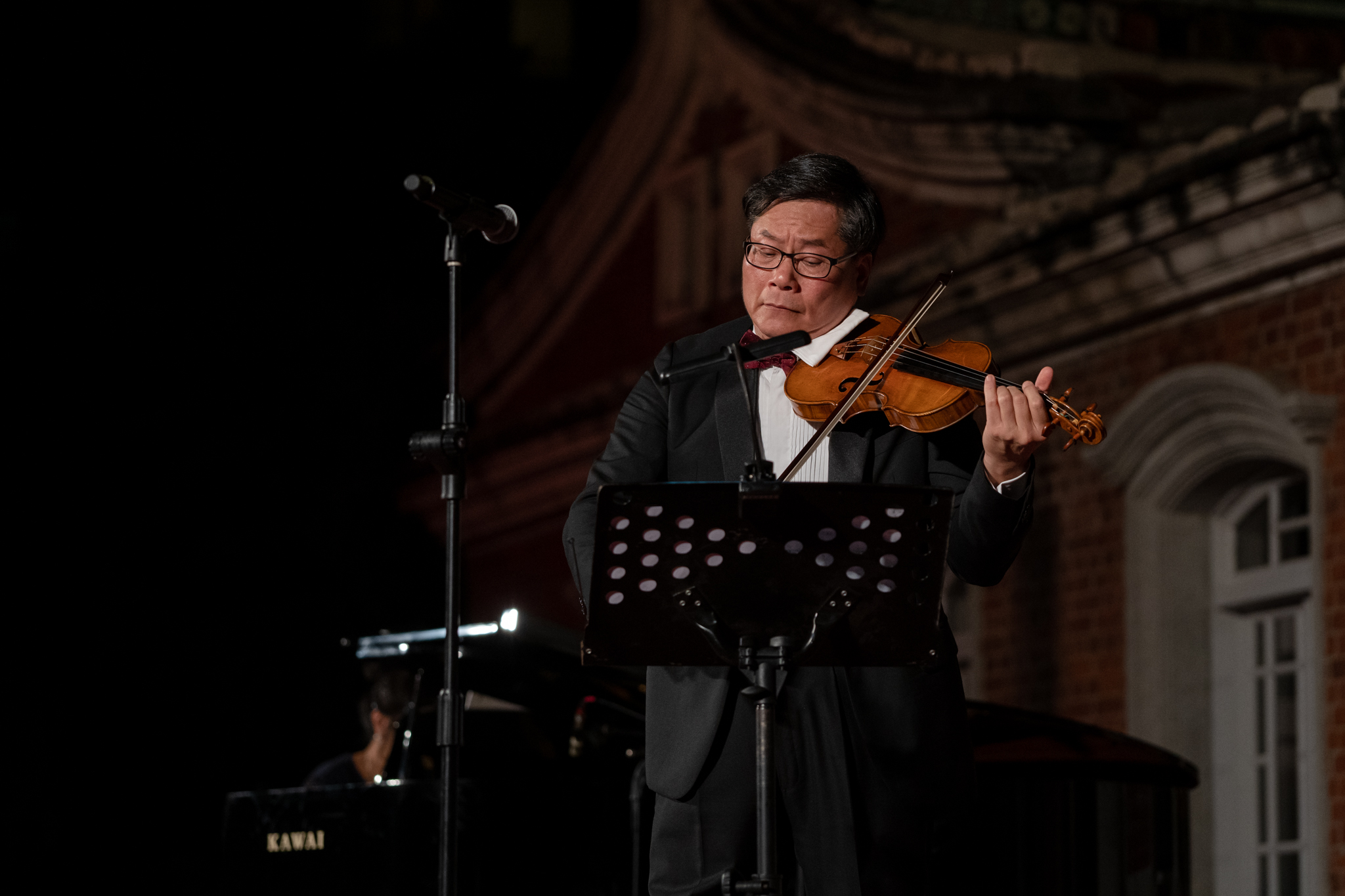
- Born: May 7, 1957 (age 68); Shanhua Township, Tainan County, Taiwan
- Education: Soochow University (Taipei); École Normale de Musique de Paris
- Occupations: Violinist; violin professor
- Years active: 1986–present

Daniel Shien-Ta Su (Chinese: 蘇顯達; pinyin: Sū Xiǎndá, born May 7, 1957) is a Taiwanese violinist. After earning his diploma from the École normale de musique de Paris in 1985, he returned to Taiwan to engage in both performing and teaching. He currently teaches at Taipei National University of the Arts and National Taiwan Normal University, and he serves as the Dean of the College of Music at Taipei National University of the Arts. In 2002 he received the Best Performance Award at the 13th Golden Melody Awards.

== Early years and education ==
Shien-Ta Su was born in 1957 in Shan-Hua District, Tainan City, Taiwan. His father, Che-Fu Su (Chinese: 蘇哲夫), worked at Taiwan Business Bank. At his mother's insistence, all four siblings in the family learned to play musical instruments, but only Shien-Ta Su pursued a career in music. He began his musical journey at the age of five when he received guidance from his uncle, Te-Chien Su (Chinese: 蘇德潛). In the fourth grade of elementary school, Shien-Ta Su joined the 3B Children's Orchestra founded by Chao-Ming Cheng Chinese: 鄭昭明). In 1969 he had the opportunity to perform in diplomatic and goodwill visits with the orchestra, including a performance at the opening of the Cultural Center in Manila, the Philippines.

After studying with Chao-Ming Cheng for a period, Shien-Ta Su felt that his progress was limited. He decided to switch to learning under Shu-De Li (Chinese: 李淑德), where he developed a solid foundation through her rigorous training. In the third year of junior high, he temporarily paused his violin studies due to academic reasons. He resumed playing in high school and, every other Saturday, commuted to Taipei for lessons under the guidance of Chiu-Sen Chen (Chinese: 陳秋盛). Despite facing opposition from his parents, he managed to gain admission to Soochow University's music department. In his junior year, he was invited to perform with the Taipei Philharmonic Symphony Orchestra under the baton of conductor Helen Quach (Chinese: 郭美貞). He successfully completed his university studies in 1980, graduating at the top of his class.

In 1982, after completing his mandatory military service, Shien-Ta Su received a scholarship to study in France. There, he was under the tutelage of renowned violinists Henryk Szeryng and Gérard Poulet. In 1985 he earned the Diplôme supérieur de Concertiste de violon et Musique de chambre from the École normale de musique de Paris Alfred Cortot. During his study abroad, Shien-Ta Su faced various challenges, including language barriers, differences in musical concepts, and stringent performance requirements. His initial struggles were significant, to the point that he did not pass his first-year exams.

After returning to Taiwan and getting married, Shien-Ta Su decided to pursue further studies in France. He dedicated himself to rigorous practice and, on his second attempt, managed to excel in his studies. He received multiple Alfred Cortot scholarships and became the principal violinist in the school's orchestra. Moreover, he earned a place in the Orchestre des Concerts Lamoureux, making him the first non-French and East Asian musician to join the orchestra. This marked a significant achievement in his career.

== Career ==
=== Performance ===
In 1986 Shien-Ta Su held a solo concert tour in southern France. In 1989 he performed as a soloist in the Taiwan premiere of "The Butterfly Lovers Violin Concerto". In 1990 he shared the stage with Cho-Liang Lin (Chinese: 林昭亮), and their concert gained attention for featuring two Stradivarius violins.

Since 1986, he has been the concertmaster of the Taipei Philharmonic Orchestra, and since 2020, he has served as its artistic director. After returning to Taiwan from France, Shien-Ta Su established a tradition of holding solo concert tours in Taiwan every five years.

=== Teaching ===
In 1986 Shien-Ta Su returned to Taiwan to teach, at the invitation of Shui-Long Ma, who was the Department Chair of Music at Taipei National University of the Arts at the time. He served as the Department Chair from 2007 to 2013 and is currently the Dean of the College of Music at the same university. Additionally, Shien-Ta Su also teaches at National Taiwan Normal University's Department of Music.

== Radio Program ==
- Since 1996, Shien-Ta Su has been hosting and producing "The Enchanting World of Violin" on Philharmonic Radio Taipei.

== Awards ==
- 2016: Wu Sain-lien 39th Art Award (First musician to receive the award in the music category).
- 2005: Rotary Club Centennial "Career Achievement Elite Award".
- 2002: 13th Golden Melody Awards for Best Performing Artist (Album: "A Taiwanese Musical Tapestry").
- 1999: 10th Golden Melody Awards for Best Classical Album (Album: "Tyzen Hsiao Violin Works").
- 1995: Selected as one of the "Ten Outstanding Young Persons of the Republic of China".
- 1991: Awarded the "Cultural Award" by the Governor of California, USA.

== Albums ==
1997: "Golden Duo". 1999: "Tyzen Hsiao Violin Works". 2001: "A Taiwanese Musical Tapestry". 2007: "Violin Favorites III". 2015: "Best Selected by Shien-Ta Su". 2016: "Magnifique musique magique de Daniel Su · Chanson Taïwanais". 2018: "Rêve de Fleurs".

== Autobiography ==
- 2016: "Magnifique musique magique de Daniel Su Shien-Ta" (ISBN 9789869383509)
