= Gilbertus Happart =

Dutch missionary

- Born: Goes, Dutch Republic
- Died: c. 1653; Taiwan
- Spouse: Maria Hoochkamer

Gilbertus Happart (also recorded as Gillis or Gilbert Happart) was a seventeenth-century Dutch missionary to Formosa (now known as Taiwan). He was stationed in the village of Favorlang (modern-day Huwei) and wrote a dictionary of the Favorlang language of the inhabitants.
