= Yunlin Hand Puppet Museum =

Museum in Huwei, Yunlin, Taiwan

- 雲林布袋戲館
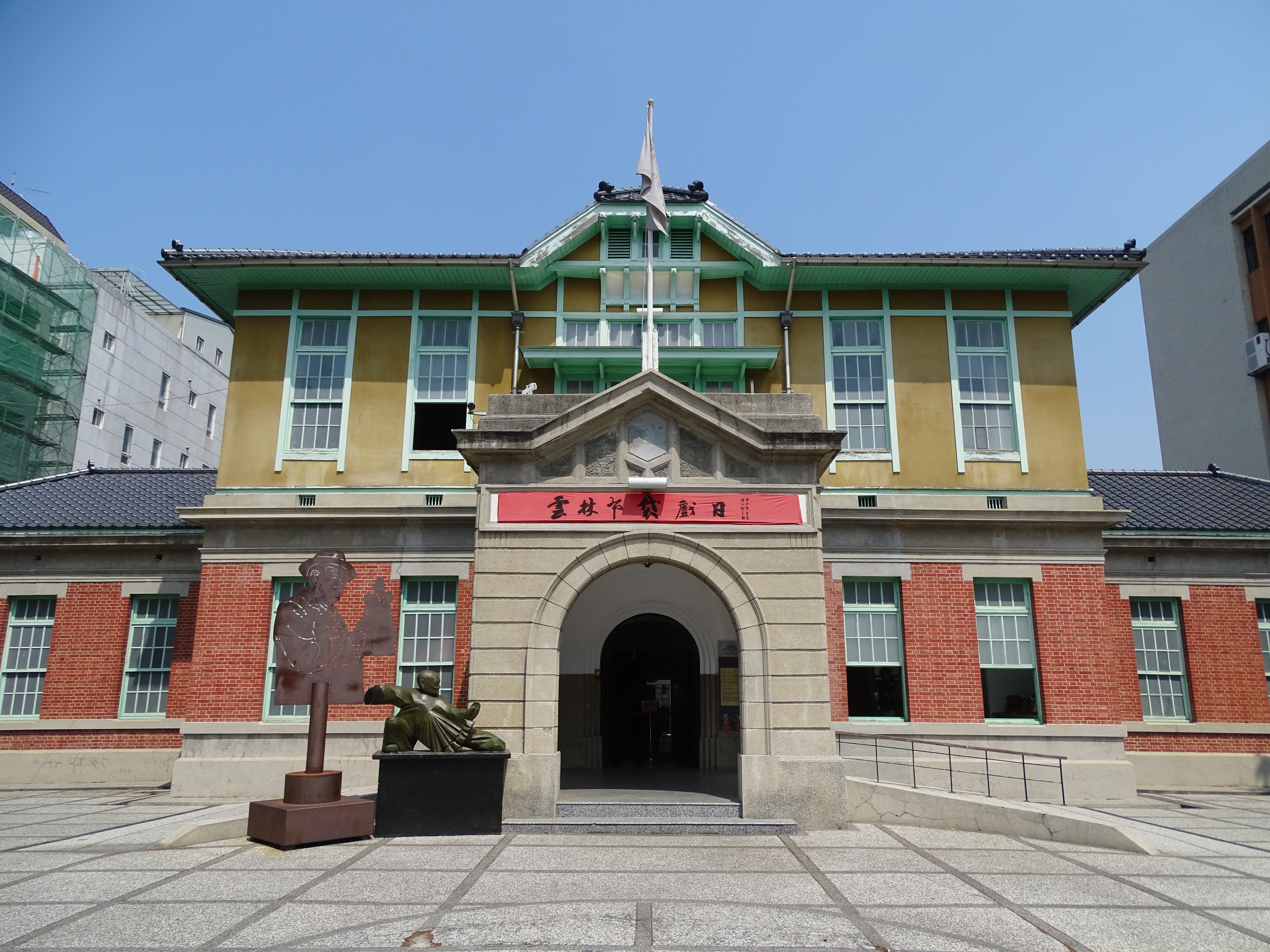
- Established: November 2007
- Location: Huwei, Yunlin, Taiwan
- Coordinates: 23°42′34″N 120°26′00″E
- Type: museum

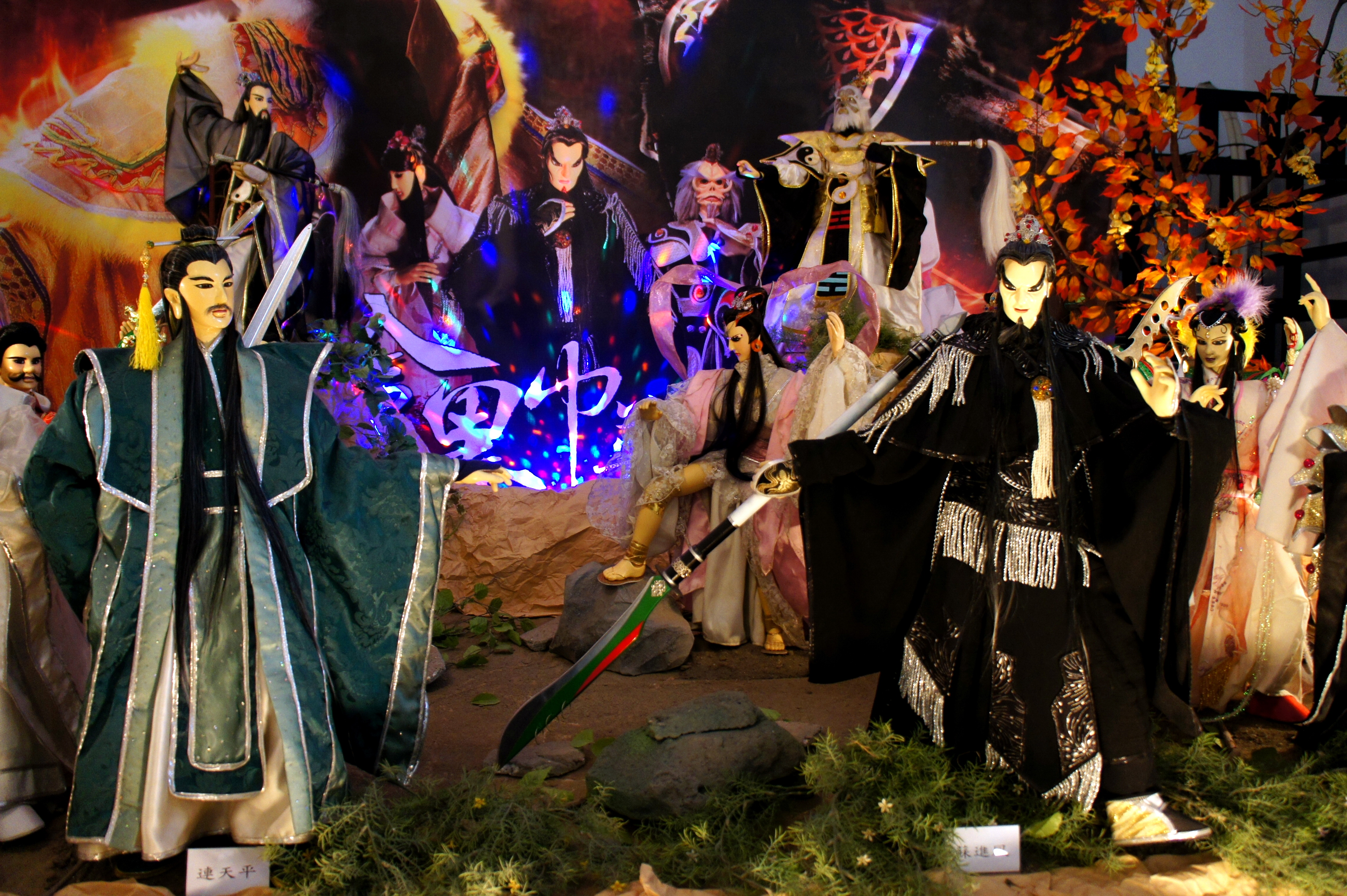
Puppets at Yunlin Hand Puppet Museum.

The Yunlin Hand Puppet Museum (traditional Chinese: 雲林布袋戲館; simplified Chinese: 云林布袋戏馆; pinyin: Yúnlín Bùdài Xìguǎn) is a museum about hand puppets in Huwei Township, Yunlin County, Taiwan.

== History ==
The museum building was initially built in 1931 as the Huwei District office. After the handover of Taiwan from Japan to the Republic of China in 1945, the building was converted into a police station. In 1989, the station was relocated to its new place and the building was left idle for years. In 1997, Huwei Township Office hosted the National Festival of Culture and Arts which made people aware of the historical value of the building. During the preparation of the festival, local government officials discussed the historical value and preservation possibility of the building. In the end, they decided to preserve the building and buildings nearby. Afterwards, Yunlin County Government applied subsidies to Council for Cultural Affairs. In 1999, the county government received NT$20 million of subsidy to restore the building, in which the county government also provided additional NT$8 million.

In early 2000, the county government commissioned National Yunlin University of Science and Technology to make the planning report. Detailed planning and open tender were completed in October of the same year. The restoration work was completed by December 2004. In January 2005, meeting to discuss the building layout and future operational plan was made. In April 2007, the interior design was completed and the museum was officially opened in November the same year. In April 2009, the Yunlin County Culture Foundation took over the management of the museum.

== Architecture ==
The building is a courtyard house with a 2.5-story wooden structure. It is the oldest of such building in Huwei township.

== Exhibitions ==
The museum showcases various sizes and types of hand puppets as well as their history.

== Events ==
The museum regularly holds the annual exhibition of Yunlin International Puppet Festival with the collaboration with Yunlin Story House, organized by the Cultural Affairs Department of Yunlin County government. Other events including puppetry master commemoration, international puppet arts festival etc.

== See also ==
- List of museums in Taiwan
