= Li You-chi =

Taiwanese politician

Li You-chi (Chinese: 李友吉) is a Taiwanese politician.

== Education and career ==
Li graduated from the National Taiwan College of Arts, completing his degree within the department of broadcasting, a division of the School of Communication, and earned a qualification as a social worker. He was affiliated with the Taiwan Confederation of Trade Unions and the Tobacco and Alcohol Trade Union. Li was a member of the Kuomintang who sat on the National Assembly, then represented a functional constituency, laborers, in the Legislative Yuan from 1981 to 1993. After functional constituencies were phased out, Li was reelected to the second and third Legislative Yuan via the Kuomintang party list. He left the legislature on 25 January 1999, to accept an appointment to the Control Yuan. While serving on the Control Yuan, Li proposed in 2000 that the body investigate Wu Chao-feng, the mayor of Zhongliao Township in Nantou, separately from the Nantou District Prosecutors' Office, for misappropriation of supplies provided during the 1999 Jiji earthquake. In early 2001, Li participated in an investigation called to determine the legality of the decision to suspend construction of the Lungmen Nuclear Power Plant. In 2002, Li probed the Ministry of Foreign Affairs for its invitation of the Senegal national football team to Taiwan, as well as policing protocols and scandals involving the National Police Agency and the Taipei City Police Headquarters. Later that year, Li issued a statement of censure against the Department of Health and the Kaohsiung city and county governments for their handling of a dengue fever outbreak. In 2003, Li commented on a tourism program launched by the government in his capacity as a member of the Control Yuan. Li stepped down from the Control Yuan on 31 January 2005.
