= Wen Yi-jen =

Taiwanese classical conductor

- 溫以仁
- Born: 1971 (age 54–55); Taipei, Taiwan
- Education: National Taiwan University of Arts (BFA); Conservatory of Vienna; University of Music and Performing Arts Vienna
- Occupation: Conductor

Wen Yi-jen (Chinese: 溫以仁; pinyin: Wēn Yǐrén) is a Taiwanese classical conductor. He was the Principal Guest Conductor of the National Theatre Belgrade.

== Career ==
=== Early studies ===
Born in Taipei, Taiwan, Wen Yi-jen had his first piano lessons at age six with his mother. He attended the National Taiwan University of Arts, where he studied percussion and piano. He continued his studies at the Konservatorium der Stadt Wien and was awarded that institution's prestigious diploma in operatic, orchestral and choral conducting. His concert performance of excerpts from Richard Strauss's Der Rosenkavalier for his diploma concert elicited praise. He later undertook post-graduate conducting studies at the University of Music and Performing Arts, Vienna. His professors included Reinhard Schwarz, Georg Mark, Kurt Richter and Uros Lajovic.

In Taipei, Wen worked as an assistant conductor with the tenor, Nicola Martinucci, and the Taipei Symphony Orchestra in a 1995 production of Aida. During his student years in Vienna from 1998 to 2003, he performed in productions of Die Entführung aus dem Serail, Così fan tutte, Die Zauberflöte, Don Giovanni, Der Freischütz, Fidelio, Die Fledermaus, Madame Butterfly, Turandot, Tannhäuser, Lohengrin, et al.

As an assistant, his talent was recognized when he was chosen for the final concert at the inaugural “Leif Segerstam Conducting Masterclass” in Germany in 2004. Maestro Leif Segerstam invited Mr. Wen to be his assistant for the premieres of Segerstam's symphonies with the Saint Petersburg Philharmonic Orchestra and the Bruckner Orchestra Linz.

=== National Theatre of Belgrade ===
After Wen's successful debut of La bohème with the renowned vocal artists Boiko Zvetanov (as Rodolfo) and Zvetelina Vassileva (as Mimì) at the National Theatre in Belgrade, he was immediately appointed Principal Guest Conductor. The operas he was scheduled to conduct during his tenure include: Salome, Tosca, La traviata, Don Carlo, Il trovatore, Rigoletto and Carmen. In November 2006, he was invited to guest conduct the New Japan Philharmonic Orchestra and work with the soloist Emmanuel Pahud, Principal Flautist of Berlin Philharmonic Orchestra. For the 2007/08 season, Mr. Wen was invited as a guest conductor for the Saint Petersburg Academic Symphony Orchestra (St. Petersburg Shostakovich Philharmonic Orchestra).

== Conducted orchestras ==
- The National Theatre Belgrade (Serbia & Montenegro)
- Vienna Radio Symphony Orchestra (ORF, Austria)
- Bruckner Symphony Orchestra (Linz, Austria)
- Wuppertal Symphony Orchestra (Germany)
- St. Petersburg Philharmonic Orchestra (Russia)
- Saint Petersburg Academic Symphony Orchestra (Russia)
- New Japan Philharmonic Orchestra (Japan)
- Evergreen Symphony Orchestra (Taipei, Taiwan)
- Arnold Schoenberg Chor (Vienna, Austria)
