= Music and Arts University of the City of Vienna =

University in Austria

Coordinates: 48°12′17″N 16°22′20″E

- Musik und Kunst Privatuniversität der Stadt Wien
- Type: Private university
- Established: 1938
- Vice-Chancellor: Andreas Mailath-Pokorny
- Location: Vienna, Austria
- Website: muk.ac.at/en

The Music and Arts University of the City of Vienna (Musik und Kunst Privatuniversität der Stadt Wien; MUK) in Vienna, Austria, is a university of music and the arts. It was previously (2005−2015) named Konservatorium Wien Privatuniversität (KONSuni, Konservatorium Wien University), and before that Konservatorium Wien (Conservatory of Vienna). It was established in 1938 as Musikschule der Stadt Wien. The school attained university status on 15 June 2005, as a private institution. The university also houses a location of the Viennese café Vollpension.

== Faculty ==
- Linda Watson, American dramatic soprano

== Notable alumni ==
- Miguel del Águila, composer
- Falco, Austrian singer
- Werner Hink, Austrian violinist and concertmaster
- Dino Rešidbegović, Bosnian composer
- Sofie Royer, Austrian-Iranian artist and musician
- Nathan Trent, Austrian singer
- Wen Yi-jen, Taiwanese conductor
- Yat Siu, Hong Kong–based entrepreneur and angel investor
- Joe Zawinul, composer, keyboardist, leader of Weather Report
- Johannes Pietsch singer-songwriter, winner of the Eurovision Song Contest 2025 for Austria with the song Wasted Love.
