= Huang Feng-shih =

Taiwanese politician

Huang Feng-shih MLY
- 黃逢時

Member of the Legislative Yuan
- In office 28 October 2004 – 31 January 2005
- Preceded by: Lee He-shun
- Constituency: Republic of China

Personal details
- Born: 9 December 1949 (age 76)
- Party: Kuomintang
- Parent: Huang Hai-tai (father)
- Education: National Taiwan University of Arts (BFA)

Huang Feng-shih (Chinese: 黃逢時; born 9 December 1949) is a Taiwanese politician.

He is the fifth son of puppeteer Huang Hai-tai. Huang Shih-feng studied film at National Taiwan University of Arts. He was sworn in to the Legislative Yuan on 28 October 2004, replacing Lee Ho-shun, who had resigned.
