= National Taiwan University of Arts =

Art school in New Taipei City, Taiwan

Coordinates: 25.0067°N 121.4488°E

- 國立臺灣藝術大學
- Former names: National School of Arts; National Taiwan Academy of Arts; National Taiwan College of Arts
- Motto: 真善美
- Motto in English: Truth, Goodness, and Beauty
- Type: Public
- Established: October 31, 1955; 70 years ago
- President: Chung Shih-Kai
- Vice-president: Hsu Hsing-Jung
- Undergraduates: 4,949
- Location: New Taipei City, 22058, Taiwan
- Website: www.ntua.edu.tw/en/

National Taiwan University of Arts
- Traditional Chinese: 國立臺灣藝術大學
Transcriptions
Standard Mandarin
- Hanyu Pinyin: Guólì Táiwān Yìshù Dàxué

National Taiwan University of Arts (NTUA; Chinese: 國立臺灣藝術大學; pinyin: Guólì Táiwān Yìshù Dàxué) is a national university in Banqiao District, New Taipei City, Taiwan. It is the oldest art university in Taiwan.

== History ==
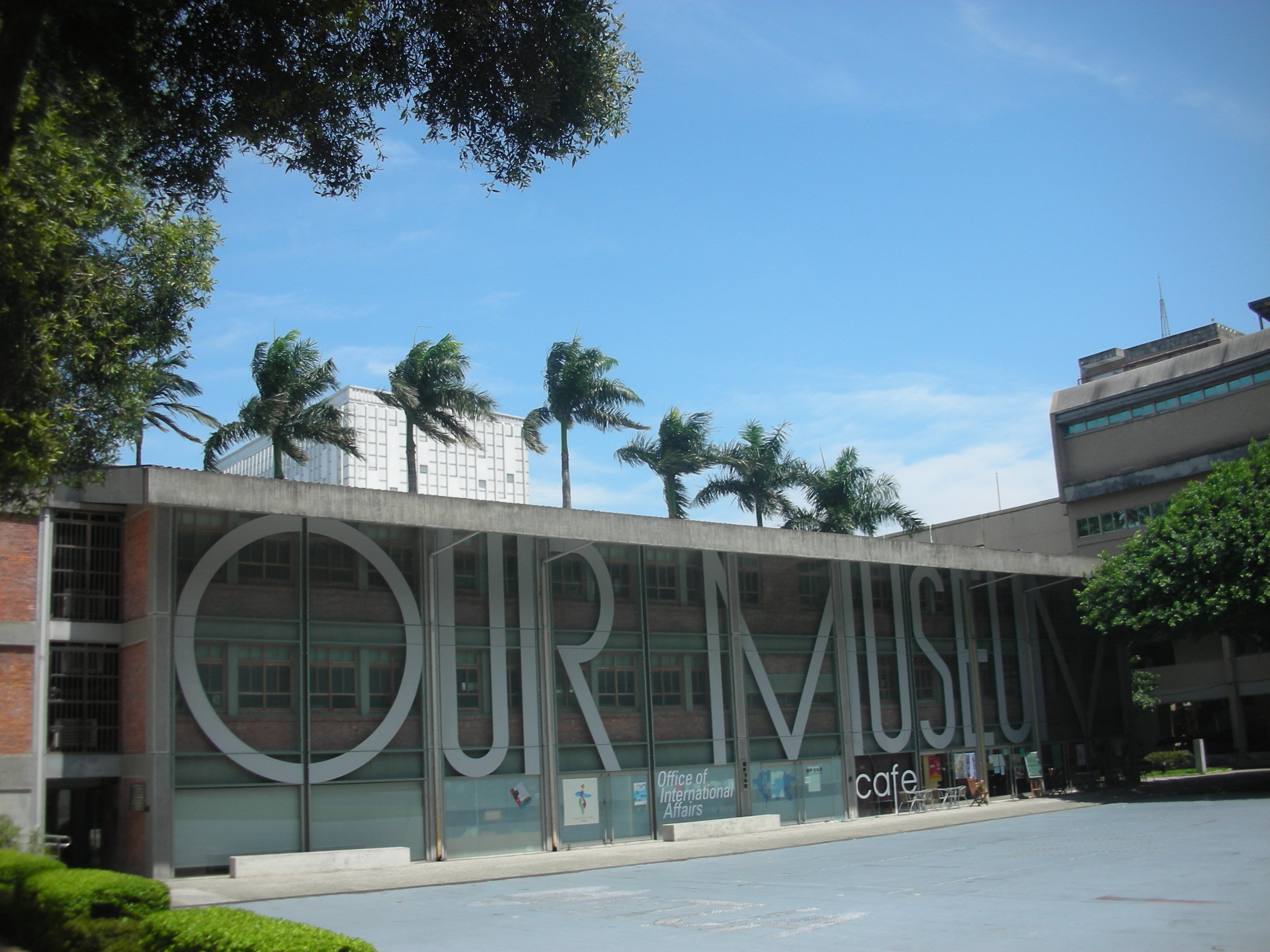
Yo-Chang Art Museum on NTUA campus

National Taiwan University of Arts (NTUA) was established as the National School of Arts on October 31, 1955. In 1960, the name was changed to the National Taiwan Academy of Arts, and then in August 1994 to the National Taiwan College of Arts. The university took on its present name on August 1, 2001. Education at NTUA emphasizes humanistic thinking, creative production, theoretical analysis and hands-on practice. In terms of scope, the university offers courses on the local and the international, the avant garde and the traditional, the creative and the commercial, and the theoretical and the practical.

NTUA comprises five colleges which include the College of Fine Arts, the College of Design, the College of Communications, the College of Performing Arts, and the College of Humanities. In addition to day division undergraduate programs and graduate programs, there are also Extended bachelor's degree Courses (evenings), two-year in-service BA programs, and in-service MA programs. The university employs about 190 staff members, 165 full-time faculty members, and 771 part-time teachers. The university is home to about 5000 students.

== Organization ==
- College of Fine Arts

Department of Fine Arts (Graduate School of Printmaking), Department of Sculpture, Department of Painting and Calligraphy Arts (Graduate School of Plastic Arts), Department of Architecture and Art Conservation.

- College of Design

Department of Visual Communication Design, Department of Crafts and Design, Department of Multimedia and Animation Arts, Graduate School of Creative Industry Design (PhD).

- College of Communication

Department of Motion Picture, Department of Radio and Television (Graduate School of Applied Media Arts), Department of Graphic Communication Arts.

- College of Performing Arts:

Department of Drama (Graduate School of Performing Arts), Department of Music, Department of Chinese Music, Department of Dance, Graduate School of Performing Arts (PhD).

- College of Humanities

General Education Center, Physical Education Center, Teacher Education Center, Graduate School of Arts and Humanities Instruction, Graduate School of Art Management and Culture Policy.

- Bachelor's degree Program of Architectural Space and Culture Relics in Conservation in Asia Pacific

== Research Centers ==
- Historic Object Conservation Research Center (HOCRC)

The center combines traditional techniques and technological restoration concepts, with a focus on the restoration of monuments and decorations to preserve historical relics and represent the beauty of heritage.

- Innovation Center for Art and Technology (ICAT)

The center focuses on the development of cross-disciplinary technological experiments in diversified arts, and aims to create an academic and creative center and international platform for the exhibition and reflection of technological arts.

- Center for Sound Arts and Acoustics Research (CSAAR)

CSAAR aims to explore new possibilities for live performance through current music technology. Our Sound Lab was established in 2021 and has a capacity of 30, includes a 32.4 channel speaker based on (an) ambisonic system array to support experimental work, performances, and exhibitions.

- Research Center for Intangible Cultural Heritage (RCICH)

The center offers hands-on courses to preserve intangible cultural assets, integrate traditional techniques with modern design, and train students to obtain the license for traditional crafts.

- Center for Physical Arts Experimentation (CPAE)

The center offers experimental courses that innovate and develop body movements for students to experience integration, conflicts, and the exchange of kinetic energy presented by cross-art production.

== Notable alumni ==
- Ang Lee, film director and screenwriter
- Ben Wu, singer and actor
- Brenda Wang, actress and model
- Chang Chin-lan, actress
- Chang Hsin-yan, actress
- Cheng Wei-hao, film director and screenwriter
- Chien Wen-pin, conductor
- Collin Chou, actor and martial artist
- Eve Ai, singer and songwriter
- Gua Ah-leh, actress and singer
- Hou Hsiao-hsien, film director, screenwriter, producer and actor
- Huang Feng-shih, member of Legislative Yuan (2004–2005)
- Jacky Wu, actor, singer, and host
- Jake Hsu, actor
- Jay Chou, actor, musician, singer, composer, songwriter and director
- Joanne Tseng, actress, singer and television host
- Kenji Wu, singer and songwriter
- Ko Chun-hsiung, actor, director and politician
- Kuei Chih-Hung, film director and screenwriter
- Li Tai-hsiang, composer and songwriter
- Li You-chi, politician
- Ma Shui-long, composer
- Matt Wu, actor, film director, and screenwriter
- Mou Tun-fei, filmmaker
- River Huang, actor
- Suming, musician, singer, and songwriter
- Tai Chih-yuan, actor and host
- Ting Shan-hsi, film director and screenwriter
- Wei Haimin, opera singer-actress
- Wen Yi-jen, conductor
- Yvonne Yao, actress

== Transportation ==
The university is accessible within walking distance from Fuzhou Station of Taiwan Railway.

== See also ==
- List of universities in Taiwan
