= Shu-De Li =

Taiwanese musician and violin teacher (1929–2014)

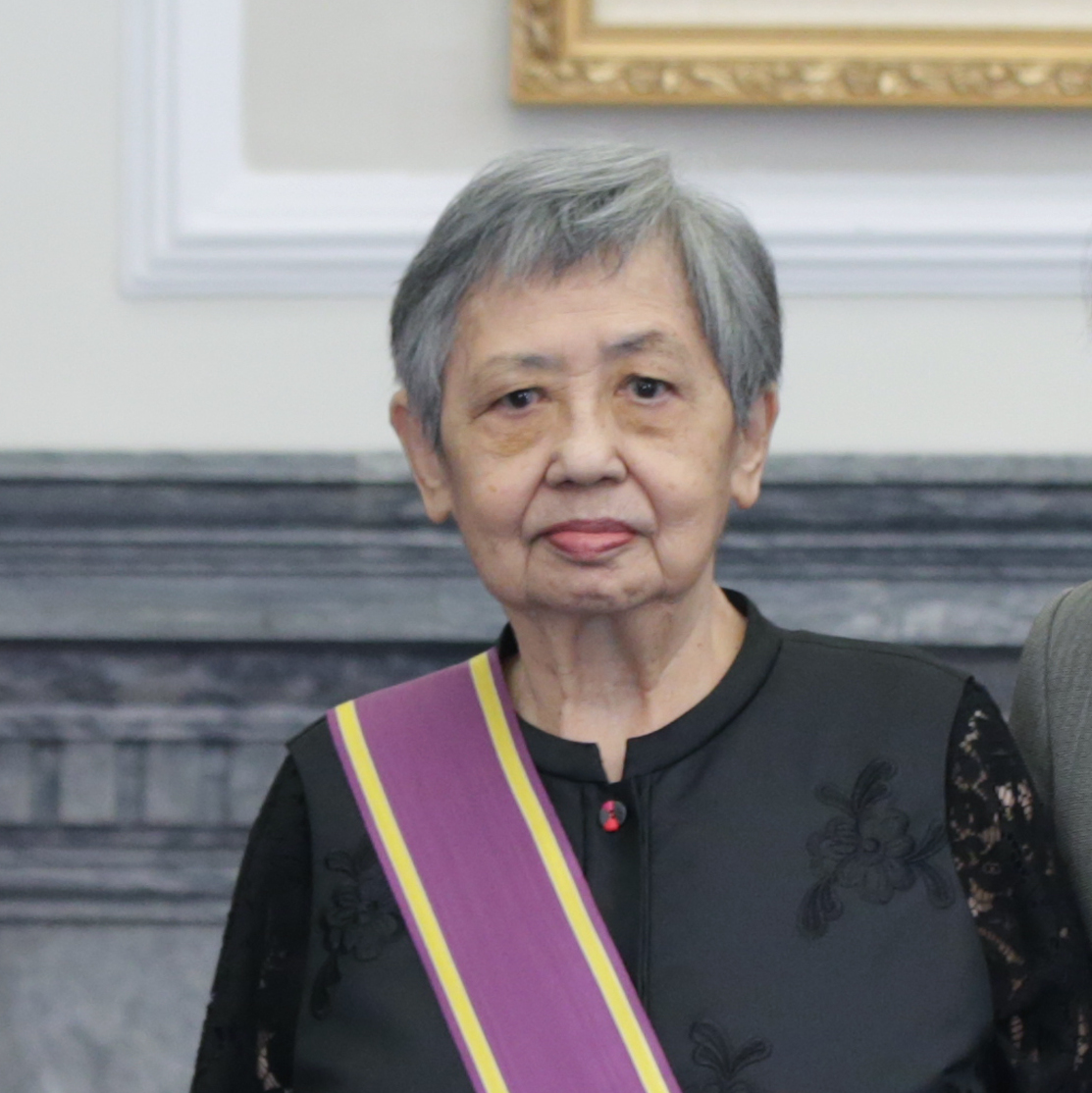
Li Shude

Shu-De Li（English: 李淑德, 1929–）was a Taiwanese music educator and violinist. She graduated from the Department of Music at National Taiwan Normal University. She served as a conductor for various orchestras and earned a reputation as the "Mother of Violin Education in Taiwan" due to her significant contributions to music education in the country.

== Life and career ==
Shu-De Li was born in Pingtung. Her mother played the piano, and her father, who had a strong passion for music, collected numerous musical instruments at home. He often hired Nanguan music ensembles to perform there and even established the Mandolin music ensemble in the local Pingtung area. Shu-De Li was greatly influenced by the musical environment within her family from a young age, developing a profound interest in music. In 1948 she enrolled in the Department of Arts at National Taiwan Normal University. In 1949, due to the "April 6 student uprising (English: 四六學潮)", the school suspended classes for a month. After classes resumed, many students chose not to continue their education. However, Shu-De Li transferred to the Department of Music, where she studied violin under the guidance of Professor Cui-Lun Dai (English: 戴粹倫). She became a member of the first graduating class of the Department of Music at National Taiwan Normal University. Shu-De Li was born in Pingtung. Her mother played the piano, and her father, who had a strong passion for music, collected numerous musical instruments at home.

In 1957 she went to the United States to study at the New England Conservatory of Music in Boston. During the application process, when asked about her future goals, Shu-De Li, recognizing that she had a later start compared to others and might not easily become a performer, replied, "I aspire to be an excellent teacher." After admission, she studied the violin with Alfred Krips and Ruth Posselt, ultimately obtaining her master's degree in violin music in 1964.

After returning to Taiwan upon her graduation, Shu-De Li devoted herself to violin music education. She served as a teacher at Tainan Theological College and Seminary and at the National Taiwan Normal University's Department of Music. She also conducted teaching tours across Taiwan, educating students such as Cho-liang Lin (Chinese: 林昭亮), Nai-Yuan Hu (Chinese: 胡乃元), Shien-Ta Su (Chinese: 蘇顯達), and others. In 1971, Shu-De Li founded the "Chinese Youth Chamber Orchestra" and served as the group's leader, coach and conductor. Apart from occasionally inviting guest conductors to guide the orchestra, she also established training classes in Tainan to train future members and organized summer training camps. In 1976, the Chinese Youth Chamber Orchestra, under the name of the "Chinese Youth Chamber Orchestra of the Republic of China", embarked on a tour to the United States to celebrate the American Bicentennial.

In 2017 Shu-De Li was awarded posthumously the "Order of Brilliant Star with Grand Cordon" by the president of the Republic of China in recognition of her contributions to music education in Taiwan. Following this, during the "Reflections from the Far South: The 2017 Concert of the Presidential Office" held in Pingtung, a segment of the performance was dedicated to Shu-De Li to convey her contributions to violin education in Taiwan.
