= Favorlang language =

Extinct Formosan language

Favorlang
- Favor-Langsch
- Native to: Taiwan
- Era: attested mid-17th century may have developed into Babuza
- Language family: Austronesian: Western Plains Formosan; Central; Favorlang

Language codes
- ISO 639-3: bzg (with Babuza)
- Glottolog: favo1235
- Linguasphere: 30-CBC-ab
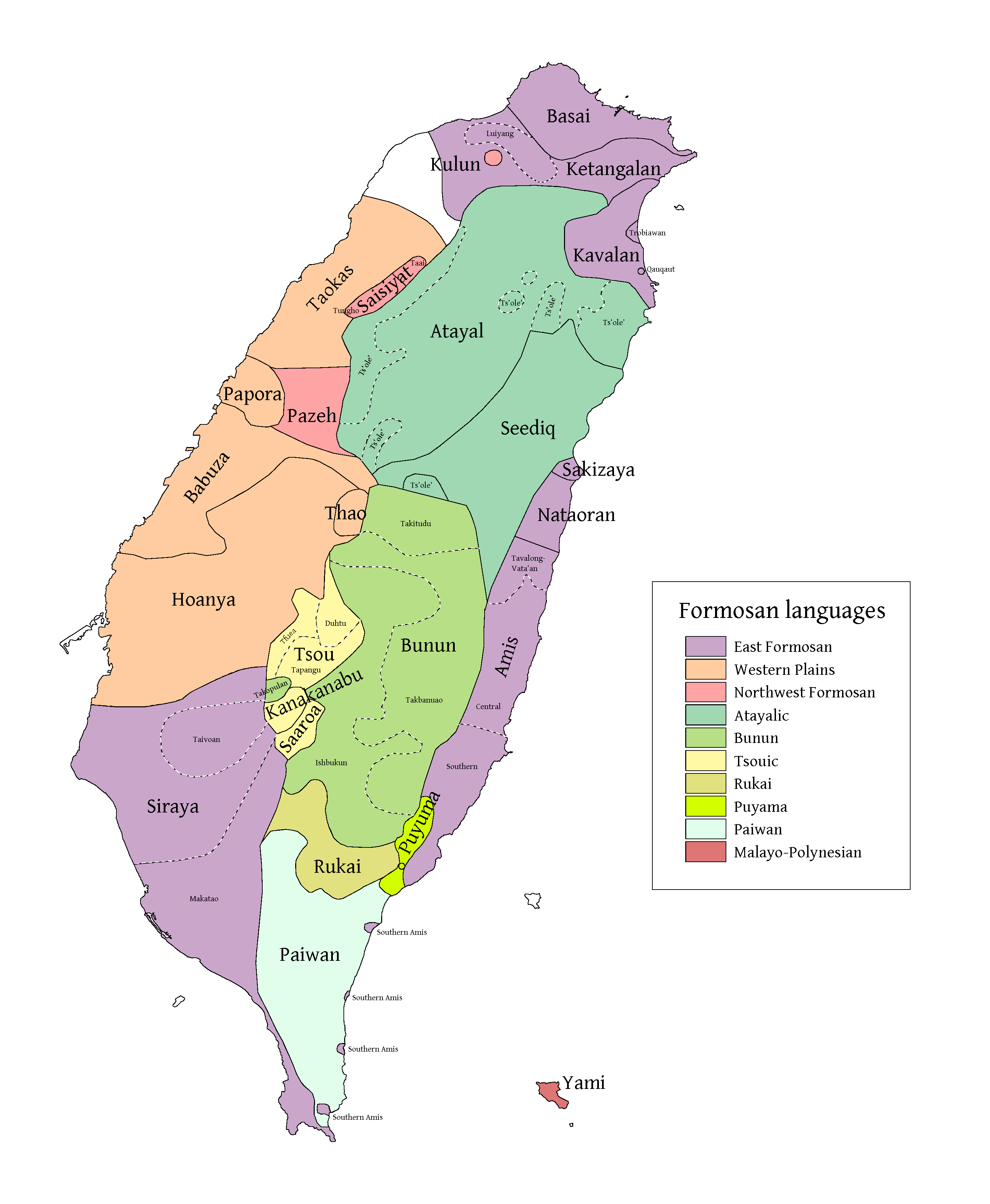
- Distribution of Formosan languages prior to Chinese colonisation

Favorlang is an extinct Formosan language closely related to Babuza. Although Favorlang is considered by Taiwanese linguist Paul Jen-kuei Li to be a separate language, it is nevertheless very closely related to Babuza. In fact, the name Favorlang is derived from Babuza. Alternatively, Favorlang may also have represented a dialect of Babuza at an earlier stage, since Favorlang was documented in the mid-17th century, while Babuza was documented only around the turn of the 20th century by Japanese linguists.

== Phonology ==
Favorlang has gone through the following sound changes. Except for the *t, *s, *Z > /t/ merger, all of these sound changes are shared by the five Western Plains languages Taokas, Babuza, Papora, Hoanya, and Thao.

1. Merger of PAn *n and *ŋ as /n/
2. Merger of *t, *s, *Z as /t/
3. Merger of *N and *S_{1} as /s/
4. Complete loss of *k, *q, *H
5. Partial loss of *R, *j, including the loss of final *-y and *-w
6. *s (in initial and medial positions) > /t/

== Sources ==
Favorlang data sources are:

- Happart, Gilbertus (1650). Woorden boek der Favorlangsche Taal [Favorlang Vocabulary] (in Dutch). Later translated into English:
  - Happart, Gilbertus (1840) [1650]. Written at Batavia. Dictionary of the Favorlang Dialect of the Formosan language. Translated by Medhurst, W. H. Parapattan.
- 5 sermons and various prayers, questions, and answers on Christianity by Jacobus Vertrecht (1647–1651), a Dutch pastor
- Word lists collected by Naoyoshi Ogawa in the early 1900s (unpublished manuscripts dated 1900, 1901, and 1930; others are undated)
  - Notebooks 1, 2, 3, and 5, now kept by ILCAA (Research Institute for Languages and Cultures of Asia and Africa) and TUFS (Tokyo University of Foreign Studies) – call number "OA052"
  - Notebook 4, now kept at the Anthropological Institute, Nanzan University – call number "v. 1-2-1"

== Syntax ==
Case markers include:

- ja 'nominative marker'
- ta 'personal name marker'
- o, no 'oblique (genitive and accusative, common noun)'
- i 'oblique (personal noun)'
- de 'locative'
- i 'directional'

Agent-focus verbal affixes include:

Agent-focus

- -um- ~ -umm- (after consonant-initial verb stems) or um- ~ umm- (before vowel-initial verb stem except i-)
- -im-, -em- (lexically conditioned)
- m-
- p-

Past tense (AF)

- -in-umm-, in-umm
- m-in-
- -in-

Future tense (AF)

- Reduplication of the first stem syllable

Imperative (AF)

- -a

Non-agent-focus verbal affixes are:

- -an 'locative focus'
- -en, -in, -n 'patient focus'
- ipa- ... -a 'imperative (non-agent-focus)'
- -in-, in- 'past tense (non-agent-focus)'
- ino- 'future tense (non-agent-focus)'

When -in- and -umm- appear together in a word, -in- usually precedes -um- ~ -umm-, as in Ilokano, Bontok, and some Dusunic languages in Sabah (Rungus Dusun and Kimaragang Dusun). Occasionally, -umm- precedes -in- in several Favorlang lexical forms, but this is not very common.

== Pronouns ==
All of the following personal pronouns are free forms. All genitive pronouns end with -a.

Favorlang Personal Pronouns
Type of Pronoun	Neutral	Genitive	Nominative/Accusative
1s.	ka-ina	na-a	ina
2s.	ijonoë	joa, oa	ijo
3s.	icho	choa	icho
1p. (incl.)	torro	torroa	–
1p. (excl.)	namono	namoa	namo
2p.	imonoë	imoa	imo
3p.	aicho-es dechonoë	choa	decho

== Examples ==
Favorlang	Translation
Namoa tamau tamasea paga de boesum, ipa-dass-a joa naan.	Our father, which art in Heaven, let Thy Name be praised!
Ka-ina paga ta Jehova oa Deosoe, tamasea pina-ijor ijo....	I am the Lord, thy God, who led thee....

The Lord's Prayer

Namoa tamau tamasea paḡa de boesum,
Ipádassa joa naan.
Ipáṣaija joa chachimit o ai.
Ipa-i-jorr'o oa airab maibas de boesum, masini de ta channumma.
Epé-e namo-no pia-dai torro uppo ma-atsikap.
Ṣo-o abó-e namo tataap o kakossi namoa,
maibas channumma namo mabo tamasea parapies i namo.
Hai pásabas i namo, ṣo-o barra'i namo innai rapies ai.
Inau joa micho chachimit o ai, ṣo-o barr'o ai, ṣo-o adas ai, taulaulan,
Amen.

== Bibliography ==
- Li, Paul Jen-kuei (2003). "Introduction: Notes on Favorlang, an Extinct Formosan language". In Ogawa, Naoyoshi (ed.). English-Favorlang Vocabulary. Tokyo: Research Institute for Languages and Cultures of Asia and Africa. pp. 1–13. ISBN 4872978536.
- Li, Paul Jen-kuei (2019). Text Analysis of Favorlang. Language and Linguistics Monograph Series 61. Taipei: Academia Sinica. ISBN 978-986-05-8008-2.
- Ogawa, Naoyoshi (2003). English-Favorlang vocabulary. Tokyo: Research Institute for Languages and Cultures of Asia and Africa. ISBN 4872978536.
- Marsh, Mikell Alan (1977). Favorlang-Pazeh-Saisiat: A Putative Formosan Subgroup (Ph.D. dissertation). Washington State University. OCLC 224303389.
