= Yunlin Story House =

Historic house in Huwei, Yunlin, Taiwan

Coordinates: 23°42′33″N 120°25′58″E

- 雲林故事館
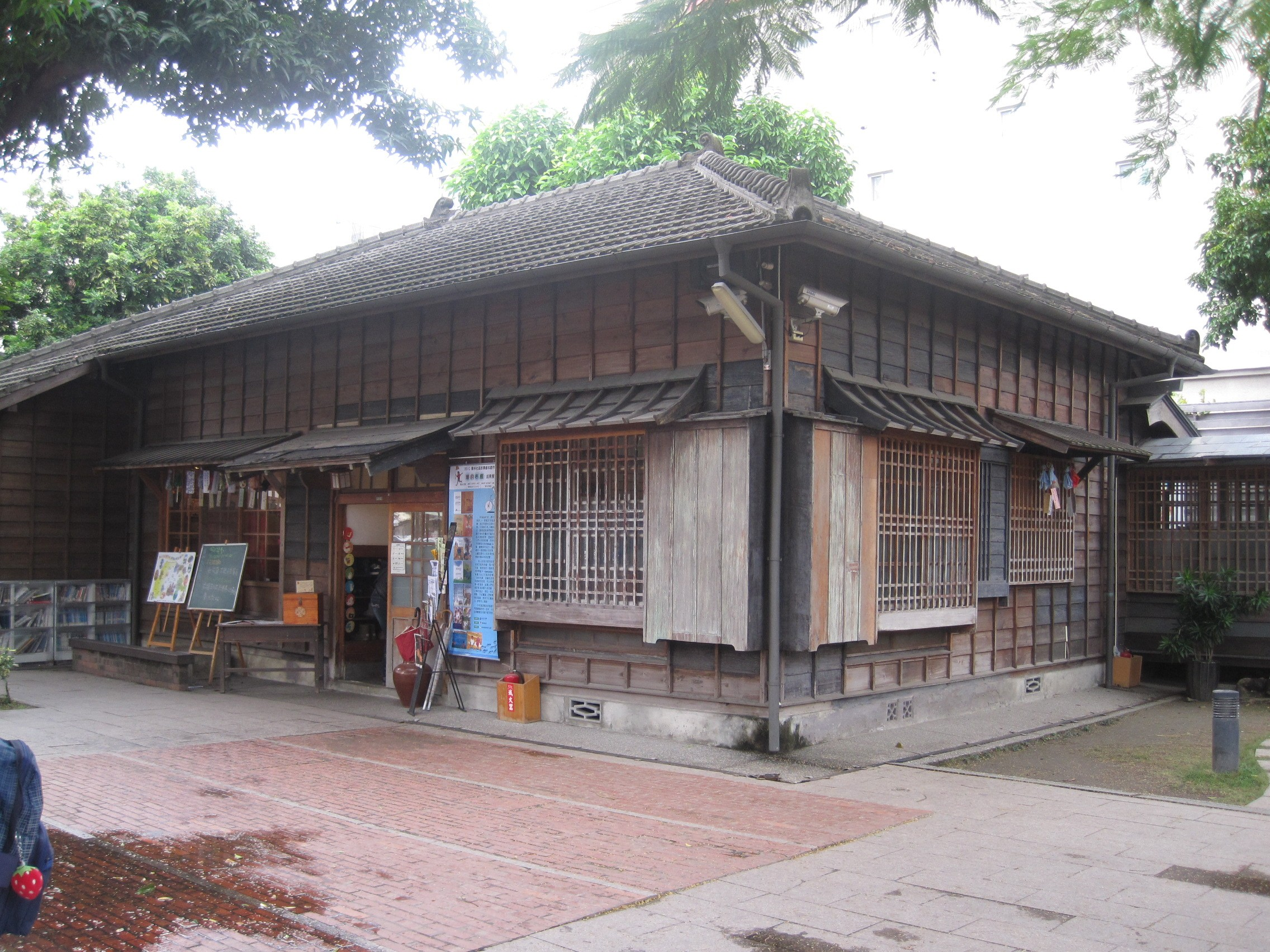
- Interactive map of the Yunlin Story House area

General information
- Location: Huwei, Yunlin, Taiwan
- Construction started: 1920
- Completed: 1923 (as Japanese Magistrate Residence of Huwei County); November 2006 (as Yunlin Story House)
- Opening: November 2006

Website
- Official website

The Yunlin Story House (also Yunlin Storyhouse, traditional Chinese: 雲林故事館; simplified Chinese: 云林故事馆; pinyin: Yúnlín Gùshì Guǎn) is a historic building in Huwei Township, Yunlin County, Taiwan.

== History ==
The museum building was originally constructed in 1920–1923 and opened for the residence of the Huwei County Magistrate of the Japanese government. After the handover of Taiwan back to China in 1945, the building was used for the residence of Huwei District Director.

In 2004, it underwent a restoration and completed in October 2006 as the Yunlin Story House. It was opened to the public a month later in November 2006.

== Exhibitions ==
The museum has the following exhibit areas:

- Living Space
- Service Space
- Passage Ways

== See also ==
- List of museums in Taiwan
