= Huwei, Yunlin =

Urban township in Yunlin, Taiwan

Coordinates: 23.719983°N 120.435364°E

Huwei Township 虎尾鎮 Kobi
- Urban township
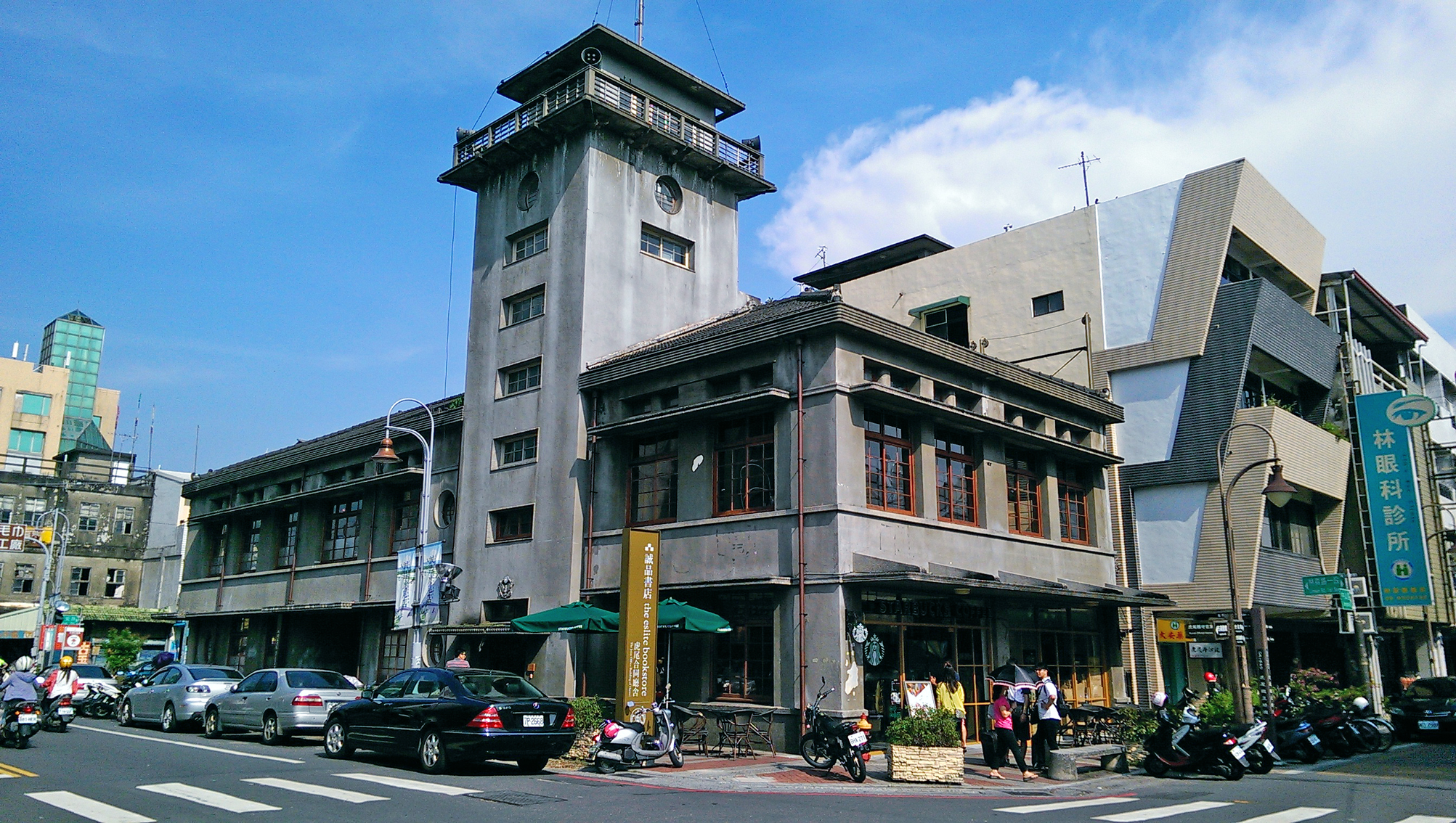
- Street view in Huwei

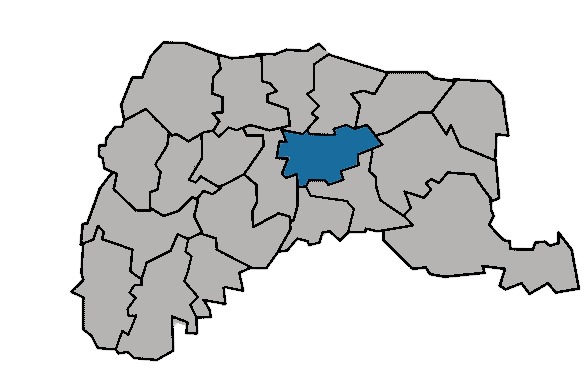
- Huwei Township in Yunlin County
- Location: Yunlin County, Taiwan

Area
  - Total: 69 km^{2} (27 sq mi)

Population (February 2023)
  - Total: 70,300
  - Density: 1,000/km^{2} (2,600/sq mi)

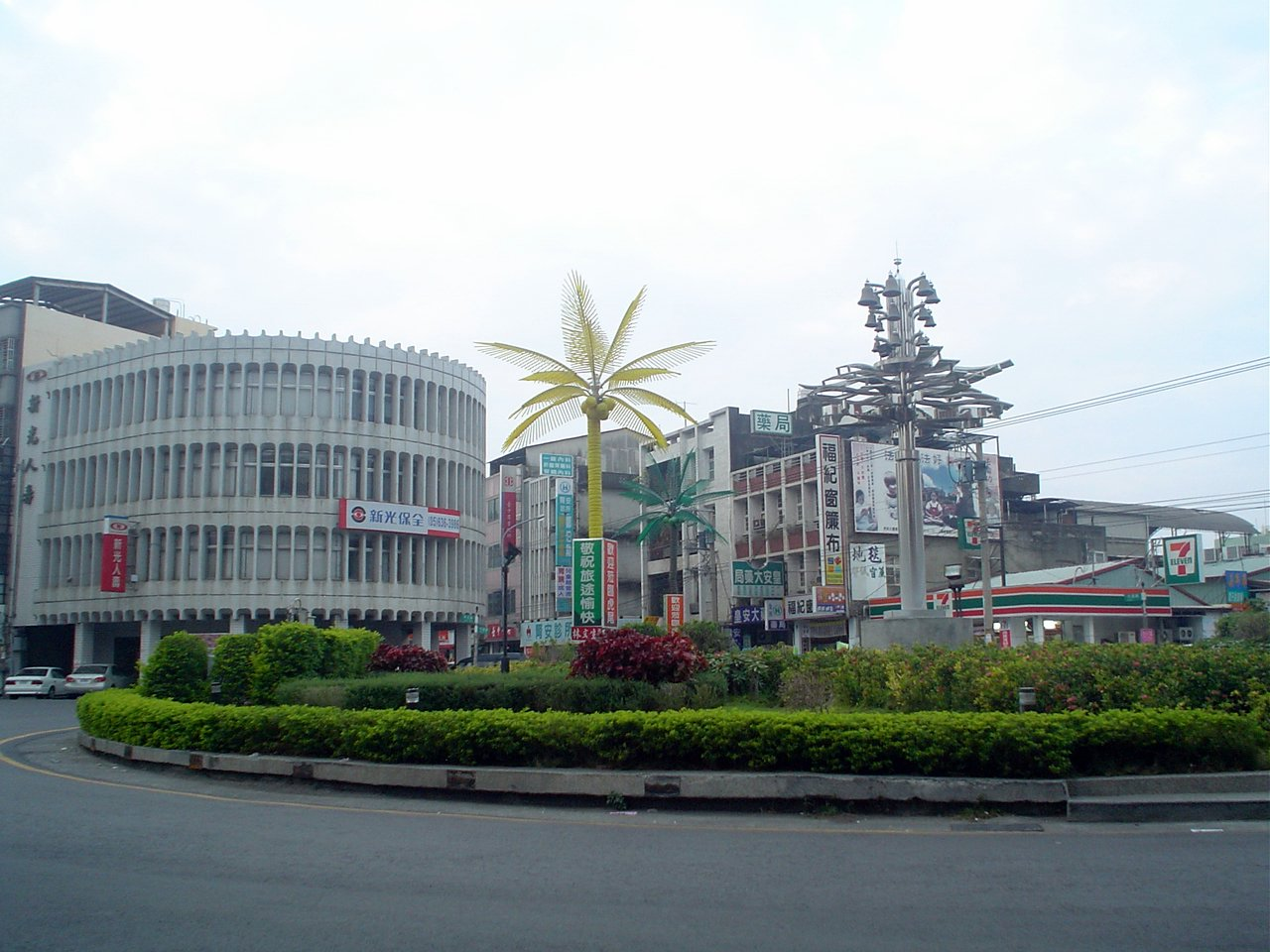
Downtown Huwei

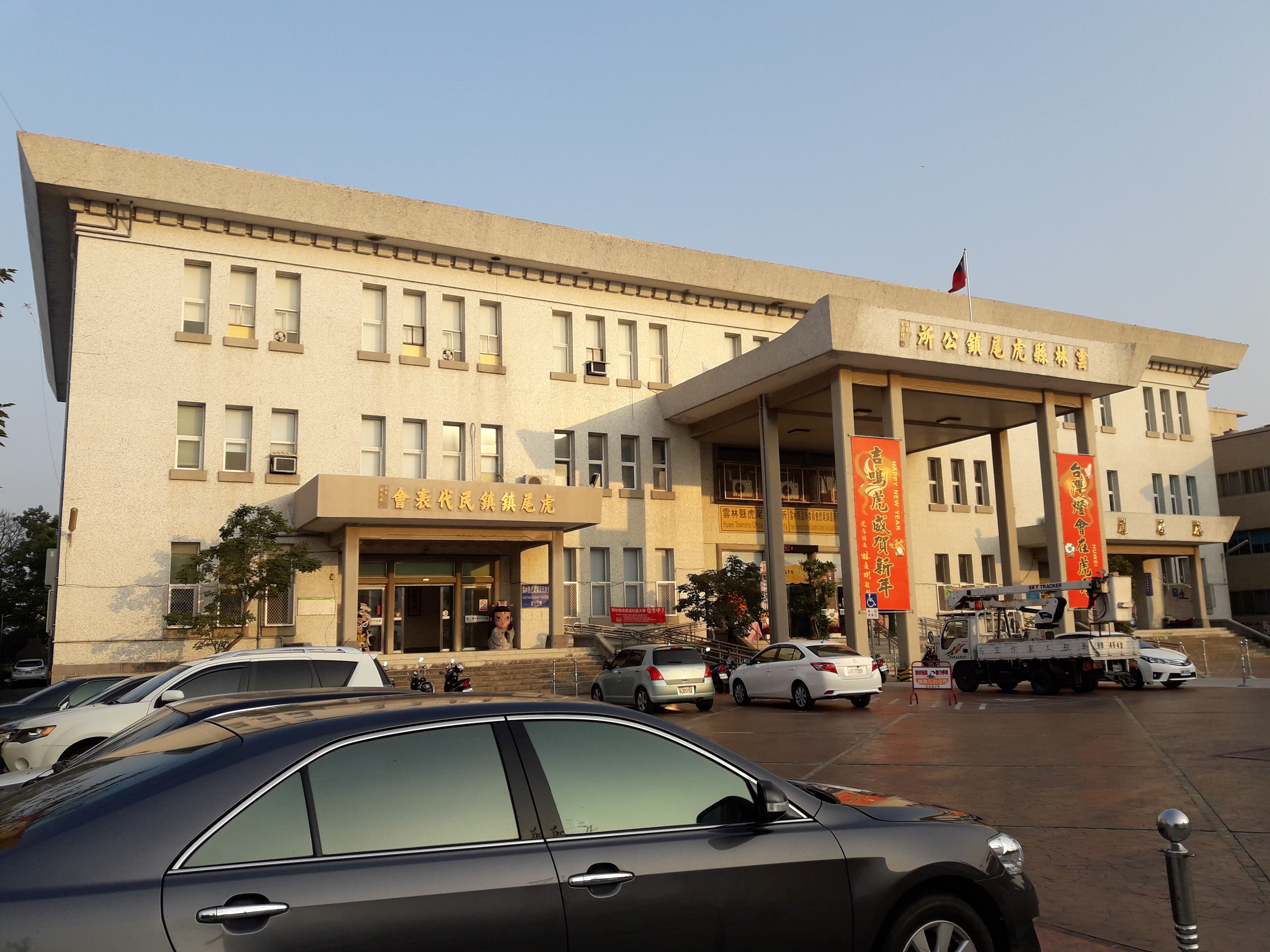
Huwei Township Office

Huwei Township (Chinese: 虎尾鎮; pinyin: Hǔwěi Zhèn; Pe̍h-ōe-jī: Hó͘-bóe-tìn or Hó͘-bé-tìn) is an urban township in Yunlin County, Taiwan. It has a population of about 70,300.

== Name ==
In the 17th century, during the Dutch era, Favorolang was one of the largest and most powerful aboriginal villages in Taiwan. The name has also been spelled Favorlang, Favorlangh, and Vovorollang. Its location was north of Tirosen (modern-day Chiayi), and the Favorlang river had been called by the Chinese How-boe-khe (Chinese: 吼尾溪) during the reign of the Qing Yongzheng Emperor (ca. 1722 – 1735). The Chinese name for the area (Chinese: 大崙腳庄) was later changed to Go-keng-chhu (Chinese: 五間厝庄; Pe̍h-ōe-jī: Gō͘ -keng-chhù-chng).

The name Favorlang is said to have derived from the ethnonym Babuza, a tribe of the Taiwanese Plains Aborigines.

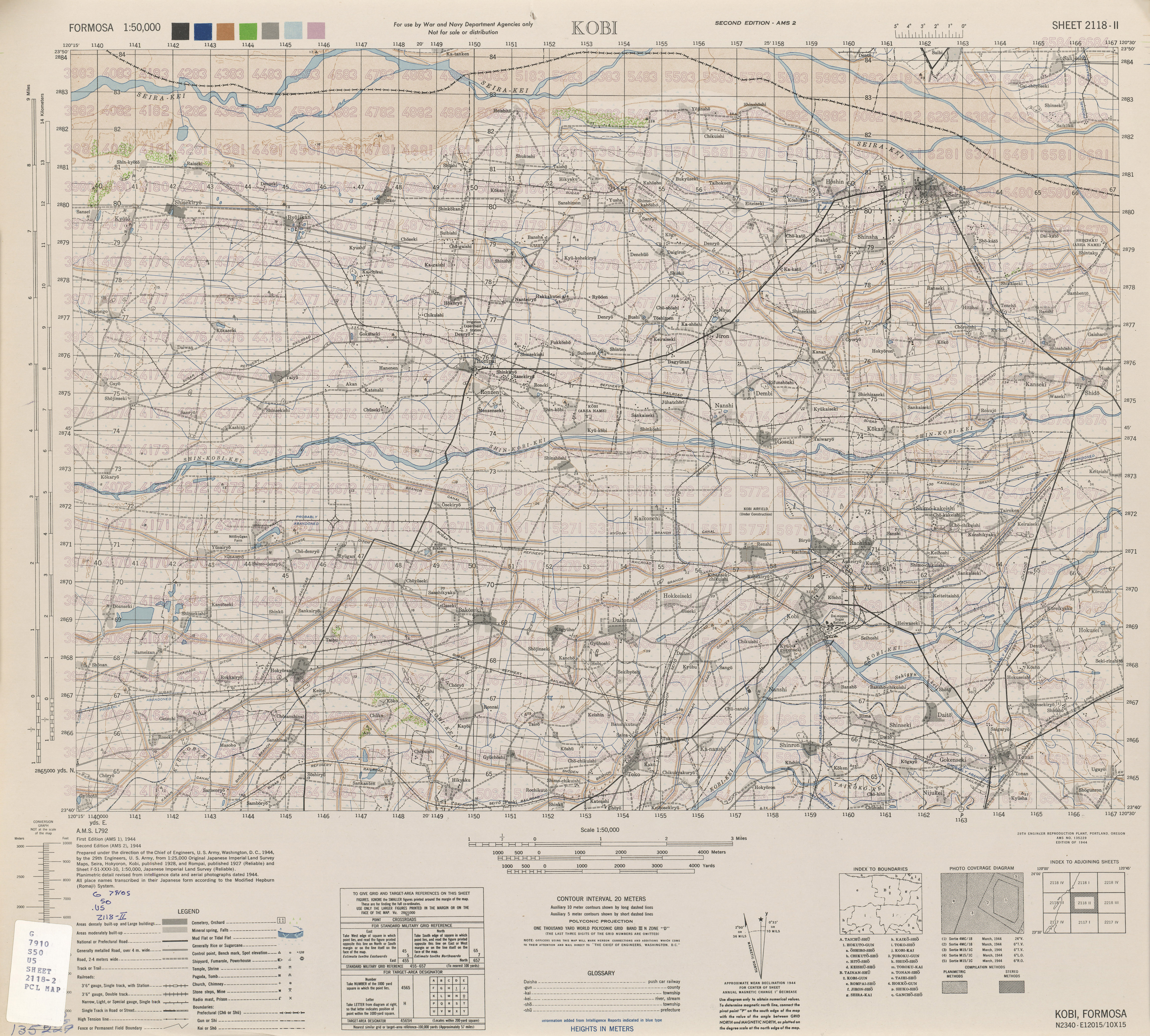
Map of Huwei (labeled as Kobi) and surrounding area (1944)

In 1920, during Taiwan's Japanese era, the town was administered as Kobi Town (Japanese: 虎尾庄), under Kobi District (虎尾郡), Tainan Prefecture. During this era, the town earned the nickname of "Sugar Capital" (糖都).

== Government ==
=== Administrative divisions ===
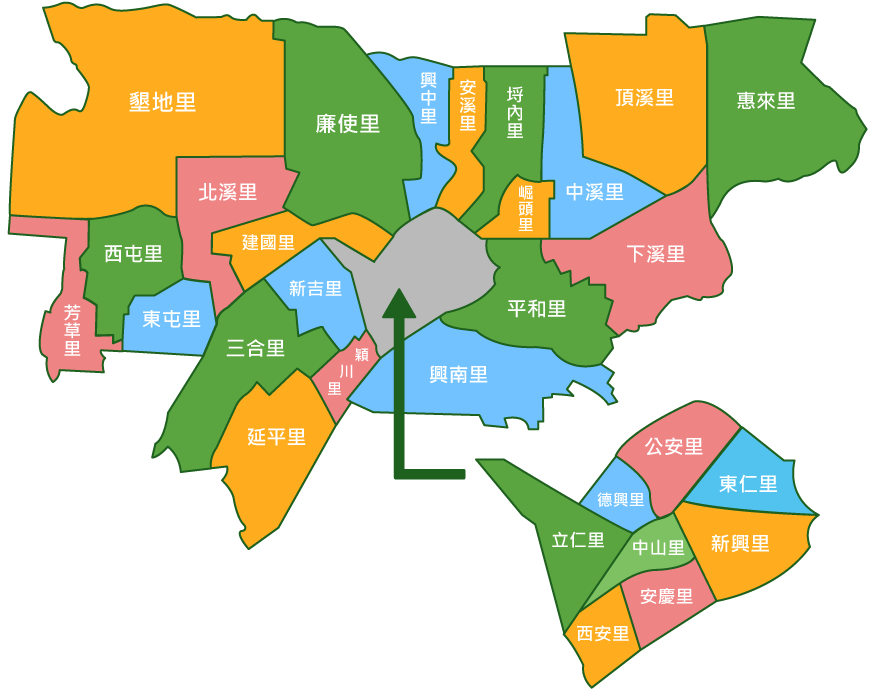
Villages in Huwei Township

There are 29 villages:

- Anqing
- Anxi
- Beixi
- Dexing
- Dingxi
- Dongren
- Dongtun
- Fangcao
- Gong'an
- Huilai
- Jianguo
- Juetou
- Kendi
- Lenei
- Lianshi
- Liren
- Pinghe
- Sanhe
- Xi'an
- Xiaxi
- Xingnan
- Xingzhong
- Xinji
- Xinxing
- Xitun
- Yanping
- Yingchuan
- Zhongshan
- Zhongxi

=== Local government ===
- Taiwan Yunlin District Court

== Economy ==
- Huwei Sugar Factory

== Education ==
- National Formosa University
- National Huwei Senior High School

== Tourist attractions ==
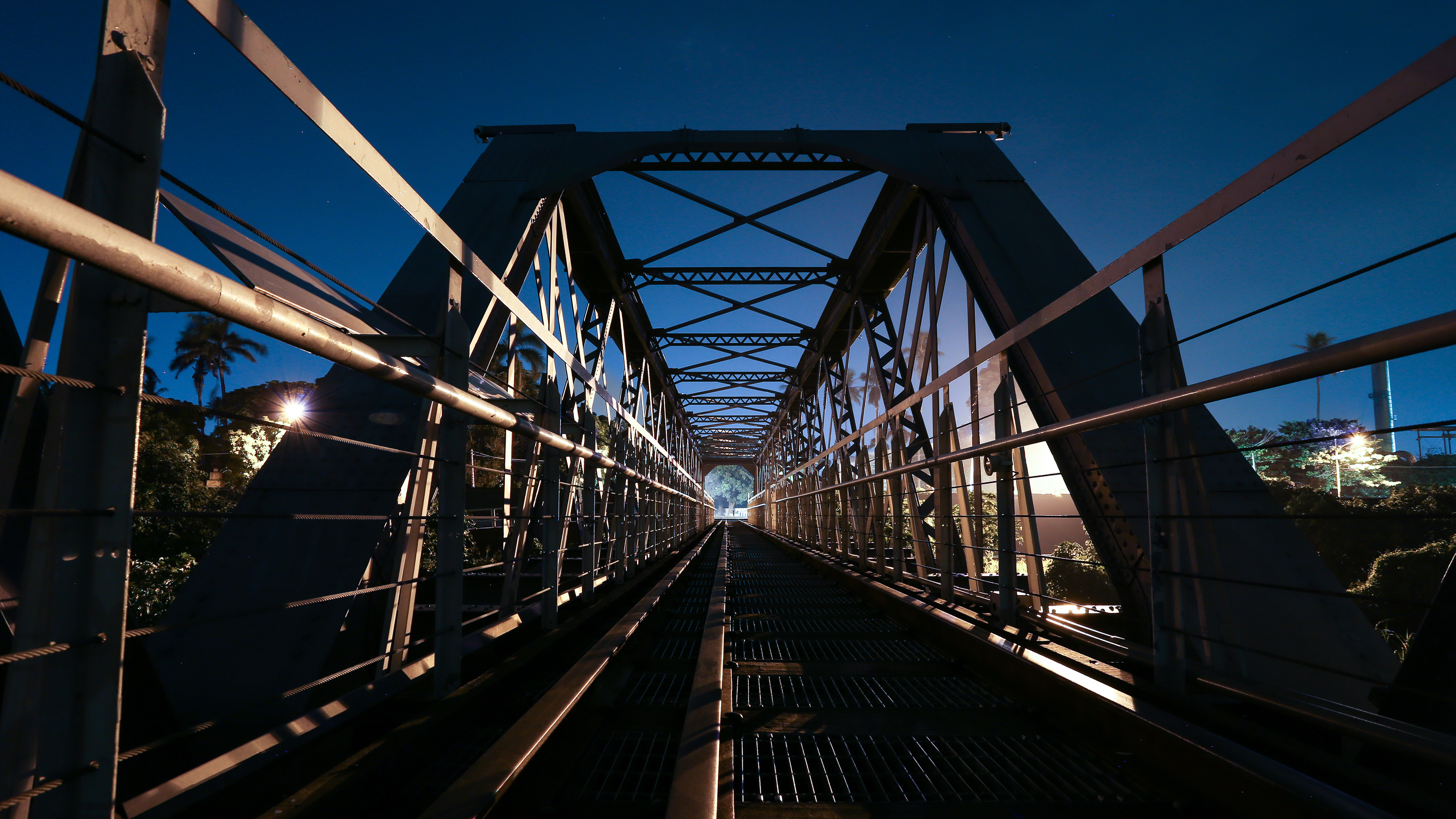
Huwei Sugar Factory Steel Bridge

- Huwei Sugar Factory Iron Bridge
- SL Towel Industrial Tourism and Explore Factory
- Tongxin Park
- Yunlin Hand Puppet Museum
- Yunlin Story House

== Transportation ==
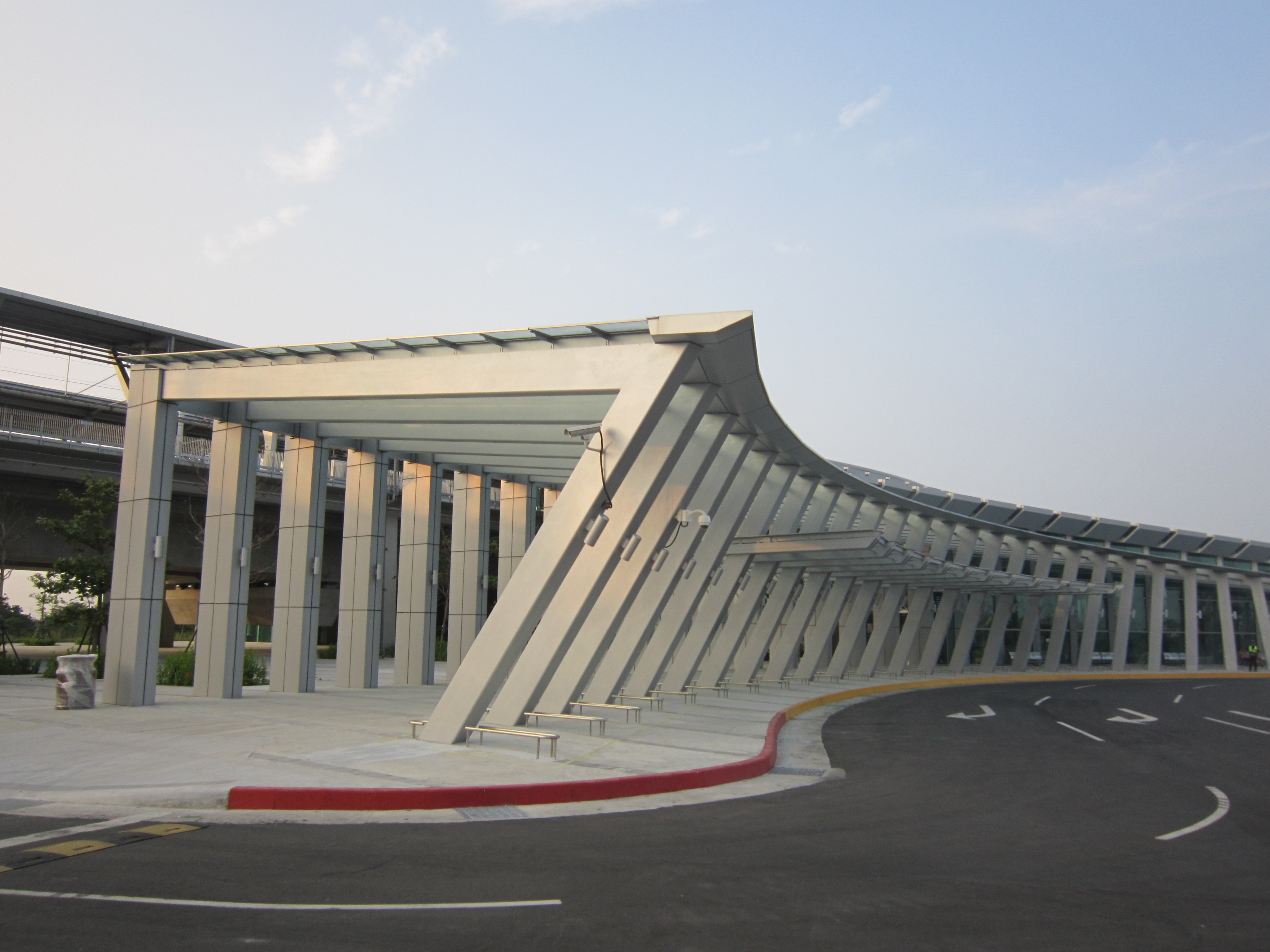
THSR Yunlin Station

The township houses the Taiwan High Speed Rail (THSR) Yunlin Station.

== Famous residents ==
- Gilbertus Happart

== Sister city relations ==
- Ōma, Aomori Prefecture, Japan

== Notable natives ==
- Chen Po-chih, Minister of the Council for Economic Planning and Development (2000–2002)
- Frankie Huang, actor and television host
