= List of 2026–27 TPBL season transactions =

This is a list of transactions that have taken place during the 2026 TPBL off-season and the 2026–27 TPBL season.

== Retirement ==
Date	Name	Team(s) played (years)	Age	Notes	Ref.
May 3	Austin Daye	New Taipei Kings (2024–2026)	37	TPBL champion (2025); Also played in the PLG, EASL and overseas.	
August 2	Chin Ming-Ching	Kaohsiung Aquas (2024–2026)	31	Also played in the SBL and the T1 League. Hired as strength and conditioning coach by the Kaohsiung Aquas.	
August 31	Lu Cheng-Ju	New Taipei Kings (2024–2026)	40	TPBL champion (2025); Also played in the SBL, PLG, EASL, and the BCL Asia. Hired as coach by the NTSU basketball team.	
September 16	Dar Tucker	Hsinchu Toplus Lioneers (2024–2025)	38	Also played in overseas.	
November 4	Liu Jen-Hao	New Taipei CTBC DEA (2024–2025)	30	Also played in the SBL, T1 League, and overseas.	

== Front office movements ==
=== Head coaching changes ===
Off-season

Departure date	Team	Outgoing head coach	Reason for departure	Hire date	Incoming head coach	Last coaching position	Ref.
June 9	Kaohsiung Aquas	Zhu Yong-Hong	Interim	June 9	Zico Coronel	Utsunomiya Brex head coach (2025–2026)	
July 1	Taipei Taishin Mars	Milan Stevanovic	Contract expired	September 24	Gianluca Tucci	Chinese Taipei men's national basketball team head coach (2024–2026)	
July 15	New Taipei CTBC DEA	Momir Ratković	Stepped down	July 15	Mathias Fischer	Kaohsiung Aquas head coach (2024–2025)	
July 22	New Taipei Kings	Hung Chih-Shan (interim)	Interim	July 22	Hung Chih-Shan	New Taipei Kings interim head coach (2025–2026)	

=== General manager changes ===
Off-season

Departure date	Team	Outgoing general manager	Reason for departure	Hire date	Incoming general manager	Last managerial position	Ref.
June 2	New Taipei CTBC DEA	Liu Chih-Wei	Assigned as full-time CTBC Sports Entertainment chief operating officer	June 2	Chen Hui	—N/a	

=== Team president changes ===
Off-season

Departure date	Team	Outgoing member	Reason for departure	Hire date	Incoming member	Last managerial position	Ref.
November 6	Hsinchu Toplus Lioneers	Chen Mei-Ling	Passed away	—N/a	—N/a	—N/a	

== Player movements ==
=== Trades ===
August
August 11	To Taipei Taishin Mars: 2027 Leopards' first-round pick; 2029 Leopards' first-round pick; Cash considerations	To Taoyuan Taiwan Beer Leopards: Kenneth Chien

=== Free agents ===
Player	Date signed	New team	Former team	Ref.
Tsai Cheng-Kang	June 18	Hsinchu Toplus Lioneers		
Tseng Po-Yu	June 24	Hsinchu Toplus Lioneers		
Lu Kuan-Hsuan	June 24	Hsinchu Toplus Lioneers		
Drew Pember	July 1	Hsinchu Toplus Lioneers		
Trey Thompkins	July 2	Formosa Dreamers		
Ben Bentil	July 2	Formosa Dreamers		
Aric Holman	July 2	Formosa Dreamers		
Brandon Gilbeck	July 2	Formosa Dreamers		
Ting Sheng-Ju	July 9	Taipei Taishin Mars		
Chen Kuan-Chuan	July 9	Taipei Taishin Mars		
Huang Tsung-Han	July 9	Taipei Taishin Mars		
Liu Yen-Ting	July 9	Taipei Taishin Mars		
Chen Li-Sheng	July 14	Hsinchu Toplus Lioneers	Taoyuan Pauian Pilots (P. League+)	
Craig Sword	July 15	New Taipei Kings	Rayos de Hermosillo (Mexico)	
Su Yi-Chin	July 17	Hsinchu Toplus Lioneers	Taipei Taishin Mars	
Chang Chao-Chen	July 20	Taoyuan Taiwan Beer Leopards	Taipei Taishin Mars	
Liu Cheng-Hsun	July 21	Hsinchu Toplus Lioneers		
Tanner Groves	July 26	New Taipei Kings	Saga Ballooners (Japan)	
Hunter Maldonado	July 27	Kaohsiung Aquas		
Kendall Lewis	July 28	New Taipei Kings	Argeș Pitești (Romania)	
Rosco Allen	July 28	Kaohsiung Aquas	Kawasaki Brave Thunders (Japan)	
Thomas Welsh	July 29	New Taipei Kings	Sun Rockers Shibuya (Japan)	
Grant Basile	July 29	Kaohsiung Aquas	Piratas de Quebradillas (Puerto Rico)	
Gabriel Galvanini	July 30	Kaohsiung Aquas	Peñarol (Uruguay)	
Hsiao Shun-Yi	July 31	New Taipei Kings	Hsinchu Toplus Lioneers	
Tang Wei-Chieh	August 2	Kaohsiung Aquas		
Wang Sheng-Lin	August 4	Taipei Taishin Mars	Caesar Keelung Black Kites (Super Basketball League, Undrafted in 2025)	
Cheick Diallo	August 5	Hsinchu Toplus Lioneers	Osos de Manatí (Puerto Rico)	
Jason Washburn	August 5	New Taipei Kings		
Malcolm Miller	August 5	Taoyuan Taiwan Beer Leopards		
Marvin Jones	August 5	New Taipei CTBC DEA	Meralco Bolts (Philippines)	
Lin Ting-Chien	August 6	Taipei Taishin Mars	Tianjin Pioneers (China)	
Chou Yi-Hsiang	August 7	New Taipei Kings	Caesar Keelung Black Kites (Super Basketball League)	
Brock Motum	August 10	Taoyuan Taiwan Beer Leopards	Toyama Grouses (Japan)	
Thomas Wimbush	August 10	Taoyuan Taiwan Beer Leopards	Shiga Lakes (Japan)	
Jade Tse	August 11	Hsinchu Toplus Lioneers		
Wu Yung-Cheng	August 12	Taipei Taishin Mars	Taipei Fubon Braves (P. League+)	
Sim Bhullar	August 12	Hsinchu Toplus Lioneers		
Vladimír Brodziansky	August 13	New Taipei CTBC DEA	Fujian Sturgeons (China)	
Stanton Kidd	August 18	Formosa Dreamers	Changsha Yongsheng (China)	
Tyrus McGee	August 18	Taipei Taishin Mars	Scaligera Basket Verona (Italy)	
Bogdan Bliznyuk	August 19	New Taipei CTBC DEA	Kaohsiung Aquas	
Clay Mounce	August 20	New Taipei CTBC DEA	Iwate Big Bulls (Japan)	
Chang Tsung-Hsien	August 20	Formosa Dreamers		
Marin Marić	August 20	Taipei Taishin Mars	Hsinchu Toplus Lioneers	
Shih Cheng-Ping	August 24	Formosa Dreamers		
Randall Walko	August 25	Formosa Dreamers		
Bryan Griffin	August 25	Taipei Taishin Mars	PGE Start Lublin (Poland)	
Justin Alston	August 26	Hsinchu Toplus Lioneers	Karşıyaka Basket (Turkey)	
Ma Chien-Hao	August 27	Formosa Dreamers		
Aleksandar Marelja	August 28	Taipei Taishin Mars	SPD Radnički (Serbia)	
Chuang Chao-Sheng	September 2	New Taipei Kings	Yankey Ark (P. League+)	
Lin Wei-Han	September 7	New Taipei CTBC DEA		
Hsieh Ya-Hsuan	September 7	New Taipei CTBC DEA		
Li Pei-Cheng	September 7	New Taipei CTBC DEA		
Li Ruei-Ci	September 7	New Taipei CTBC DEA		
Wang Lu-Hsiang	September 8	Hsinchu Toplus Lioneers	TSG GhostHawks (P. League+)	
Nemanja Nenadić	September 29	New Taipei CTBC DEA	Gaziantep Basketbol (Turkey)	
Humphery Gabriel	October 1	Taoyuan Taiwan Beer Leopards	Taiwan Beer (Super Basketball League)	
Sun Szu-Yao			Taipei Taishin Mars	
Rade Zagorac			Kaohsiung Aquas	
Wu Yen-Lun			Kaohsiung Aquas	
Jalen Harris			New Taipei Kings	
Lin Chin-Pang			New Taipei Kings	
Bogdan Bliznyuk			New Taipei CTBC DEA	
Chung Li-Hsiang			New Taipei Kings	
Ting Kuang-Hao			Taoyuan Taiwan Beer Leopards	

=== Going to other Taiwanese leagues ===
Player	Date signed	New team	New league	Former team	Ref.
Chang Keng-Yu	July 14	Taiwan Beer	Super Basketball League	Taipei Taishin Mars	
Tien Hao	July 14	Taiwan Beer	Super Basketball League	Hsinchu Toplus Lioneers (Waived on July 16)	
Su Pei-Kai	July 22	TSG GhostHawks	P. League+	New Taipei Kings	
Lee Chi-Wei	July 28	Taipei Fubon Braves	P. League+	Hsinchu Toplus Lioneers (Waived on June 30)	
Lasan Kromah	August 11	Taipei Fubon Braves	P. League+	Taoyuan Taiwan Beer Leopards	
Marko Todorović	August 19	Taipei Fubon Braves	P. League+	New Taipei CTBC DEA	
Lee Chia-Jui	August 26	Yankey Ark	P. League+	Hsinchu Toplus Lioneers	
Kao Kuo-Hao	September 3	TSG GhostHawks	P. League+	Hsinchu Toplus Lioneers	
Lu Chi-Erh	September 11	Taiwan Beer	Super Basketball League	Taoyuan Taiwan Beer Leopards	

=== Going overseas ===
Player	Date signed	New team	New country	Former team	Ref.
Chris McCullough	May 24	TNT Tropang 5G	Philippines	Taoyuan Taiwan Beer Leopards	
Cheick Diallo	May 28	Osos de Manatí	Puerto Rico	Taoyuan Taiwan Beer Leopards	
Nemanja Radović	July 1	Ehime Orange Vikings	Japan	New Taipei CTBC DEA	
Viktor Gaddefors	July 28	Twarde Pierniki Toruń	Poland	New Taipei CTBC DEA	
Edgaras Želionis	August 8	El Calor de Cancún	Mexico	Kaohsiung Aquas	
Darral Willis	August 10	Toyama Grouses	Japan	Taipei Taishin Mars	
Anžejs Pasečņiks	August 26	Petkim Spor	Turkey	Hsinchu Toplus Lioneers	
Wei Liang-Che	August 27	Shanxi Loongs	China	Kaohsiung Aquas	
Nick King	September 3	Nacional	Uruguay	New Taipei CTBC DEA	
Beau Beech	September 8	Zastal Zielona Góra	Poland	New Taipei CTBC DEA	
Efe Odigie	September 9	Henan Jiaozuo	China	Kaohsiung Aquas (Waived on March 10, 2026)	
Sani Sakakini (AI)	September 10	Kuwait	Kuwait	New Taipei Kings	
Reid Travis	September 25	Akita Northern Happinets	Japan	Kaohsiung Aquas (Waived on December 1, 2025)	
Makur Maker	October 1	Illawarra Hawks	Australia	Taipei Taishin Mars	
Michael Frazier	October 6	Beirut Club	Lebanon	Taipei Taishin Mars	
TJ Holyfield	October 8	Hapoel Holon	Israel	Hsinchu Toplus Lioneers	
Kristijan Krajina	October 11	KK Virtus Zagreb	Croatia	Kaohsiung Aquas	
Youssou Ndoye	October 30	Dar City	Tanzania	Taipei Taishin Mars	
Olufemi Olujobi	November 11	Goyang Sono Skygunners	South Korea	New Taipei Kings	

=== Waived ===
Player	Date waived	Former team	Ref.
Lee Chi-Wei	June 30	Hsinchu Toplus Lioneers	
Tien Hao	July 16	Hsinchu Toplus Lioneers	

(AI): Asian import players

== Draft ==
The 2026 TPBL draft was held on July 16, 2026, at Taipei 101 The One in Taipei City. 28 players participated in the draft, and eight players were chosen in two rounds.

Pick	Player	Date signed	Team	Ref.
1	Adam Hinton	July 17	Kaohsiung Aquas	
2	Wu Zhi-Kai	August 3	Taipei Taishin Mars	
3	Kuo Chia-An	—N/a	New Taipei CTBC DEA	
4	Fu Yu	July 31	Hsinchu Toplus Lioneers	
5	Pan Wei-Jie	August 14	New Taipei Kings	
6	Chen Ting-Lin	—N/a	Kaohsiung Aquas	
7	Ma Yo-Cheng	September 7	New Taipei CTBC DEA	
8	Benjamin Cheung	July 31	Hsinchu Toplus Lioneers	

== See also ==
- 2026–27 Formosa Dreamers season
- 2026–27 Hsinchu Toplus Lioneers season
- 2026–27 Kaohsiung Aquas season
- 2026–27 New Taipei CTBC DEA season
- 2026–27 New Taipei Kings season
- 2026–27 Taipei Taishin Mars season
- 2026–27 Taoyuan Taiwan Beer Leopards season
