= 2026–27 TPBL season =

3rd TPBL season

- League: Taiwan Professional Basketball League
- Sport: Basketball
- Duration: October 17, 2026 – May 16, 2027 (regular season)
- Games: 36 per team
- Teams: 7
- TV partner(s): VL Sports, MOMOTV, Sportcast

Draft
- Top draft pick: Adam Hinton
- Picked by: Kaohsiung Aquas

Regular season

Playoffs

Finals

Taiwan Professional Basketball League seasons
- ← 2025–26 2027–28 →

The 2026–27 TPBL season is the third season of the Taiwan Professional Basketball League (TPBL), with the Formosa Dreamers, Hsinchu Toplus Lioneers, Kaohsiung Aquas, New Taipei CTBC DEA, New Taipei Kings, Taipei Taishin Mars, and the Taoyuan Taiwan Beer Leopards participating in this competition. The regular season started on October 17, 2026 and is scheduled to end on May 16, 2027.

== Teams ==
Team	Chinese name	Location	Arena	Map
Formosa Dreamers	福爾摩沙夢想家	Taichung City	Taichung Intercontinental Basketball Stadium	2026–27 TPBL season is located in Taiwan
Hsinchu Toplus Lioneers	新竹御嵿攻城獅	Hsinchu County	Hsinchu County Stadium	2026–27 TPBL season is located in Taiwan
Kaohsiung Aquas	高雄全家海神	Kaohsiung City	Kaohsiung Arena	2026–27 TPBL season is located in Taiwan
New Taipei CTBC DEA	新北中信特攻	New Taipei City	Xinzhuang Gymnasium	2026–27 TPBL season is located in Taiwan
New Taipei Kings	新北國王	New Taipei City	Xinzhuang Gymnasium	2026–27 TPBL season is located in Taiwan
Taipei Taishin Mars	臺北台新戰神	Taipei City	Taipei Heping Basketball Gymnasium	2026–27 TPBL season is located in Taiwan
Taoyuan Taiwan Beer Leopards	桃園台啤永豐雲豹	Taoyuan City	Taoyuan Arena	2026–27 TPBL season is located in Taiwan

== Season format ==
- Each team plays against another six times, three at home and three on the road, respectively. Each team plays 36 matches total in the regular season.
- Play-in series: Best-of-three series. The series are contested by the teams that finished the regular season as the fourth seed and fifth seed. The fourth seed is awarded a one-win advantage. The winner can qualify to the semifinals series.
- Semifinals series: Best-of-five series. Matchup is decided by seeding in regular season. The first seed plays against the winner of play-in series, and the second seed plays against the third seed. The winners can qualify for the finals series.
- Finals series: Best-of-seven series. The series are contested by the winners of semifinals series.

== Import players restrictions ==
- Each team is able to register 3 to 4 import players.
- Each team is able to register 1 naturalised player as local player when naturalised player stayed in the same team for three years after finishing naturalisation.
- Each team is able to select 2 to 3 import players into active roster in each match.
- 8-Imports-In-4-Quarters Rule: each quarter can have 2 import players on the court.
- Player loan system is allowed between the teams in TPBL and different league.

== Import players ==
Team	Import players	Former players
Formosa Dreamers	(United States) Trey Thompkins (Ghana) Ben Bentil (United States) Aric Holman (United States) (Taiwan) Brandon Gilbeck (United States) Stanton Kidd	—N/a
Hsinchu Toplus Lioneers	(United States) Drew Pember (Mali) Cheick Diallo (Canada) Sim Bhullar (United States) Justin Alston	—N/a
Kaohsiung Aquas	(United States) Hunter Maldonado (Hungary) (United States) Rosco Allen (United States) (Italy) Grant Basile (Brazil) Gabriel Galvanini	—N/a
New Taipei CTBC DEA	(United States) Marvin Jones (Slovakia) Vladimír Brodziansky (United States) Clay Mounce (Serbia) Nemanja Nenadić	—N/a
New Taipei Kings	(United States) Craig Sword (United States) Tanner Groves (United States) Kendall Lewis (United States) Thomas Welsh (United States) (Bulgaria) Jason Washburn	—N/a
Taipei Taishin Mars	(United States) Tyrus McGee (Croatia) Marin Marić (United States) Bryan Griffin (Serbia) Aleksandar Marelja	—N/a
Taoyuan Taiwan Beer Leopards	(United States) Malcolm Miller (Australia) Brock Motum (United States) Thomas Wimbush (Nigeria) Humphery Gabriel	—N/a

== Transactions ==
=== Retirement ===
- On October 5, 2025, Austin Daye announced that he would retire at the end of the 2025–26 season.
- On May 3, 2026, New Taipei Kings held the retirement ceremony for Austin Daye.
- On August 2, 2026, Chin Ming-Ching was named as the strength and conditioning coach of the Kaohsiung Aquas, ending his playing career.
- On August 31, 2026, Lu Cheng-Ju announced his retirement from professional basketball.
- On September 16, 2026, Dar Tucker announced his retirement from professional basketball.
- On November 4, 2026, Liu Jen-Hao announced his retirement from professional basketball.

=== Draft ===
The 2026 TPBL draft was held on July 16, 2026, at Taipei 101 The One in Taipei City.

=== Coaching changes ===
Coaching changes
Team	2025–26 season	2026–27 season
Off-season
Kaohsiung Aquas	Zhu Yong-Hong (interim)	Zico Coronel
Taipei Taishin Mars	Milan Stevanovic (interim)	Gianluca Tucci
New Taipei CTBC DEA	Momir Ratković	Mathias Fischer
New Taipei Kings	Hung Chih-Shan (interim)	Hung Chih-Shan

==== Off-season ====
- On June 9, 2026, the Kaohsiung Aquas hired Zico Coronel as their new head coach.
- On July 1, 2026, the Taipei Taishin Mars announced that Milan Stevanovic left the team after contract expired.
- On July 15, 2026, the New Taipei CTBC DEA announced that Momir Ratković stepped down as the head coach. And the New Taipei CTBC DEA hired Mathias Fischer as their new head coach.
- On July 22, 2026, the New Taipei Kings interim head coach, Hung Chih-Shan was promoted to the new head coach.
- On September 24, 2026, the Taipei Taishin Mars hired Gianluca Tucci as their new head coach.

== Preseason ==
The Taiwan Professional Basketball League held the preseason games at the Taipei Heping Basketball Gymnasium on October 9 to 11, 2026.

=== Game log ===
October 9, 2026 Preseason #01	Kaohsiung Aquas	133–136(OT)	New Taipei CTBC DEA	Taipei City
14:30 (UTC+8)	Scoring by quarter: 38–35, 37–36, 26–20, 17–27, Overtime: 15–18
	Pts: Allen 35; Rebs: Allen 15; Asts: Maldonado, Yu Huan-Ya 6	boxscore	Pts: Hsieh Ya-Hsuan 27; Rebs: Brodziansky 19; Asts: Wei Chia-Hao, Bachir 6	Arena: Taipei Heping Basketball Gymnasium; Referees: Chen Chao-Hung, Lai Chien-Hao, Wu Fang-Shan

October 9, 2026 Preseason #02	Taipei Taishin Mars	122–114	Formosa Dreamers	Taipei City
17:00 (UTC+8)	Scoring by quarter: 30–35, 31–27, 33–26, 28–26
	Pts: McGee 29; Rebs: Marić 13; Asts: Lin Ting-Chien, McGee 6	boxscore	Pts: Kidd 22; Rebs: Holman 13; Asts: Holman 6	Arena: Taipei Heping Basketball Gymnasium; Referees: Lin Yuan-Dian, Hou Chun-Jen, Tsai Tsung-Ting

October 10, 2026 Preseason #03	Taoyuan Taiwan Beer Leopards	93–107	New Taipei Kings	Taipei City
12:00 (UTC+8)	Scoring by quarter: 26–22, 25–32, 20–26, 22–27
	Pts: Motum 30; Rebs: Motum 9 Asts: Gao Jin-Wei 9	boxscore	Pts: Sword 20; Rebs: Sword, Lewis 9 Asts: three players 3	Arena: Taipei Heping Basketball Gymnasium; Referees: Chuang Chih-Chun, Hsieh Shang-Chien, Yang Shih-Hsien

October 10, 2026 Preseason #04	Hsinchu Toplus Lioneers	110–134	Kaohsiung Aquas	Taipei City
14:30 (UTC+8)	Scoring by quarter: 31–37, 34–40, 22–17, 23–40
	Pts: Liu Cheng-Hsun, Diallo 21; Rebs: Alston 12; Asts: Lu Kuan-Hsuan 3	boxscore	Pts: Allen 29; Rebs: Allen 11; Asts: Allen, Maldonado 7	Arena: Taipei Heping Basketball Gymnasium; Referees: Sung Ming-Lu, Yu Fu-Jung, Lin Tsung-Yun

October 10, 2026 Preseason #05	Formosa Dreamers	97–92	New Taipei CTBC DEA	Taipei City
17:00 (UTC+8)	Scoring by quarter: 25–31, 23–10, 22–23, 27–28
	Pts: Lin Chun-Chi 23; Rebs: Holman 9 Asts: Chiang Yu-An 4	boxscore	Pts: Mounce 28; Rebs: Brodziansky 11; Asts: Wei Chia-Hao 9	Arena: Taipei Heping Basketball Gymnasium; Referees: Huang Chen-Feng, Chen Chien-Lin, Ou Yang Yu-Hsien

October 11, 2026 Preseason #06	Taipei Taishin Mars	110–94	Taoyuan Taiwan Beer Leopards	Taipei City
12:00 (UTC+8)	Scoring by quarter: 28–23, 34–23, 17–24, 31–24
	Pts: Lin Ting-Chien, Marić 18; Rebs: Marić 15; Asts: Ting Sheng-Ju 6	boxscore	Pts: Wimbush 23; Rebs: Wimbush, Motum 9 Asts: Motum 7	Arena: Taipei Heping Basketball Gymnasium; Referees: Lin Chien-Hung, Lo Kuo-Hsien, Chen Ching-Hsiang

October 11, 2026 Preseason #07	New Taipei Kings	100–97	Hsinchu Toplus Lioneers	Taipei City
14:30 (UTC+8)	Scoring by quarter: 13–26, 26–22, 33–21, 28–28
	Pts: Washburn 25; Rebs: Washburn 13; Asts: J. Lin 7	boxscore	Pts: Liu Cheng-Hsun, Diallo 19; Rebs: Pember, Diallo 8 Asts: Tseng Po-Yu 5	Arena: Taipei Heping Basketball Gymnasium; Referees: Chen Hung-Ming, Peng Shih-Hsuan, Hsu Wei-Kai

== Regular season ==
The regular season started on October 17, 2026 and is scheduled to end on May 16, 2027. On October 17, the 2026–27 season opening game, matched by the New Taipei Kings and the Formosa Dreamers, was played at Taichung Intercontinental Basketball Stadium.

=== League table ===
Pos	Team	Pld	W	L	PCT	GB	Qualification
1	Kaohsiung Aquas	6	4	2	.667	—	Advance to semifinals
2	New Taipei Kings	5	3	2	.600	0.5	Advance to semifinals
3	New Taipei CTBC DEA	5	3	2	.600	0.5	Advance to semifinals
4	Taipei Taishin Mars	4	2	2	.500	1	Advance to play-in
5	Taoyuan Taiwan Beer Leopards	4	2	2	.500	1	Advance to play-in
6	Hsinchu Toplus Lioneers	3	1	2	.333	1.5	
7	Formosa Dreamers	5	1	4	.200	2.5	

Source: TPBL

=== Results ===
Home \ Away	MARS	DEA	KINGS	LEOPARDS	LIONEERS	DREAMERS	AQUAS
Taipei Taishin Mars	—	Dec 27	Dec 26	102–91	Dec 30	103–90	Jan 17
Taipei Taishin Mars	—	Mar 6	Jan 16	Apr 14	Jan 23	Jan 24	Feb 27
Taipei Taishin Mars	—	Apr 11	Feb 28	May 8	Mar 7	Apr 10	May 9
New Taipei CTBC DEA	94–87	—	81–89	Dec 12	Jan 3	Jan 2	104–106
New Taipei CTBC DEA	TBD	—	Mar 20	Feb 27	Apr 3	Feb 28	Dec 13
New Taipei CTBC DEA	Apr 4	—	May 15	Mar 21	May 16	Mar 26	Apr 9
New Taipei Kings	Dec 2	Dec 4	—	81–89	93–95	Jan 30	Dec 19
New Taipei Kings	Feb 20	Jan 31	—	Feb 21	Dec 20	Mar 6	Mar 7
New Taipei Kings	Apr 28	May 1	—	Mar 14	Mar 13	May 2	May 7
Taoyuan Taiwan Beer Leopards	Dec 20	Dec 25	93–110	—	100–95*	Dec 19	Jan 24
Taoyuan Taiwan Beer Leopards	Jan 31	Jan 23	Dec 23	—	Jan 30	Feb 13	Apr 3
Taoyuan Taiwan Beer Leopards	Mar 27	Mar 28	Feb 14	—	May 2	Apr 4	May 1
Hsinchu Toplus Lioneers	Dec 5	Dec 6	Jan 6	Jan 10	—	Feb 21	129–132**
Hsinchu Toplus Lioneers	Mar 21	Feb 20	Apr 11	Apr 10	—	Mar 17	Jan 9
Hsinchu Toplus Lioneers	Apr 24	Apr 25	May 9	May 5	—	May 8	Mar 20
Formosa Dreamers	Dec 13	98–115	106–113*	Nov 27	Nov 25	—	115–114
Formosa Dreamers	Jan 10	Jan 9	Dec 12	Jan 17	Jan 16	—	90–107
Formosa Dreamers	May 15	Mar 13	Apr 17	May 16	Apr 18	—	Mar 14
Kaohsiung Aquas	132–121	100–128	Jan 2	Dec 5	Dec 26	Dec 6	—
Kaohsiung Aquas	Jan 3	Feb 13	Mar 28	Feb 17	Feb 14	Dec 27	—
Kaohsiung Aquas	Apr 18	Apr 17	Apr 24	Apr 25	Mar 27	Feb 19	—

Source: TPBL
Legend: Blue = home team win; Red = away team win.

=== Postponed games due to Typhoon ===
- One Hsinchu Toplus Lioneers home game (against the Formosa Dreamers on October 24, 2026) was postponed to March 17, 2027, due to the Typhoon Champi.
- One New Taipei CTBC DEA home game (against the Taipei Taishin Mars on October 24) was postponed due to the Typhoon Champi.

== Playoffs ==
- Play-in series: The fourth and fifth seeds play the best-of-three play-in series. The fourth seed will be awarded a one-win advantage. The winner can qualify the semifinals series.
- Semifinals series: The winner of play-in series and the top three seeds play the best-of-five semifinals series. The winners can qualify the finals series.
- Finals series: The winners of the semifinals series play the best-of-seven finals series.

== Statistics ==
=== Individual statistic leaders ===
Category	Player	Team	Statistic
Points per game			
Rebounds per game			
Assists per game			
Steals per game			
Blocks per game			
Turnovers per game			
Fouls per game			
Minutes per game			
FG%			
3P%			
FT%			

=== Individual game highs ===
Category	Player	Team	Statistic
Points	Rosco Allen	Kaohsiung Aquas	42
Rebounds	Rosco Allen	Kaohsiung Aquas	22
Assists	Rosco Allen	Kaohsiung Aquas	11
Assists	Wei Chia-Hao	New Taipei CTBC DEA	11
Steals	Lin Ting-Chien	Taipei Taishin Mars	5
Steals	Yu Huan-Ya	Kaohsiung Aquas	5
Blocks	Drew Pember	Hsinchu Toplus Lioneers	5
Turnovers	Tyrus McGee	Taipei Taishin Mars	9
Three pointers	Gao Jin-Wei	Taoyuan Taiwan Beer Leopards	6
Three pointers	Grant Basile	Kaohsiung Aquas	6
Three pointers	Lin Yan-Ting	New Taipei Kings	6

=== Team statistic leaders ===
Category	Team	Statistic
Points per game		
Rebounds per game		
Assists per game		
Steals per game		
Blocks per game		
Turnovers per game		
Fouls per game		
FG%		
3P%		
FT%		

== Awards ==
=== Yearly awards ===
2026–27 TPBL awards
Award		Recipient	Team	Ref.
Most Valuable Player				
Most Valuable Import				
Defensive Player of the Year				
Rookie of the Year				
Sixth Man of the Year				
Most Improved Player				
Most Popular Player of the Year				
Comeback Player of the Year				
Social Justice Award				
Coach of the Year				
General Manager of the Year				
Home-Court of the Year				
Cheerleading Team of the Year				
Most Popular Cheerleader of the Year				
Most Popular Mascot of the Year				
Plays of the Year	Clutch Play of the Year			
Plays of the Year	Dunk of the Year			
Plays of the Year	Assist of the Year			
Plays of the Year	Block of the Year			

- All-TPBL First Team:
  - ()
  - ()
  - ()
  - ()
  - ()
- All-TPBL Second Team:
  - ()
  - ()
  - ()
  - ()
  - ()

- All-Defensive First Team:
  - ()
  - ()
  - ()
  - ()
  - ()
- All-Defensive Second Team:
  - ()
  - ()
  - ()
  - ()
  - ()

=== Statistical awards ===
2026–27 TPBL statistical awards
Award	Recipient	Team	Statistic	Ref.
Points Leader				
Rebounds Leader				
Assists Leader				
Steals Leader				
Blocks Leader				
Three-Point Leader				

=== Finals awards ===
2027 TPBL Finals awards
Award	Recipient	Team	Ref.
Champion			
Finals MVP			

=== Player of the Week ===
Week	Local player		Import player		Ref.
Week	Recipient	Team	Recipient	Team	Ref.
1	Lin Chun-Chi	Formosa Dreamers	Brandon Gilbeck	Formosa Dreamers	
2	Joseph Lin	New Taipei Kings	Rosco Allen	Kaohsiung Aquas	
3	Mohammad Al Bachir Gadiaga	New Taipei CTBC DEA	Drew Pember	Hsinchu Toplus Lioneers	
4	Lin Ting-Chien	Taipei Taishin Mars	Marin Marić	Taipei Taishin Mars	
5	Joseph Lin	New Taipei Kings	Craig Sword	New Taipei Kings	

=== Player of the Month ===
Month	Local player		Import player		Ref.
Month	Recipient	Team	Recipient	Team	Ref.
2026
October & November					
December					
2027
January & February					
March					
April & May					

== Media ==
- The games will be broadcast on television via VL Sports, MOMOTV, Sportcast, and online via YouTube, VL Sports APP, DAZN and AXN Asia.

== Notable occurrences ==
- On July 1, 2026, the TPBL announced that Yang He-Ping resigned from deputy secretary for career decision.
- On October 7, 2026, the TPBL announced a sponsorship with the Shopee.
- On October 7, 2026, the player loan system was allowed between the teams in TPBL and different league.
- On October 25, 2026, Rosco Allen of the Kaohsiung Aquas became the first player to record 40-20 (with 42 points and 22 rebounds) in TPBL history.
- On November 15, 2026, Ting Sheng-Ju of the Taipei Taishin Mars recorded 400 assists in TPBL career.

== See also ==
- 2026–27 Formosa Dreamers season
- 2026–27 Hsinchu Toplus Lioneers season
- 2026–27 Kaohsiung Aquas season
- 2026–27 New Taipei CTBC DEA season
- 2026–27 New Taipei Kings season
- 2026–27 Taipei Taishin Mars season
- 2026–27 Taoyuan Taiwan Beer Leopards season
