= TPBL Cheerleading =

The Taiwan Professional Basketball League (TPBL) is a professional basketball league in Taiwan. All teams have a squad of dancers for cheerleading.

== Current squads ==
Name	Team	Seasons	Ref.
Aqua Mermaids	Kaohsiung Aquas	2024–present	
Formosa Sexy	Formosa Dreamers	2024–present	
Leopard Girls	Taoyuan Taiwan Beer Leopards	2024–present	
Muse Girls	Hsinchu Toplus Lioneers	2024–present	
Passion Sisters	New Taipei CTBC DEA	2024–present	
Queens	New Taipei Kings	2024–present	
Taishin Wonders	Taipei Taishin Mars	2024–present	

== Cheerleading Team of the Year ==
Since 2025, the league set the Cheerleading Team of the Year.

Year	Squad	Team	Ref.
2025	Passion Sisters	New Taipei CTBC DEA	
2026	Passion Sisters	New Taipei CTBC DEA	

== Most Popular Cheerleader of the Year ==
Since 2025, the league set the Most Popular Cheerleader of the Year.

Year	Cheerleader	Squad	Ref.
2025	Aviva	Taishin Wonders	
2026	Yua Mikami	Formosa Sexy	
