= List of TPBL arenas =

The following list includes all current and former arenas used by current teams playing in the Taiwan Professional Basketball League (TPBL). Other information included in this list are arena locations, seating capacities, years opened, and in use.

== Current arenas ==
Image	Arena	Location	Team(s)	Capacity	Opened	Season of first TPBL game	Ref(s)
	Hsinchu County Stadium	Hsinchu County	Hsinchu Toplus Lioneers	8,000	2005	2024–2025	
	Kaohsiung Arena	Kaohsiung City	Kaohsiung Aquas	15,000	2008	2024–2025	
	Taichung Intercontinental Basketball Stadium	Taichung City	Formosa Dreamers	3,000	2016	2024–2025	
	Taipei Heping Basketball Gymnasium	Taipei City	Taipei Taishin Mars	7,000	2017	2024–2025	
	Taoyuan Arena	Taoyuan City	Taoyuan Taiwan Beer Leopards	8,700	1993	2024–2025	
	Xinzhuang Gymnasium	New Taipei City	New Taipei CTBC DEA; New Taipei Kings	6,800	2002	2024–2025	

== Former arena ==
Team	Arena	Years used	Capacity	Opened	Location	Ref.
New Taipei CTBC DEA	Taipei Heping Basketball Gymnasium	2026 (play-in)	7,000	2017	Taipei City	
New Taipei Kings	Taipei Heping Basketball Gymnasium	2026 (semifinals)	7,000	2017	Taipei City	
Taipei Taishin Mars	Hsinchu County Stadium	2025 (play-in)	8,000	2005	Hsinchu County	
Taoyuan Taiwan Beer Leopards	Taoyuan City Zhongli Civil Sports Center	2026 (9 games)	2,000	2018	Taoyuan City	

== Preseason arenas ==
Arena	Years used	Capacity	Opened	Location	Ref.
Hsinchu County Stadium	2024	8,000	2005	Hsinchu County	
Pingtung County Stadium	2025	6,000	1995	Pingtung County	
Taichung Intercontinental Basketball Stadium	2024	3,000	2016	Taichung City	
Taipei Heping Basketball Gymnasium	2026	7,000	2017	Taipei City	

== Home-Court of the Year ==
Since 2025, the league set the Home-Court of the Year.

Year	Home court	Team	Ref.
2025	Hsinchu County Stadium	Hsinchu Toplus Lioneers	
2026	Hsinchu County Stadium	Hsinchu Toplus Lioneers	

== See also ==
- Taiwan Professional Basketball League
- List of basketball arenas
- List of stadiums in Taiwan
