= Thomas Robinson (basketball) =

American-Lebanese basketball player (born 1991)

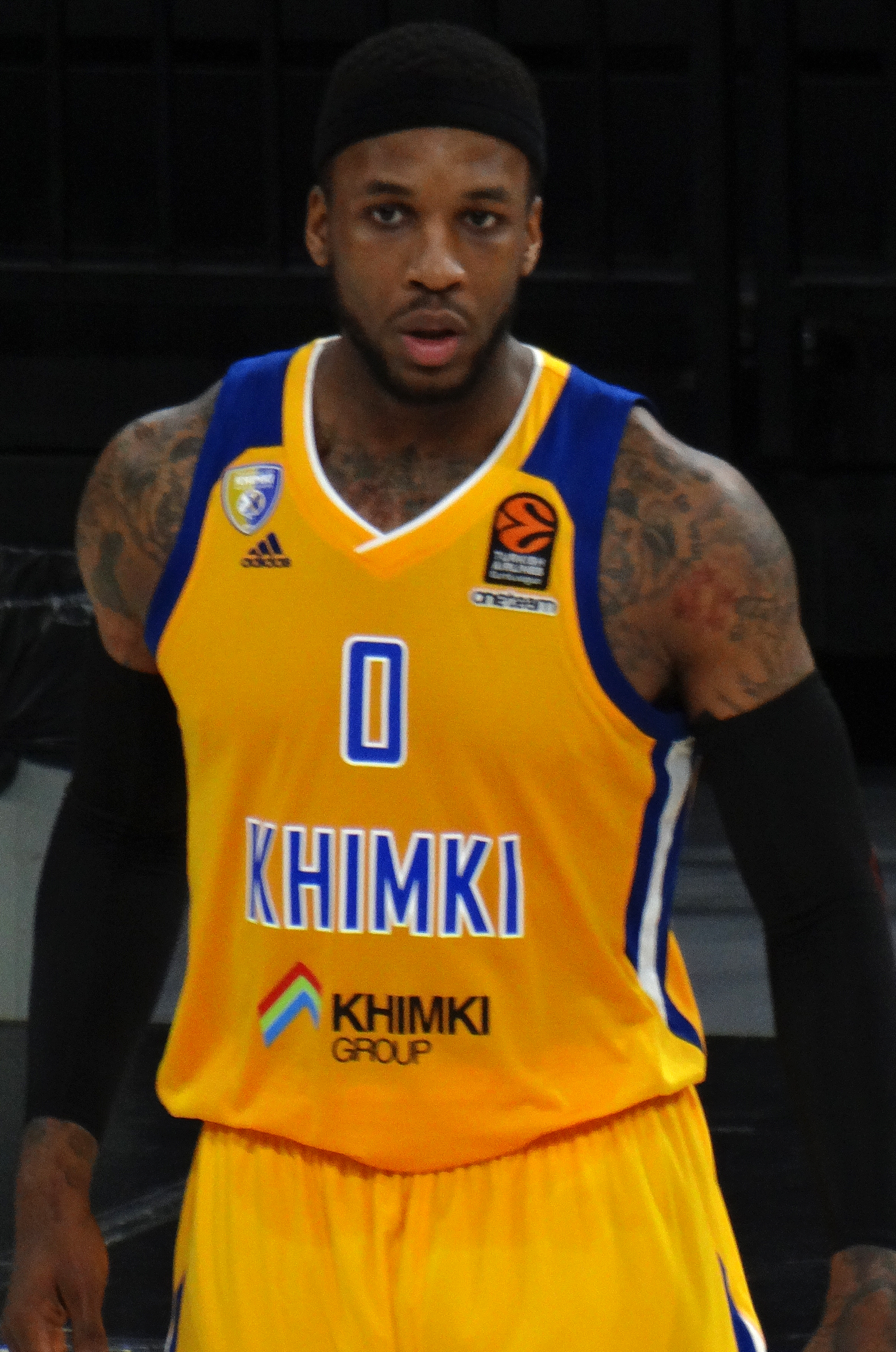
- Robinson with Khimki in 2018

No. 36 – Leones de Ponce
- Position: Center / power forward
- League: BSN

Personal information
- Born: March 17, 1991 (age 35) Washington, D.C., U.S.
- Listed height: 6 ft 10 in (2.08 m)
- Listed weight: 240 lb (109 kg)

Career information
- High school: Brewster Academy (Wolfeboro, New Hampshire)
- College: Kansas (2009–2012)
- NBA draft: 2012: 1st round, 5th overall pick
- Drafted by: Sacramento Kings
- Playing career: 2012–present

Career history
- 2012–2013: Sacramento Kings
- 2013: Houston Rockets
- 2013–2015: Portland Trail Blazers
- 2015: Philadelphia 76ers
- 2015–2016: Brooklyn Nets
- 2016–2017: Los Angeles Lakers
- 2017–2018: Khimki
- 2018–2019: Beikong Fly Dragons
- 2019: Maine Red Claws
- 2019–2020: Sichuan Blue Whales
- 2020: Khimki
- 2020–2021: Bahçeşehir Koleji
- 2021: Cangrejeros de Santurce
- 2021–2022: Seoul Samsung Thunders
- 2022: Piratas de Quebradillas
- 2022–2023: Real Estelí
- 2023: Grises de Humacao
- 2023: Capitanes de Arecibo
- 2023: Cariduros de Fajardo
- 2023: Leones de Ponce
- 2023: NLEX Road Warriors
- 2024: Pelita Jaya
- 2024: Gigantes de Carolina
- 2024: Astros de Jalisco
- 2024–2025: Taipei Taishin Mars
- 2025: Paisas Basketball
- 2025: Cangrejeros de Santurce
- 2026: Piratas de Quebradillas
- 2026: Indios de Mayagüez
- 2026–present: Leones de Ponce

Career highlights
- BSN rebounding leader (2026); Consensus first-team All-American (2012); Big 12 Player of the Year (2012); First-team All-Big 12 (2012); Fourth-team Parade All-American (2009); No. 0 retired by Kansas Jayhawks
- Stats at NBA.com
- Stats at Basketball Reference

Thomas Earl Robinson (born March 17, 1991) is an American-born naturalised Lebanese professional basketball player for the Leones de Ponce of the Baloncesto Superior Nacional (BSN). A consensus All-American at the University of Kansas, Robinson was drafted fifth overall in the 2012 NBA draft by the Sacramento Kings.

== High school career ==
Robinson grew up in Washington, DC, and attended Eastern High School, and Riverdale Baptist before moving on to the Brewster Academy in Wolfeboro, New Hampshire. Robinson averaged 16 points, 13 rebounds and 5 blocks per game his senior year.

Robinson was ranked as the No. 24 recruit by Scout.com, No. 31 by Rivals.com and No. 40 by ESPN.com as a high school senior.

College recruiting
Name	Hometown	School	Height	Weight	Commit date
Thomas Robinson; PF	Washington, DC	Brewster Academy	6 ft 8 in (2.03 m)	222 lb (101 kg)	Oct 10, 2008
Thomas Robinson; PF	Recruit ratings: Scout: Rivals: (93)				

== College career ==
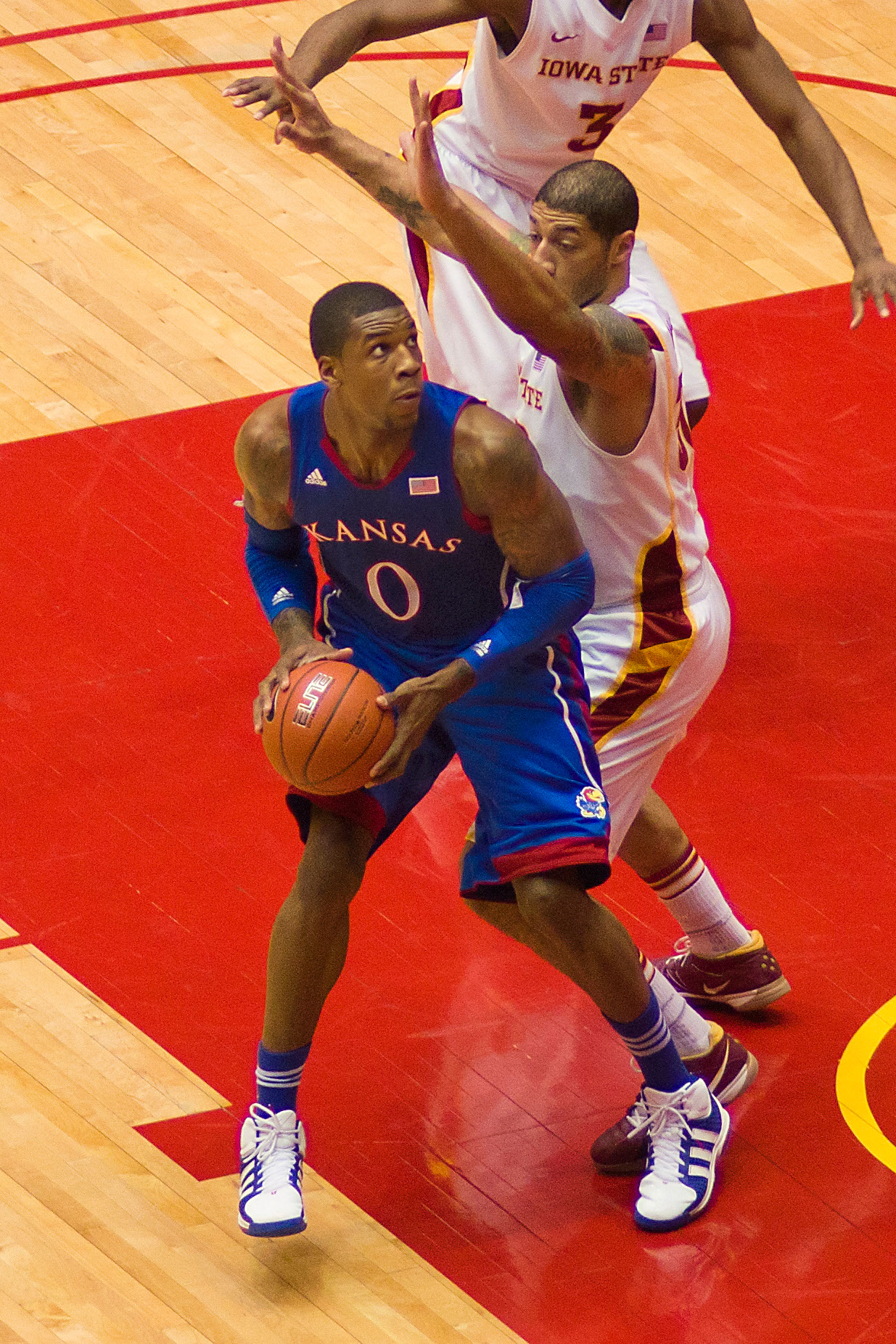
Robinson at Kansas.

Robinson began his junior year and the 2011–2012 men's college basketball season as one of 50 candidates for the preseason John R. Wooden Award. Along with senior teammate Tyshawn Taylor, Robinson was expected to become one of the leaders for the Kansas team.

On December 31, 2011, in a game against the University of North Dakota, Robinson scored 30 points and grabbed 21 rebounds. He was the first Kansas player to record a 30/20 performance since Wayne Hightower scored 36 points and grabbed 21 rebounds in a 1961 game against the University of Missouri. At the end of the Big 12 conference regular season, Robinson was second in the nation with 22 double doubles behind O.D. Anosike of Siena College. At that point, Robinson averaged 18 points and 11.9 rebounds.

Prior to their game on January 22, 2011, against Texas, Kansas players, coaches and fans held a moment of silence in honor of Robinson, who had lost his grandmother, grandfather, and mother all within three weeks of one another. After the game, Kansas coach Bill Self said "For him to even be out there on the court was remarkable."

On March 4, 2012, Robinson was named the 2012 Big 12 Player of the Year. All-Big 12 awards are selected by the league's head coaches. On March 5, 2012, he was named the Associated Press Big 12 Player of the Year.

On April 9, 2012, Robinson decided to forgo his senior season and declared for the 2012 NBA draft.

=== College statistics ===
Year	Team	GP	GS	MPG	FG%	3P%	FT%	RPG	APG	SPG	BPG	PPG
2009–10	Kansas	33	1	7.2	.485	.000	.395	2.7	.3	.2	.5	2.5
2010–11	Kansas	33	2	14.6	.601	.000	.510	6.4	.6	.4	.7	7.6
2011–12	Kansas	39	39	31.8	.505	.500	.682	11.9	1.8	1.1	.9	17.7
Career		105	42	18.7	.525	.500	.606	7.3	1.0	.6	.7	9.8

=== College awards and honors ===
- Consensus first-team All-American (2012)
- NCAA Final Four All-Tournament Team (2012)
- Big 12 Conference Player of the Year (2012)
- First team All-Big 12 (2012)
- ESPN.com National Player of the Year (2012)
- John R. Wooden Award Finalist (2012)
- Naismith College Player of the Year Finalist (2012)

== Professional career ==
=== Sacramento Kings (2012–2013) ===
On June 28, 2012, Robinson was drafted fifth overall in the 2012 NBA draft by the Sacramento Kings. On November 7, 2012, in the fourth quarter of a game against the Detroit Pistons, Robinson hit Jonas Jerebko in the throat with an elbow, and was ejected from the game. The following day, he was suspended for two games.

=== Houston Rockets (2013) ===
On February 21, 2013, Robinson was traded, along with Francisco García and Tyler Honeycutt, to the Houston Rockets in exchange for Patrick Patterson, Toney Douglas, Cole Aldrich and cash considerations. Robinson was given up on by the Kings due to the emergence of DeMarcus Cousins as well as the Kings' struggles to find playing time for Robinson.

=== Portland Trail Blazers (2013–2015) ===
On July 10, 2013, Robinson was traded to the Portland Trail Blazers in exchange for the rights to Kostas Papanikolaou and Marko Todorović, as well as two future second-round picks. On February 23, 2014, Robinson recorded 14 points and a career-high 18 rebounds in a 108–97 win over the Minnesota Timberwolves. In 2013–14, he averaged 4.8 points and 4.4 rebounds in 70 games.

The 2014–15 season saw Robinson consigned to the bench, buried on the depth chart by the team's off-season addition of former All-Star big man Chris Kaman. Robinson's first real opportunity of the season came with the injury of starting center Robin Lopez, who fractured his right hand on December 15 in a win over the San Antonio Spurs. Robinson made his first NBA start in the team's next game, a December 17 home contest against the Milwaukee Bucks, racking up 15 points and 16 rebounds to help the Trail Blazers win 104–97. He became the third Blazers player to put up at least 15 points and 15 rebounds in his first start; the other two being Bill Walton and Maurice Lucas. In subsequent games, Robinson was paired with Kaman off the bench, playing solid reserve minutes as power forward behind LaMarcus Aldridge.

=== Philadelphia 76ers (2015) ===
On February 19, 2015, Robinson was traded, along with Will Barton, Víctor Claver and a lottery-protected 2016 first-round pick, to the Denver Nuggets in exchange for Arron Afflalo and Alonzo Gee. Three days later, he was waived by the Nuggets before playing in a game for them.

On February 24, 2015, Robinson was claimed off waivers by the Philadelphia 76ers. The next day, he made his debut for the 76ers, recording seven points and six rebounds in a 104–88 loss to the Milwaukee Bucks.

=== Brooklyn Nets (2015–2016) ===
On July 9, 2015, Robinson signed with the Brooklyn Nets. He made his debut for the Nets in the team's season opener against the Chicago Bulls on October 28, recording four points and five rebounds off the bench in a 115–100 loss. On March 5, 2016, he had a season-best game with 18 points and 17 rebounds in 40 minutes as a starter in a 132–118 loss to the Minnesota Timberwolves. On March 29, he made just his second start of the season and again scored 18 points, this time in a loss to Orlando Magic. On April 3, he recorded his fourth straight double-double with 11 points and 15 rebounds in a 106–87 loss to the New Orleans Pelicans.

=== Los Angeles Lakers (2016–2017) ===
On September 21, 2016, Robinson signed with the Los Angeles Lakers. On March 21, 2017, Robinson scored a season-high 16 points in a 133–109 loss to the Los Angeles Clippers. He tied that mark on April 1, 2017, recording 16 points and nine rebounds in another loss to the Clippers. A day later, Robinson recorded his first double-double of the season with 12 points and 10 rebounds in a 108–103 win over the Memphis Grizzlies.

=== Khimki (2017–2018) ===
On September 23, 2017, Robinson signed with Russian club Khimki for the 2017–18 season.

On August 30, 2018, Robinson signed with the Atlanta Hawks. On October 13, 2018, Robinson was waived by the Hawks.

=== Beikong Fly Dragons (2018–2019) ===
On December 3, 2018, Robinson signed with Chinese club Beikong Fly Dragons.

=== Maine Red Claws (2019) ===
On March 17, 2019, the Maine Red Claws of the NBA G League announced via Twitter that they had acquired Robinson off waivers.

=== Khimki (2020) ===
On February 6, 2020, Robinson returned to his former Russian club Khimki of the VTB United League and the EuroLeague, signing a one-month contract with an option to renew for the rest of the season. He averaged 4.2 points and 3.2 rebounds per game in four EuroLeague games. Robinson parted ways with the team on August 4.

=== Bahçeşehir Koleji (2020–2021) ===
On November 25, 2020, Robinson signed with Bahçeşehir Koleji of the Turkish Basketball Super League (BSL).

=== Cangrejeros de Santurce (2021) ===
On May 28, 2021, Cangrejeros de Santurce announced that they had added Robinson to their roster.

=== Seoul Samsung Thunders (2021–2022) ===
On November 28, 2021, Robinson signed with Seoul Samsung Thunders of the Korean Basketball League.

=== Piratas de Quebradillas (2022) ===
On February 16, 2022, Robinson returned to Puerto Rico, this time signing with Piratas de Quebradillas.

In August 2022, he signed with the San Miguel Beermen of the Philippine Basketball Association (PBA) as the team's import for the 2022–23 PBA Commissioner's Cup. However, he was replaced prior to playing a game with the team due to injury.

=== NLEX Road Warriors (2023) ===
In September 2023, he signed with the NLEX Road Warriors of the Philippine Basketball Association (PBA) as the team's import for the 2023–24 PBA Commissioner's Cup. On November 22, 2023, during NLEX's 112–104 win over NorthPort Batang Pier, Robinson was involved in several collisions and had heated exchanges with NorthPort players and staff. In the tunnel after the game, Robinson and NorthPort team manager Pido Jarencio cursed each other, and the latter threatened "I'll shoot you later!". The PBA imposed a ₱20,000 (US$361) fine on Jarencio for the incident. However, Robinson was released by NLEX for taking an unplanned vacation and missing team practices. He had played four games for them.

=== Pelita Jaya (2024) ===
On December 11, 2023, Robinson signs with the Pelita Jaya of the Indonesian Basketball League (IBL) as the team's 2024 season import player. On May 24, 2024, Pelita Jaya parted ways with Robinson.

=== Taipei Taishin Mars (2024–2025) ===
On November 30, 2024, Robinson signed with the Taipei Taishin Mars of the Taiwan Professional Basketball League (TPBL). On January 21, 2025, Taipei Taishin Mars terminated the contract with Robinson.

=== Paisas Basketball (2025) ===
In March 2025, Robinson joined Paisas Basketball of the Basketball Champions League Americas. He appeared in two games for the team.

=== Cangrejeros de Santurce (2025–present) ===
On March 22, 2025, Robinson signed with the Cangrejeros de Santurce of the Baloncesto Superior Nacional (BSN) in Puerto Rico, for the 2025 BSN season.

== Career statistics ==
Legend
GP	Games played	GS	Games started	MPG	Minutes per game
FG%	Field-goal percentage	3P%	3-point field-goal percentage	FT%	Free-throw percentage
RPG	Rebounds per game	APG	Assists per game	SPG	Steals per game
BPG	Blocks per game	PPG	Points per game	PIR	Performance index rating
**Bold**	Career high

=== NBA ===
==== Regular season ====
Year	Team	GP	GS	MPG	FG%	3P%	FT%	RPG	APG	SPG	BPG	PPG
2012–13	Sacramento	51	0	15.9	.424	.000	.577	4.7	.7	.5	.4	4.8
2012–13	Houston	19	0	13.0	.449	.000	.421	4.1	.5	**.8**	.3	4.5
2013–14	Portland	70	0	12.5	.481	.000	.564	4.4	.5	.3	.3	4.8
2014–15	Portland	32	4	12.2	.516	.000	.438	4.2	.3	.5	.3	3.6
2014–15	Philadelphia	22	0	**18.5**	.467	.000	**.603**	**7.7**	**1.1**	.7	**.7**	**8.8**
2015–16	Brooklyn	**71**	**7**	12.9	.447	.000	.431	5.1	.6	.5	.5	4.3
2016–17	L.A. Lakers	48	1	11.7	**.536**	.000	.470	4.6	.6	.5	.2	5.0
Career		313	12	13.4	.470	.000	.505	4.8	.6	.5	.4	4.9

==== Playoffs ====
Year	Team	GP	GS	MPG	FG%	3P%	FT%	RPG	APG	SPG	BPG	PPG
2014	Portland	11	0	11.1	.419	.000	.857	2.6	.5	.5	.5	2.9
Career		11	0	11.1	.419	.000	.857	2.6	.5	.5	.5	2.9

=== NBA G League ===
Year	Team	GP	GS	MPG	FG%	3P%	FT%	RPG	APG	SPG	BPG	PPG
2018–19	Maine	4	0	26.5	.585	.250	.684	13.5	1.5	1.3	1.0	19.0
Career		4	0	26.5	.585	.250	.684	13.5	1.5	1.3	1.0	19.0

=== EuroLeague ===
Year	Team	GP	GS	MPG	FG%	3P%	FT%	RPG	APG	SPG	BPG	PPG	PIR
2017–18	Khimki	20	1	15.6	.486	.000	.417	5.8	.4	.7	.6	8.2	9.1
Career		20	1	15.6	.486	.000	.417	5.8	.4	.7	.6	8.2	9.1

== National team career ==
After receiving a Lebanese passport in December 2021, Robinson joined the Lebanon national basketball team. However, he has not played a game since.

== Personal life ==
Thomas lost his grandmother, grandfather, and mother within three weeks while in college. He has a younger sister named Jayla Paris who was born in 2003 and an older brother named Jamal Robinson.

After the deaths of Robinson's mother and grandparents, Angel Morris, the mother of NBA twins Marcus and Markieff Morris, took care of both Thomas and his younger sister.

Robinson is the co-founder of the Family Over Everything Foundation (F.O.E) alongside the Morris twins and their mother.

In December 2021, Robinson received a Lebanese passport.
