= Marko Todorović (basketball) =

Montenegrin basketball player (born 1992)

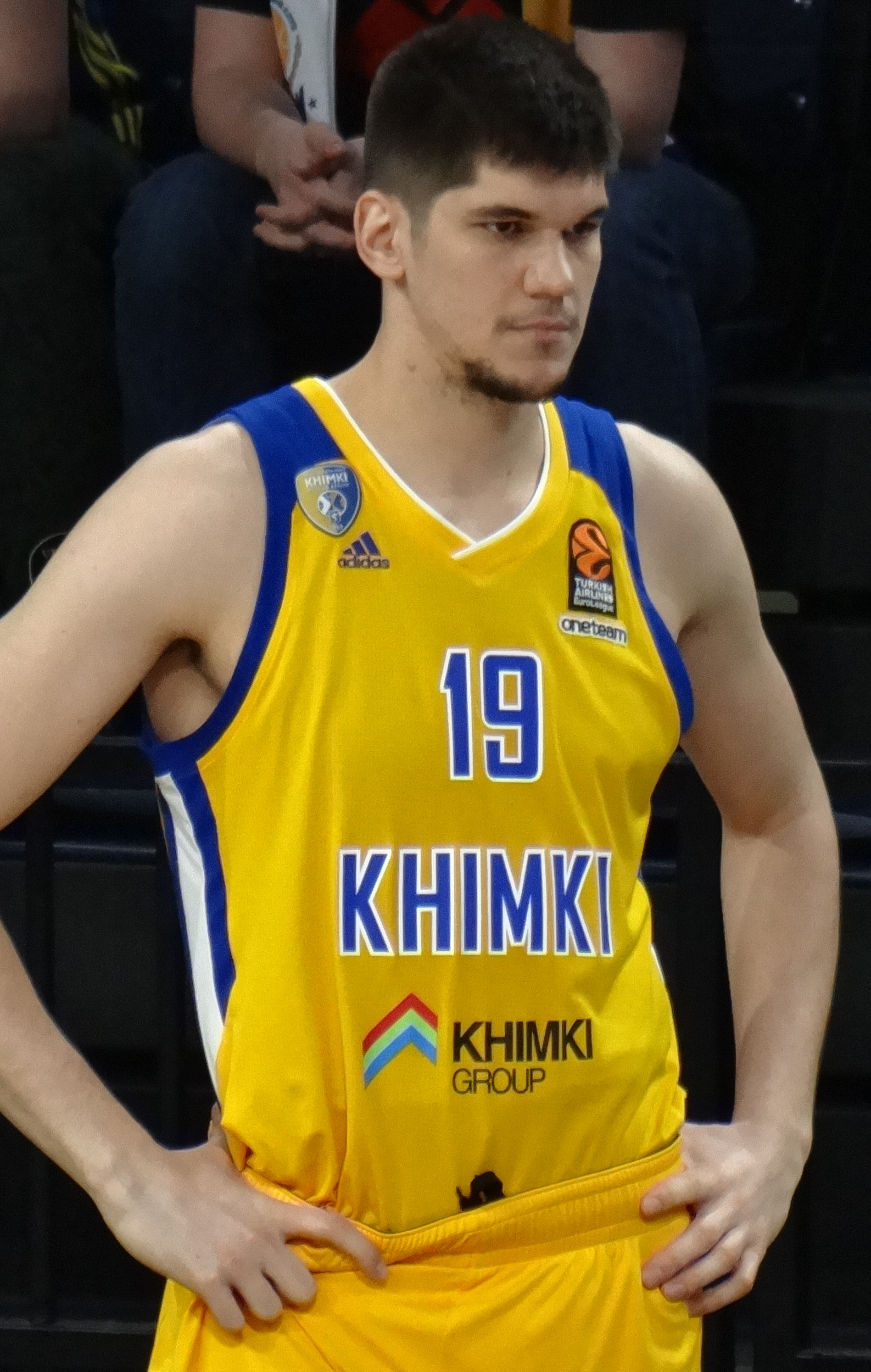
- Todorović with Khimki, 2019

No. 18 – Taipei Fubon Braves
- Position: Power forward / center
- League: P. League+ East Asia Super League

Personal information
- Born: April 19, 1992 (age 34) Podgorica, SR Montenegro, SFR Yugoslavia
- Listed height: 6 ft 10 in (2.08 m)
- Listed weight: 250 lb (113 kg)

Career information
- NBA draft: 2013: 2nd round, 45th overall pick
- Drafted by: Portland Trail Blazers
- Playing career: 2010–present

Career history
- 2010–2012: FIATC Joventut
- 2010–2012: →Prat Juventud Badalona
- 2012–2015: FC Barcelona
- 2014–2015: →Bilbao Basket
- 2015–2018: Khimki
- 2016: →Dominion Bilbao Basket
- 2018–2019: Divina Seguros Joventut
- 2019–2021: Tianjin Ronggang
- 2021: Coosur Real Betis
- 2021–2022: Beijing Royal Fighters
- 2022–2023: Ningbo Rockets
- 2023: Shaanxi Wolves
- 2023–2025: UCAM Murcia
- 2025–2026: New Taipei CTBC DEA
- 2026–present: Taipei Fubon Braves

Career highlights
- Spanish League champion (2014); Spanish Cup winner (2013); Spanish 3rd Division MVP (2012); All-TPBL First Team (2026); All-Spanish League Team (2015); TPBL All-Defensive Second Team (2026); TPBL rebounds leader (2026)
- Stats at Basketball Reference

Marko Todorović (Serbian Cyrillic: Марко Тодоровић; born April 19, 1992) is a Montenegrin professional basketball player for the Taipei Fubon Braves of the Taiwanese P. League+. He is a 6 ft 11 in (2.11 m) tall power forward-center.

== Professional career ==
Todorović played basketball at the junior level with the youth teams of KK Joker in Montenegro and Joventut Badalona in Spain. He played with Joventut Badalona's second team, Prat Joventut, in the Spanish 3rd Division, from 2010 to 2012. He also played with the senior men's team of Joventut Badalona, in the Spanish ACB League, from 2011 to 2012.

Todorović joined Barcelona Bàsquet before the start of the 2012–13 season.

For the 2014–15 ACB season, Todorović was loaned from FC Barcelona to Bilbao Basket. He was named ACB Player of the Month on March 31, 2015.

On July 14, 2015, Todorović signed a three-year contract with the Russian club Khimki. On April 1, 2016, he was, again, loaned to Bilbao Basket for the rest of the 2015–16 season.

On September 28, 2018, Todorović returned to Divina Seguros Joventut for a second stint, signing a one-year deal.

On August 17, 2019, Todorović was reported to have signed with Tianjin Pioneers.

On August 13, 2021, he has signed with Real Betis Baloncesto of the Liga ACB.

On November 17, 2021, he has signed with Beijing Royal Fighters of the CBA.

On February 25, 2025, Todorović signed with the New Taipei CTBC DEA of the Taiwan Professional Basketball League (TPBL). On March 25, the New Taipei CTBC DEA announced that Todorović left the team due to personal reasons. On August 25, Todorović returned to the New Taipei CTBC DEA of the Taiwan Professional Basketball League (TPBL). He was the league's rebounds leader for the 2025–26 season. On May 9, 2026, Todorović was selected to the All-Defensive Second Team of the TPBL in 2025–26 season. On May 11, Todorović was selected to the All-TPBL First Team in 2025–26 season.

=== NBA draft rights ===
On June 27, 2013, Todorović was drafted 45th overall by the Portland Trail Blazers of the National Basketball Association. On July 10, 2013, the Trail Blazers traded his rights to the Houston Rockets as part of a trade for Thomas Robinson. It was reported on July 31, 2019, the Houston Rockets renounced their draft rights to Todorović.

== Montenegrin national team ==
Todorović was a member of the junior national teams of Montenegro. He played at the 2011 FIBA Europe Under-20 Championship. With the senior Montenegrin national basketball team, Todorović played at the 2017 EuroBasket.
