= 2026 TPBL draft =

3rd edition of the TPBL draft

General information
- Sport: Basketball
- Date: July 16, 2026
- Location: Taipei 101 The One (Taipei City)
- Network: TPBL on Youtube

Overview
- 8 total selections in 2 rounds
- League: Taiwan Professional Basketball League
- First selection: Adam Hinton (Kaohsiung Aquas)

The 2026 TPBL draft was the third edition of the Taiwan Professional Basketball League's annual draft. It was held on July 16, 2026, at Taipei 101 The One in Taipei City. There were seven teams joined the draft, including the Formosa Dreamers, Hsinchu Toplus Lioneers, Kaohsiung Aquas, New Taipei CTBC DEA, New Taipei Kings, Taipei Taishin Mars, and the Taoyuan Taiwan Beer Leopards. There were 28 players participated in the draft, and 8 players were chosen in 2 rounds.

== Draft results ==
G	Guard	F	Forward	C	Center

^{#}	Denotes player who has never appeared in one TPBL regular season or playoff game

Rnd.	Pick	Player	Pos.	Team	School / club team
1	1	Adam Hinton	G	Kaohsiung Aquas	Cornell (Sr.)
1	2	Wu Zhi-Kai	F	Taipei Taishin Mars	NCCU (Sr.)
1	3	Kuo Chia-An^{#}	F/C	New Taipei CTBC DEA	NTSU (Sr.)
1	4	Fu Yu	G/F	Hsinchu Toplus Lioneers	West Virginia Tech (Jr.)
1	5	Pan Wei-Jie	G	New Taipei Kings	UCH (Sr.)
2	6	Chen Ting-Lin^{#}	F/C	Kaohsiung Aquas	ISU (Sr.)
2	7	Ma Yo-Cheng^{#}	G	New Taipei CTBC DEA	UT (Jr.)
2	8	Benjamin Cheung^{#}	G	Hsinchu Toplus Lioneers	Occidental (Sr.)

- Reference：

== Draft combine ==
On June 1, the news reported that the TPBL cancelled the draft combine.

== Entrants ==
On June 30, the TPBL released its official list of entrants, consisting of 30 players from college and other educational institutions in this edition of the draft. On July 6, the TPBL announced that Wang Ting-Chun applied to quit the draft. On July 9, the TPBL announced that Shih Lu-Chi applied to quit the draft.

- (United States) (Taiwan) Maverick-Leet Chang – G, Evergreen State
- (Taiwan) Chen Bo-Cheng – F, CCU
- (Taiwan) Chen En – G, CYCU
- (Taiwan) Chen Hao-Yu – F/C, CYCU
- (Taiwan) Chen Ting-Lin – F/C, ISU
- (Taiwan) Chen Yu-Hsuan – F, CNU
- (Taiwan) Cheng Wen-Chieh – G, UT
- (United States) (Taiwan) Benjamin Cheung – G, Occidental
- (Taiwan) Fu Yu – G/F, West Virginia Tech
- (United States) (Taiwan) Adam Hinton – G, Cornell
- (Taiwan) Hsu Hao-Hsiang – G/F, CTBC
- (Taiwan) Hsu Hao-Yang – G/F, UT
- (Taiwan) Huang Chun-Chieh – F, NTUA
- (Taiwan) Kuo Chia-An – F/C, NTSU
- (Taiwan) Lee Yu-Che – G, NFU
- (Taiwan) Li Tsung-Han – G, CTBC
- (Taiwan) Liao Yin-Chen – G/F, SRHS
- (United States) (Taiwan) Ryan Lin – F, La Verne
- (Taiwan) Lin Tzu-Huan – G, Charleston
- (Taiwan) Liu En-Ren – G, CTBC
- (Russia) (Taiwan) Mark Lu – G, NTUB
- (Taiwan) Ma Yo-Cheng – G, UT
- (Taiwan) Pan Jian-Hong – F, FJU
- (Taiwan) Pan Wei-Jie – G, UCH
- (Taiwan) Tsai Ming-Chun – F, HWU
- (Taiwan) Tseng Wei-Ting – F/C, UT
- (Taiwan) Wang Chun-Kai – G/F, HWU
- (Taiwan) Wu Zhi-Kai – F, NCCU
