= Aleksandar Marelja =

Serbian basketball player

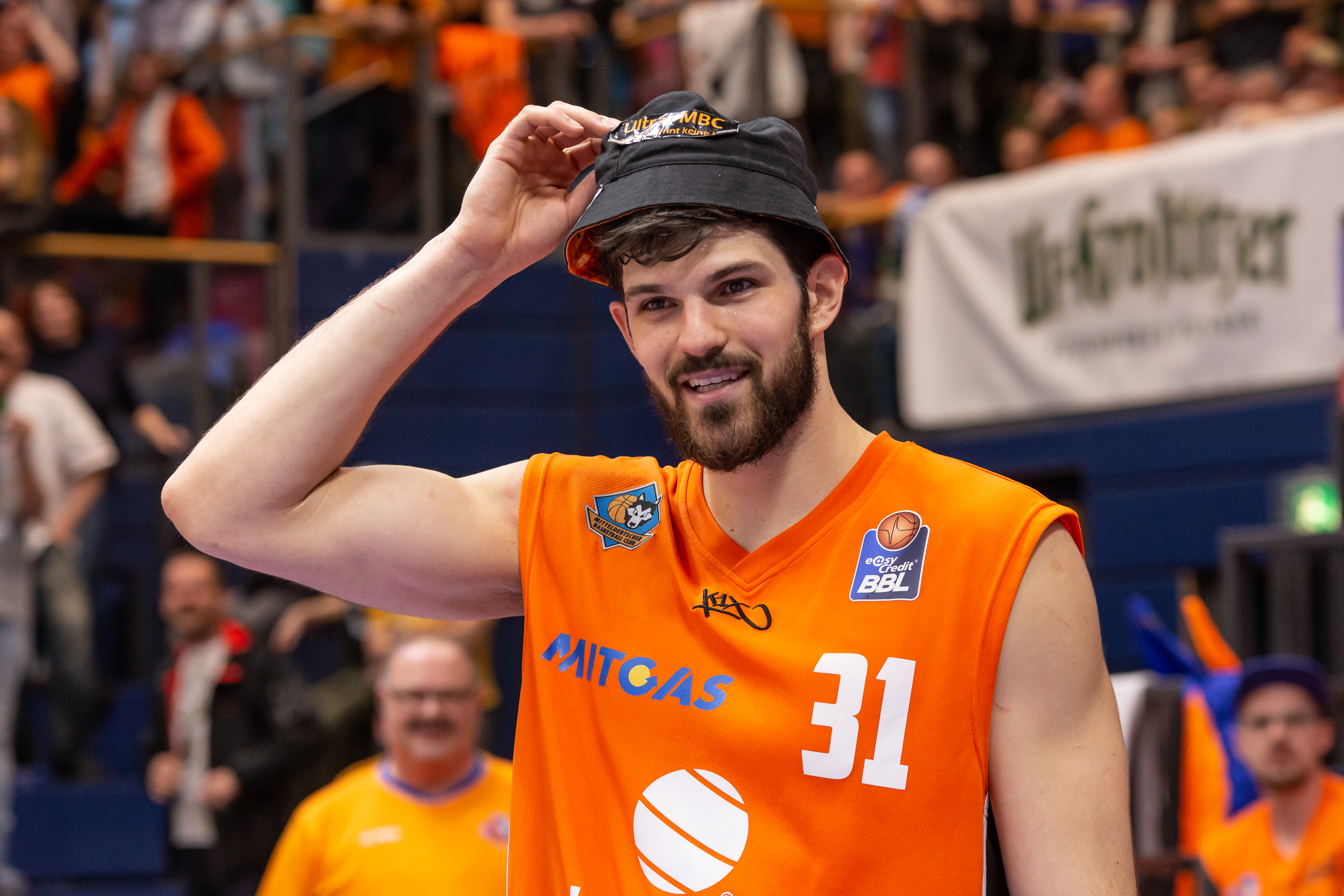
- Marelja in 2019

No. 17 – Taipei Taishin Mars
- Position: Power forward / center
- League: Taiwan Professional Basketball League

Personal information
- Born: December 6, 1992 (age 33) Belgrade, FR Yugoslavia
- Listed height: 2.07 m (6 ft 9 in)
- Listed weight: 107 kg (236 lb)

Career information
- NBA draft: 2014: undrafted
- Playing career: 2010–present

Career history
- 2010–2011: Radnički KG 06
- 2011–2013: Sloga Kraljevo
- 2013: Murcia
- 2013–2014: ABA Strumica
- 2014: Borac Čačak
- 2014: Mega Vizura
- 2015–2016: Oostende
- 2016: Vršac
- 2016–2017: Mega Leks
- 2017: Real Betis Energía Plus
- 2017: Antwerp Giants
- 2017–2018: AZS Koszalin
- 2018–2019: Mitteldeutscher
- 2019–2020: Löwen Braunschweig
- 2020–2021: Mitteldeutscher
- 2021–2023: Kazma
- 2023–2024: CBet Jonava
- 2024: Spartak Subotica
- 2024–2025: CS Dinamo București
- 2025–2026: KK SPD Radnički
- 2026–present: Taipei Taishin Mars

Aleksandar Marelja (Serbian: Александар Мареља; born December 6, 1992) is a Serbian professional basketball player for the Taipei Taishin Mars of the Taiwan Professional Basketball League (TPBL). Standing at 2.07 m (6 ft 9 1/2 in), he plays at the power forward position.

== Professional career ==
He began his career in the Zemun-based team Zemun Lasta where he played the whole 2009–10 season. He made his professional debut with Radnički KG 06 during the 2010–11 season. He then moved to Sloga Kraljevo in 2011 and played two good seasons with them. In May 2013, he signed a contract with the Spanish team Murcia until the end of season.

Over the summer he worked out with several teams, including Partizan, before finally signing a contract with the Macedonian team ABA Strumica in November 2013. In April 2014, he signed a contract with Borac Čačak until the end of season. Over 14 games in the Basketball League of Serbia, he averaged 13.1 points and 6.2 rebounds per game.

In the summer of 2014, he signed a contract with Mega Vizura. On 30 December 2014, he left Mega and signed with Belgian team Oostende. On 27 March 2016, he parted ways with Oostende.

In August 2016, Marelja signed with KK Vršac. On 21 December 2016, he left Vršac and returned to his former club Mega Leks. On 4 March 2017, he left Mega and signed with Spanish club Real Betis Energía Plus for the rest of the 2016–17 ACB season.

On 5 September 2017, Marelja signed with Belgian club Antwerp Giants. On 12 December 2017, he left Antwerp and signed with Polish club AZS Koszalin.

On 25 August 2019, he has signed with Löwen Braunschweig of the Basketball Bundesliga (BBL).

On 28 July 2020, he has signed with Syntainics MBC of the Basketball Bundesliga.

On 18 July 2021, Marelja signed for Kazma of the Kuwaiti Division I League.

On 16 August 2023, Marelja signed with CBet Jonava of the Lithuanian Basketball League (LKL).

On 29 February 2024, Marelja signed with Spartak Subotica.

On August 28, 2026, Marelja signed with the Taipei Taishin Mars of the Taiwan Professional Basketball League (TPBL).
