= Marvin Jones (basketball) =

American basketball player (born 1993)

No. 17 – New Taipei CTBC DEA
- Position: Center / power forward
- League: Taiwan Professional Basketball League

Personal information
- Born: December 29, 1993 (age 32) Chicago, Illinois, U.S.
- Listed height: 7 ft 0 in (213 cm)
- Listed weight: 231 lb (105 kg)

Career information
- High school: Thornton Township (Harvey, Illinois)
- College: Highland CC (2012–2014); Kent State (2015–2016); Texas Southern (2016–2017)
- NBA draft: 2017: undrafted
- Playing career: 2017–present

Career history
- 2017–2018: Kolossos Rodou
- 2018–2019: Petrol Olimpija
- 2019: Socar Petkimspor
- 2019–2020: Krka
- 2020: Promitheas Patras
- 2020–2021: Peristeri
- 2021–2022: PAOK Thessaloniki
- 2022: Leones de Ponce
- 2022–2023: Hapoel Holon
- 2023–2024: Budućnost
- 2024–2025: Bilbao
- 2025–2026: PAOK Thessaloniki
- 2026: Meralco Bolts
- 2026–present: New Taipei CTBC DEA

Career highlights
- FIBA Europe Cup champion (2025); SWAC Defensive Player of the Year (2017); SWAC Tournament MVP (2017)

Marvin Jermaine Jones (born December 29, 1993) is an American professional basketball player for the New Taipei CTBC DEA of the Taiwan Professional Basketball League (TPBL). He played college basketball for Highland CC, Kent State and Texas Southern.

== High school career ==
Jones played high school basketball at Thornton Township High School in Harvey, Illinois under head coach Troy Jackson. Jones was named to the NWI Times Illinois All-Area honorable mention honors as a senior and helped the Wildcats capture four consecutive regional championships. He also helped the Wolverines capture a state championship during his sophomore season.

== College career ==
As a freshman at Highland Community College, Jones averaged 1.6 points and 1.8 rebounds per game. As a sophomore, he earned NJCAA First Team All-Region IV honors after leading Highland to a 27–8 record and NJCAA Di National Tournament berth. He led the Scotties with 7.9 rebounds and 1.9 blocks per game while scoring 9.0 points per game and shooting 57.9% from the field. On 2014, Jones transferred to Kent State. With Kent State, he played in 27 games with one start and in 8.8 minutes he averaged 1.7 points and 1.9 rebounds per game with a total of seven blocks and four assists on the season. The following season he again transferred, to Texas Southern where he averaged 8.5 points, 6.8 rebounds, and 1.6 blocks per game, and at the end of the season, he was the SWAC Tournament MVP and the SWAC Defensive Player of the Year.

== Professional career ==
After going undrafted in the 2017 NBA draft, Jones joined Kolossos Rodou of the Greek Basket League. With Kolossos, he went on to average 10.4 points, 6.2 rebounds, and 1 block per game.

On June 15, 2018, he signed a two-year deal with Slovenian club Olimpija.

On January 28, 2020, Jones returned to Greece and signed with EuroCup club Promitheas Patras.

On July 17, 2020, he moved to BCL club Peristeri, also of the Greek Basket League. Jones was named player of the week on November 17, after posting 19 points adding eight rebounds for Peristeri in a victory against Charilaos Trikoupis. In 31 games overall with Peristeri, he averaged 9.1 points and 6.9 rebounds per contest.

On July 28, 2021, Jones signed a one-year contract with PAOK, his fourth Greek Basket League club. On March 19, 2022, he parted ways with the team. In 13 Greek Basket League games, Jones averaged a career-high of 15.7 points (shooting with 62% from the field), as well as 7.6 rebounds per contest.

On March 19, 2022, Jones signed with Leones de Ponce of the BSN. He averaged 9.6 points, 6.2 rebounds, and 1.4 blocks (7th in the league) per game.

On July 22, 2022, he signed with Hapoel Holon of the Israeli Basketball Premier League.

In 2023, Jones joined Budućnost Podgorica of the ABA League and averaged 6.2 points and 3.8 rebounds per game. On July 11, 2024, he signed with Surne Bilbao Basket of the Liga ACB.

On July 12, 2025, Jones made his return to PAOK.

On March 7, 2026, Jones signed with the Meralco Bolts of the Philippine Basketball Association (PBA) to replace Ismael Romero. On August 5, Jones signed with the New Taipei CTBC DEA of the Taiwan Professional Basketball League (TPBL).
