= Stanton Kidd =

American basketball player (born 1992)

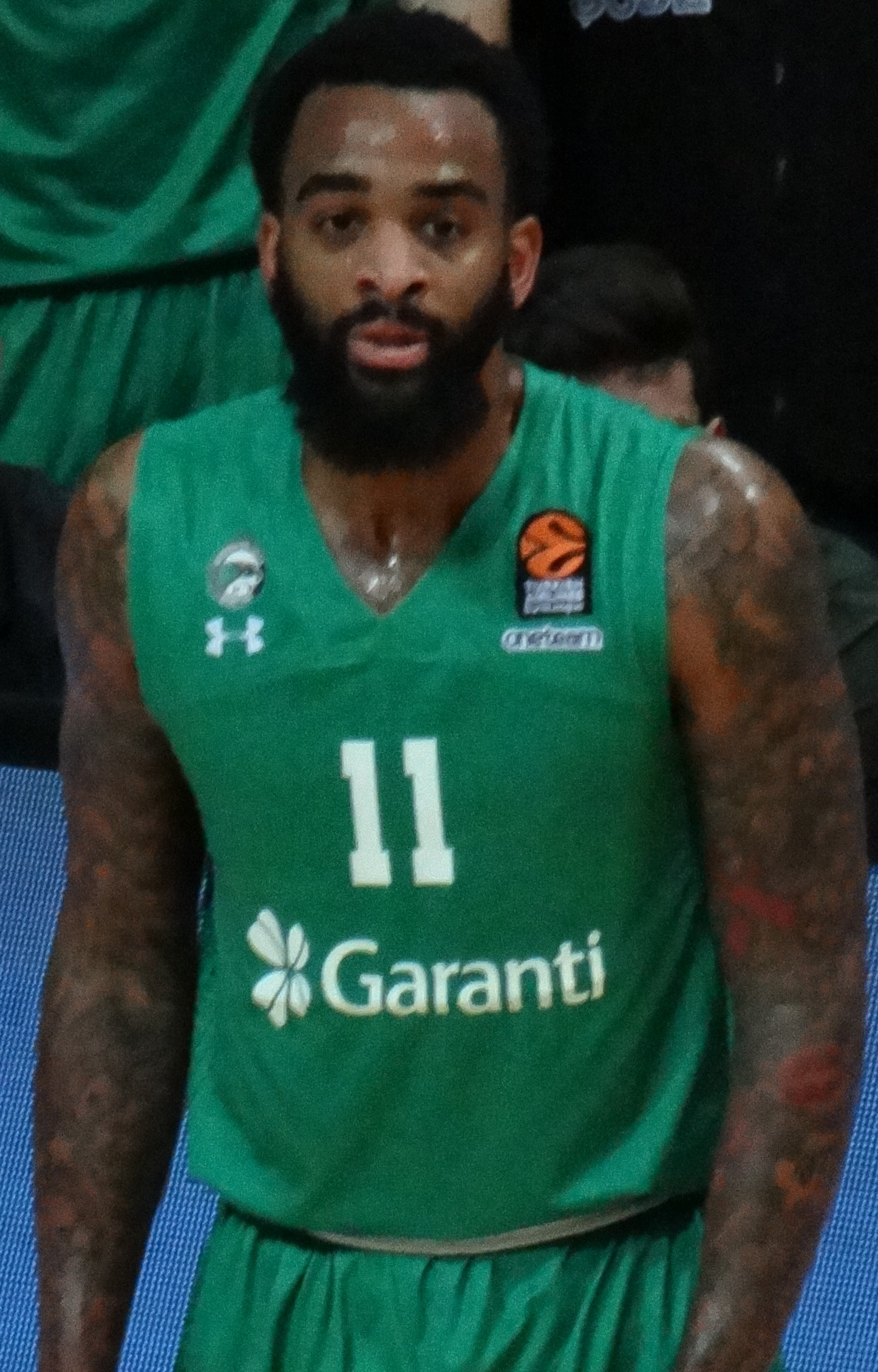
- Kidd with Darüşşafaka in 2018

No. 10 – Formosa Dreamers
- Position: Small forward / power forward
- League: Taiwan Professional Basketball League

Personal information
- Born: March 18, 1992 (age 34) Baltimore, Maryland, U.S.
- Listed height: 202 cm (6 ft 8 in)
- Listed weight: 101 kg (223 lb)

Career information
- High school: Edmondson-Westside (Baltimore, Maryland)
- College: South Plains (2010–2012); North Carolina Central (2012–2013); Colorado State (2014–2015)
- NBA draft: 2015: undrafted
- Playing career: 2015–present

Career history
- 2015–2016: Limburg United
- 2016–2017: Tigers Tübingen
- 2017–2019: Darüşşafaka
- 2019: Utah Jazz
- 2019–2020: Melbourne United
- 2020–2021: OGM Ormanspor
- 2021: Hapoel Jerusalem
- 2021–2022: Lokomotiv Kuban
- 2022–2023: Akita Northern Happinets
- 2023–2024: Shinshu Brave Warriors
- 2024–2025: Sendai 89ers
- 2025–2026: Taipei Taishin Mars
- 2026: Changsha Yongsheng
- 2026–present: Formosa Dreamers

Career highlights
- EuroCup champion (2018); First-team All-MEAC (2013); MWC Honorable Mention (2015)
- Stats at NBA.com
- Stats at Basketball Reference

Stanton Kidd (born March 18, 1992) is an American professional basketball player for the Formosa Dreamers of the Taiwan Professional Basketball League (TPBL). He played college basketball for South Plains College, North Carolina Central University and Colorado State before playing professionally in Belgium, Germany, Turkey and for the Utah Jazz of the National Basketball Association (NBA).

== Early life and college career ==
Kidd attended Edmondson-Westside High School in Baltimore, Maryland, where he averaged 23 points, 12 rebounds, and six assists in his senior year, leading the Red Storm to their first-ever Baltimore City Division I championship. Kidd was named the team MVP his senior season and earned all-metro player honors.

Kidd played two seasons at South Plains College, one of the top junior college programs in the nation, helping the Texans win the 2011–12 National Junior College Athletic Association National Championship going a perfect 36–0.

On March 10, 2013, Kidd was named First-team All-Mid-Eastern Athletic Conference in his first season at North Carolina Central University. He was third in the MEAC in scoring (14.5 points per game), eighth in rebounding (6.9 boards per game), fifth in field goal percentage (55.3 percent).

In his senior year at Colorado State, he averaged 11.5 points, 5 rebounds and 1.8 assists per game.

== Professional career ==
=== Limburg United (2015–2016) ===
On July 27, 2015, Kidd started his professional career with the Belgian team Limburg United, signing a one-year deal. Kidd helped Limburg reach the 2016 Belgian League Semifinals where they eventually lost to Oostende.

=== Tigers Tübingen (2016–2017) ===
On July 21, 2016, Kidd signed with the German team Tigers Tübingen for the 2016–17 season. In 20 games played for Tübingen, he averaged 12.8 points, 4.6 rebounds, 1.7 assists and 1.2 steals per game.

=== Darüşşafaka (2017–2019) ===
On July 21, 2017, Kidd signed a two-year deal with the Turkish team Darüşşafaka. On January 14, 2018, Kidd tied his career-high 24 points without missing a single shot, shooting 9-of-9 from the field, along with seven rebounds in a 98–65 win over Gaziantep. Kidd went on to win the 2018 EuroCup title with Darüşşafaka.

On June 28, 2018, Kidd joined the Utah Jazz for the 2018 NBA Summer League, where he averaged 10.8 points and 3.3 rebounds in six games.

=== Utah Jazz (2019) ===
On July 17, 2019, Kidd signed a contract with the Utah Jazz after completing stints with them in the 2019 NBA Summer League. On November 21, he was waived by the Jazz after playing three games.

=== Melbourne United (2019–2020) ===
On December 20, 2019, Kidd signed with Melbourne United for the 2019–20 NBL season as an injury replacement for Casey Prather.

=== Ormanspor (2020–2021) ===
On August 18, 2020, Kidd signed with OGM Ormanspor of the Basketball Super League.

=== Hapoel Jerusalem (2021) ===
On February 18, 2021, he signed with Hapoel Jerusalem of the Israeli Basketball Premier League.

=== Lokomotiv Kuban (2021–2022) ===
On July 8, 2021, he has signed with Lokomotiv Kuban of the VTB United League.

=== Taipei Taishin Mars (2025–2026) ===
On September 8, 2025, Kidd signed with the Taipei Taishin Mars of the Taiwan Professional Basketball League (TPBL).

On March 4, 2026, the Taipei Taishin Mars terminated the contract relationship with Kidd.

=== Changsha Yongsheng (2026) ===
In March 2026, Kidd signed with the Changsha Yongsheng of the National Basketball League (NBL).

=== Formosa Dreamers (2026–present) ===
On August 18, 2026, Kidd signed with the Formosa Dreamers of the Taiwan Professional Basketball League (TPBL).

== Career statistics ==
Legend
GP	Games played	GS	Games started	MPG	Minutes per game
FG%	Field goal percentage	3P%	3-point field goal percentage	FT%	Free throw percentage
RPG	Rebounds per game	APG	Assists per game	SPG	Steals per game
BPG	Blocks per game	PPG	Points per game	**Bold**	Career high

†	Denotes seasons in which Kidd won the EuroCup

=== NBA ===
==== Regular season ====
Year	Team	GP	GS	MPG	FG%	3P%	FT%	RPG	APG	SPG	BPG	PPG
2019–20	Utah	4	0	3.8	.000	.000	.000	.8	.3	.0	.0	.0
Career		4	0	3.8	.000	.000	.000	.8	.3	.0	.0	.0

=== EuroLeague ===
Year	Team	GP	GS	MPG	FG%	3P%	FT%	RPG	APG	SPG	BPG	PPG	PIR
2018–19	Darüşşafaka	30	18	21.8	.391	.284	.686	3.0	1.2	.6	.2	6.8	5.4
Career		30	18	21.8	.391	.284	.686	3.0	1.2	.6	.2	6.8	5.4

=== EuroCup ===
Year	Team	GP	GS	MPG	FG%	3P%	FT%	RPG	APG	SPG	BPG	PPG	PIR
2017–18	Darüşşafaka	22	6	17.1	.598	.463	.937	8.5	7.6	2.2	1.1	8.4	9.9
Career		22	6	17.1	.598	.463	.937	8.5	7.6	2.2	1.1	8.4	9.9

Source: RealGM
