= Nemanja Nenadić =

Serbian basketball player (born 1994)

No. 28 – New Taipei CTBC DEA
- Position: Shooting guard / point guard
- League: Taiwan Professional Basketball League

Personal information
- Born: 2 January 1994 (age 32) Belgrade, FR Yugoslavia
- Listed height: 1.97 m (6 ft 6 in)
- Listed weight: 88 kg (194 lb)

Career information
- NBA draft: 2016: undrafted
- Playing career: 2012–present

Career history
- 2012–2014: Slodes
- 2014–2015: Tamiš
- 2015: Mladost Zemun
- 2015–2016: Pirot
- 2016: Vojvodina Srbijagas
- 2016–2017: Dunav
- 2017–2018: FMP
- 2018–2020: Crvena zvezda
- 2019–2020: → Mega Bemax
- 2020–2021: FMP
- 2021–2022: Zastal Zielona Góra
- 2022–2023: Río Breogán
- 2023–2024: Limoges CSP
- 2024: Élan Chalon
- 2024–2025: Arka Gdynia
- 2025–2026: Gaziantep Basketbol
- 2026–present: New Taipei CTBC DEA

Career highlights
- Adriatic League champion (2019); Serbian League champion (2019); Adriatic Supercup winner (2018)

Nemanja Nenadić (Serbian Cyrillic: Немања Ненадић; born 2 January 1994) is a Serbian professional basketball player for the New Taipei CTBC DEA of the Taiwan Professional Basketball League (TPBL).

== Professional career ==
Nenadić played for Slodes, Tamiš, Pirot, Vojvodina Srbijagas and Dunav, all of the Serbian League and Serbian B League. On 5 August 2017, Nenadić signed a three-year deal with Serbian club FMP.

On 14 September 2018, Nenadić signed a three-year deal with Serbian powerhouse Crvena zvezda. On 23 September 2018, he made a debut for Crvena zvezda in the 2018 Adriatic Supercup Final against Budućnost VOLI.

On 21 July 2020, Nenadić signed a two-year contract with FMP. On 9 July 2021, he has signed with Stelmet Zielona Góra of the PLK.

On 24 June 2022 he signed with Río Breogán of the Spanish Liga ACB.

On 13 July 2023 he signed with Limoges CSP of the LNB Pro A.

On July 13, 2024, he signed with Élan Chalon of the LNB Pro A.

On December 5, 2024, he signed with Arka Gdynia of the Polish Basketball League (PLK).

On July 25, 2025, he signed with Gaziantep of the Türkiye Basketbol Ligi (TBL).

On September 29, 2026, Nenadić signed with the New Taipei CTBC DEA of the Taiwan Professional Basketball League (TPBL).

== National team career ==
Nenadić was a member of the Serbian university basketball team that participates at the 2017 Summer Universiade in Taipei.
