= Justin Alston =

No. 32 – Hsinchu Toplus Lioneers
- Position: Power forward / center
- League: Taiwan Professional Basketball League

Personal information
- Born: July 2, 1994 (age 32) Silver Spring, Maryland, U.S.
- Listed height: 204 cm (6 ft 8 in)
- Listed weight: 104 kg (229 lb)

Career information
- High school: Archbishop Carroll (Washington, D.C.)
- College: Boston University (2012–2017)
- NBA draft: 2017: undrafted
- Playing career: 2017–present

Career history
- 2017–2018: Gladiators Trier
- 2018–2019: Pärnu
- 2019–2020: Pécsi VSK
- 2020: CAB Madeira
- 2020–2021: Oliveirense
- 2021–2022: SZTE-Szedeák
- 2022–2023: Juventus Utena
- 2023: Shahrdari Gorgan
- 2023: Maccabi Ironi Ramat Gan
- 2023–2024: PAOK
- 2024–2025: Treviso Basket
- 2025: Hapoel Holon
- 2025–2026: Karşıyaka Basket
- 2026–present: Hsinchu Toplus Lioneers

Justin Alexander Alston (born July 2, 1994) is an American professional basketball player for the Hsinchu Toplus Lioneers of the Taiwan Professional Basketball League (TPBL). He plays as a power forward and center. He played college basketball for the Boston University Terriers before beginning his professional career in Europe in 2017.

== Early life and high school career ==
Alston was born in Silver Spring, Maryland, and grew up in the Washington, D.C. area. He attended Archbishop Carroll High School, where he played four years of basketball and served as team captain during his senior season. He averaged 11.4 points per game as a senior and received Maryland All-League honorable mention recognition. He was also invited to participate in the Capital Classics All-Star Game.

== College career ==
Alston played college basketball at Boston University from 2012 to 2017. He appeared in 22 games as a freshman during the 2012–13 season, averaging 1.4 points and 1.1 rebounds per game. His playing time increased during his sophomore season, when he averaged 2.8 points and 1.8 rebounds in 28 appearances.

During the 2014–15 season, Alston became a regular starter, averaging 8.3 points and 5.4 rebounds per game in 30 appearances. He played only eight games in the 2015–16 season due to injury, before returning for a fifth year of eligibility.

In his final collegiate season in 2016–17, Alston averaged 12.0 points and 6.3 rebounds per game while shooting 56.2 percent from the field. He earned Second Team All-Patriot League honors. Across his college career, he played 120 games and averaged 6.8 points and 4.0 rebounds per game.

=== College statistics ===
Season	Team	GP	MPG	PPG	RPG	APG	FG%
2012–13	Boston University	22	6.4	1.4	1.1	0.1	.519
2013–14	Boston University	28	8.6	2.8	1.8	0.1	.642
2014–15	Boston University	30	25.0	8.3	5.4	0.9	.571
2015–16	Boston University	8	22.1	8.8	4.9	1.5	.464
2016–17	Boston University	32	23.9	12.0	6.3	0.7	.562
Career		120	17.3	6.8	4.0	0.6	.561

== Professional career ==
=== Early career (2017–2020) ===
After going undrafted in the 2017 NBA draft, Alston began his professional career with Gladiators Trier in the German second division, ProA. During the 2017–18 season, he averaged 11.9 points and 5.5 rebounds per game in 25 appearances.

He subsequently played for Pärnu Sadam in Estonia during the 2018–19 season, following a brief spell with Pécsi VSK in Hungary. In the Latvian–Estonian Basketball League, he averaged 13.1 points and 6.3 rebounds per game.

Alston returned to Pécsi VSK for the 2019–20 season before joining Portuguese club CAB Madeira in January 2020. He averaged 20.8 points and 6.8 rebounds per game in six Portuguese league appearances.

=== Oliveirense (2020–2021) ===
In June 2020, Alston joined Oliveirense of the Portuguese Liga Portuguesa de Basquetebol. During the 2020–21 season, he averaged 15.8 points, 7.1 rebounds and 1.3 assists per game in 28 league appearances.

=== SZTE-Szedeák (2021–2022) ===
Alston moved to Hungary for the 2021–22 season, joining SZTE-Szedeák. He averaged 12.3 points and 6.4 rebounds per game across domestic and European competition. He also appeared in the qualifying rounds of the FIBA Europe Cup, averaging 22.0 points and 6.0 rebounds in two games.

=== Juventus Utena and Shahrdari Gorgan (2022–2023) ===
For the 2022–23 season, Alston signed with Juventus Utena of the Lithuanian LKL. He averaged 12.6 points, 5.7 rebounds and 1.3 assists in 35 games.

He later joined Iranian club Shahrdari Gorgan, representing the team in the West Asia Super League. In three games during the competition's Final 8 stage, he averaged 8.3 points and 8.7 rebounds.

=== PAOK (2023–2024) ===
Alston initially joined Israeli club Maccabi Ironi Ramat Gan for the 2023–24 season. Following the disruption of the Israeli basketball season, he moved to Greece.

On November 7, 2023, Alston signed with PAOK of the Greek Basket League.

During his time with PAOK, Alston averaged 12.9 points and 7.0 rebounds in 20 Greek league appearances. He also competed in the Basketball Champions League, averaging 7.4 points and 3.0 rebounds in five appearances.

=== Treviso Basket and Hapoel Holon (2024–2025) ===
In August 2024, Alston joined Treviso Basket of the Italian Lega Basket Serie A. He appeared in 15 league games, averaging 8.1 points and 3.9 rebounds per game.

In February 2025, he returned to Israel, signing with Hapoel Holon. He played 17 league games for the club, averaging approximately 14.7 points and 4.4 rebounds per game.

=== Karşıyaka (2025–2026) ===
Alston joined Karşıyaka Basket of the Turkish Basketbol Süper Ligi for the 2025–26 season. He appeared in 30 league games, averaging 7.7 points, 3.6 rebounds and 1.0 assists per game while shooting 38.0 percent from three-point range.

=== Hsinchu Toplus Lioneers (2026–present) ===
On August 26, 2026, Alston signed with the Hsinchu Toplus Lioneers of the Taiwan Professional Basketball League for the 2026–27 season. The move marked his first professional stint in Taiwan, following nine seasons playing in European and Asian leagues.
