= Brock Motum =

Australian basketball player

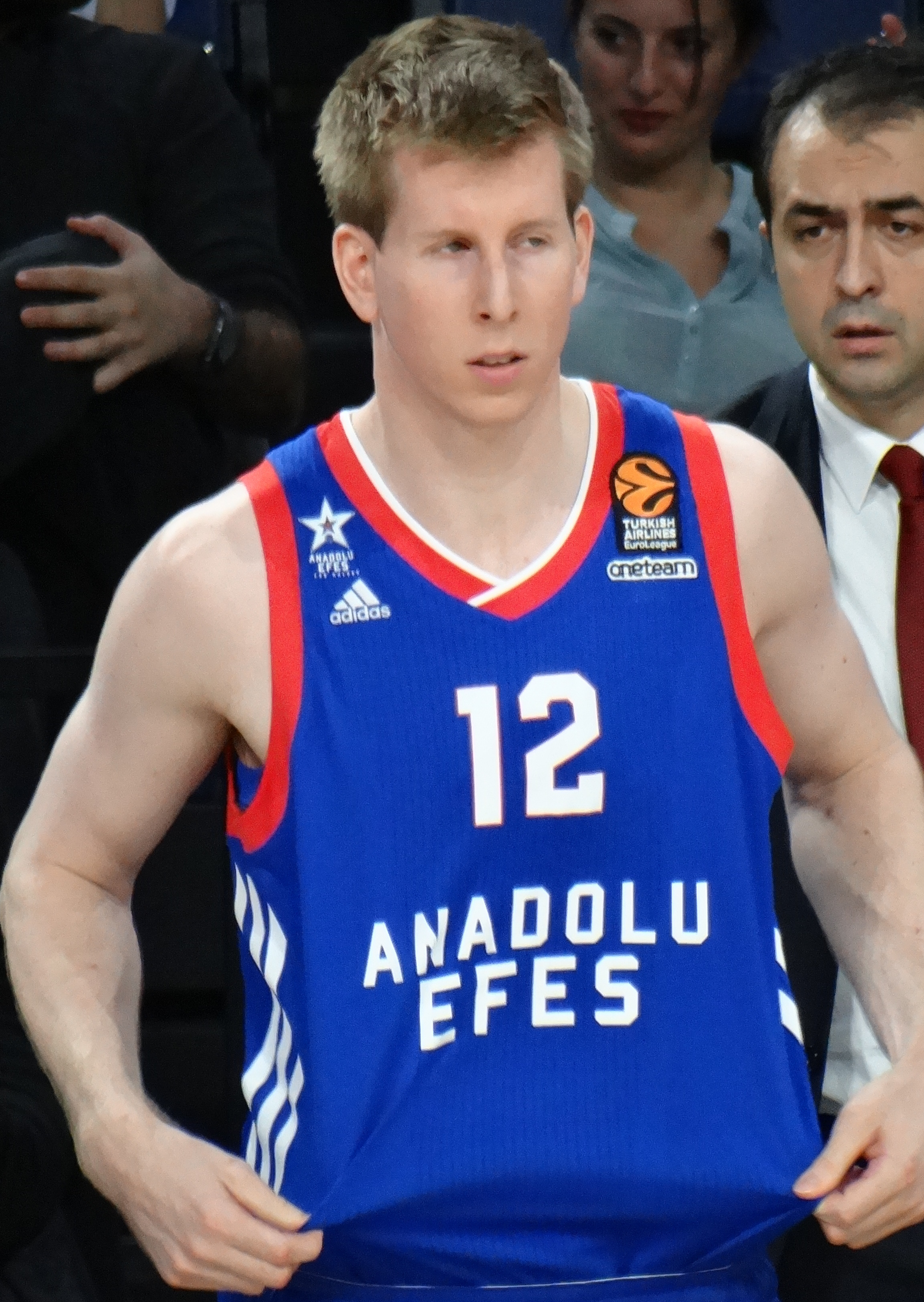
- Motum with Anadolu Efes in 2017

No. 10 – Taoyuan Taiwan Beer Leopards
- Position: Power forward
- League: Taiwan Professional Basketball League

Personal information
- Born: 16 October 1990 (age 36) Brisbane, Queensland, Australia
- Listed height: 208 cm (6 ft 10 in)
- Listed weight: 111 kg (245 lb)

Career information
- High school: Brisbane State (Brisbane, Queensland)
- College: Washington State (2009–2013)
- NBA draft: 2013: undrafted
- Playing career: 2013–present

Career history
- 2013–2014: Granarolo Bologna
- 2014–2015: Adelaide 36ers
- 2015–2017: Žalgiris
- 2017–2019: Anadolu Efes
- 2019–2020: Valencia
- 2020–2021: Galatasaray
- 2021: →Nanterre 92
- 2021–2022: Monaco
- 2022–2023: Levanga Hokkaido
- 2023–2025: Shiga Lakes
- 2025–2026: Toyama Grouses
- 2026–present: Taoyuan Taiwan Beer Leopards

Career highlights
- Turkish League champion (2019); 2× LKL champion (2016, 2017); Turkish Cup winner (2018); King Mindaugas Cup winner (2017); All-NBL First Team (2015); B.League scoring champion (2025); First-team All-Pac-12 (2012); Second-team All-Pac-12 (2013); Pac-12 Most Improved Player (2012)
- Stats at Basketball Reference

Brock William Motum (born 16 October 1990) is an Australian professional basketball player for the Taoyuan Taiwan Beer Leopards of the Taiwan Professional Basketball League (TPBL). He is a 6-foot-10-inch (2.08 m) power forward-centre and has played for the Australian national basketball team.

== Early life ==
Motum was born Brisbane, Queensland, in the suburb of Sunnybank. He played basketball at the Australian Institute of Sport in 2008 and 2009.

== College career ==
In 2009, he moved to the United States to play college basketball for the Washington State Cougars. In his four-year career, Motum scored 1,530 points (12.8 per game) and left WSU fifth on the school's all-time scoring list. As a junior in 2011–12, Motum averaged 18.0 points per game to lead the Pac-12 Conference. He was named first team All-Pac-12 and the league's Most Improved Player. In his senior year, he averaged 18.7 points per game and was named second team All-Pac-12.

== Professional career ==
=== Granarolo Bologna (2013–2014) ===
After going undrafted in the 2013 NBA draft, Motum joined the Philadelphia 76ers for the 2013 NBA Summer League. On 27 July 2013, he signed a two-year deal with Granarolo Bologna of the Lega Basket Serie A, with an NBA out-clause for 2014. In 25 games for Bologna in 2013–14, he averaged 8.3 points and 3.3 rebounds per game.

=== Adelaide 36ers (2014–2015) ===
After averaging 8.0 points and 4.6 rebounds over five Summer League games for the Utah Jazz, Motum signed a non-guaranteed contract with the franchise on 26 August 2014. He was later waived by the Jazz on 25 October 2014 after appearing in one preseason game.

On 3 November 2014, Motum signed a conditional two-year deal with the Adelaide 36ers of the National Basketball League. Backing up 7 ft 1 in (216 cm) Luke Schenscher at centre in his debut game on 9 November, Motum recorded 28 points and 6 rebounds in the 36ers' 100–107 loss to the Sydney Kings. While the 36ers lost their first seven games with Motum, they began a fightback effort to try and qualify for the 2014–15 NBL playoffs as they won eight out of their next 10 games. During this time with Schenscher restricted by an ankle injury, Motum moved to the starting lineup at power forward and 6 ft 11 in (211 cm) Daniel Johnson (who rejoined the club late in the season after a stint in Poland) playing at centre, with the two forming a formidable front court combination. On 23 January 2015, he was named Player of the Week for Round 15 after recording 31 points and 13 rebounds on 16 January against Perth, and 17 points and 11 rebounds on 18 January against Wollongong.

On 5 February 2015, Motum was named the Player of the Month for January after leading the 36ers to a monthly record of 5-1 while averaging 20.8 points over the six games. In 24 games for Adelaide in 2014–15, he averaged 17.5 points and 7.1 rebounds per game.

In June 2015, Motum exercised the NBA and European out clause in his contract with the 36ers, parting ways with the club.

=== Žalgiris (2015–2017) ===
In July 2015, Motum re-joined the Utah Jazz for the 2015 NBA Summer League. In eight Summer League games for the Jazz, he averaged 8.3 points and 3.9 rebounds per game.

On 4 August 2015, Motum signed a one-year deal, with the option of a second, with Žalgiris Kaunas of the Lithuanian Basketball League. On 7 August 2016, he re-signed with the team. Motum had an amazing second season, becoming one of the team leaders in the Euroleague, and in the LKL, turning the criticism of the first season to praise in the second one. During his time with Žalgiris, Motum won the LKL championships in 2016 and 2017, and the KMT Cup in 2017.

=== Anadolu Efes (2017–2019) ===
On 29 June 2017, Motum signed a one-year deal with Turkish club Anadolu Efes.

=== Valencia (2019–2020) ===
On 2 July 2019, Motum signed a two-year deal with Spanish club Valencia Basket. After averaging 5.9 points per game, he ended his contract on July 4, 2020.

=== Galatasaray (2020–2021) ===
On 10 August 2020, Motum signed with Galatasaray of the Basketball Super League and the Basketball Champions League.

=== Nanterre 92 (2021) ===
On 5 May 2021, Motum signed with Nanterre 92 of the LNB Pro A until the end of the season on loan.

=== Monaco (2021–2022) ===
On 2 September 2021, Motum signed with AS Monaco of the LNB Pro A.

=== Levanga Hokkaido (2022–2023) ===
On July 15, 2022, Motum signed with Levanga Hokkaido of the B.League.

=== Shiga Lakes (2023–2025) ===
On July 18, 2023, Motum signed with Shiga Lakes of the B.League.

=== Toyama Grouses (2025–2026) ===
On June 26, 2025, Motum signed with Toyama Grouses of the B.League.

=== Taoyuan Taiwan Beer Leopards (2026–present) ===
On August 10, 2026, Motum signed with the Taoyuan Taiwan Beer Leopards of the Taiwan Professional Basketball League (TPBL).

== Career statistics ==
Legend
GP	Games played	GS	Games started	MPG	Minutes per game
FG%	Field-goal percentage	3P%	3-point field-goal percentage	FT%	Free-throw percentage
RPG	Rebounds per game	APG	Assists per game	SPG	Steals per game
BPG	Blocks per game	PPG	Points per game	PIR	Performance index rating
**Bold**	Career high

=== EuroLeague ===
*	Led the league

Year	Team	GP	GS	MPG	FG%	3P%	FT%	RPG	APG	SPG	BPG	PPG	PIR
2015–16	Žalgiris	24	3	17.2	.485	.351	.750	2.8	.5	.5	—	6.7	5.1
2016–17	Žalgiris	30	0	**23.1**	.539	.462	.709	**3.4**	.5	**.6**	**.1**	**10.8**	**9.5**
2017–18	Anadolu Efes	29	**14**	19.2	.475	.384	**.967***	3.0	**.7**	.3	—	8.7	7.6
2018–19	Anadolu Efes	**31**	1	11.6	.506	.440	.781	1.8	.4	.1	**.1**	6.5	5.6
2019–20	Valencia	20	3	13.0	.483	.387	.806	1.5	.5	.4	**.1**	6.2	5.3
2021–22	Monaco	30	1	9.1	**.552**	**.556**	.909	1.1	.3	.2	**.1**	3.3	2.8
Career		164	22	15.6	.506	.426	.798	2.3	.5	.4	.1	7.1	6.0

== International career ==
Motum first represented Australia in the 2009 FIBA Under-19 World Championship in Auckland, New Zealand, helping the team to a 7–2 record and a fourth-place finish. Motum led the tournament in field goal percentage, shooting .600 from the floor.

On 28 July 2014, he was named to the 2014 Boomers' squad for the 2014 FIBA Basketball World Cup in Spain.

== Personal ==
Motum is the son of Greg and Leonie Motum, and has a sister, Anna.

On 15 August 2017, he proposed to former Žalgiris TV presenter Martyna Marmaitė which he met while playing for Žalgiris Kaunas.
