= Vladimír Brodziansky =

Slovak basketball player (born 1994)

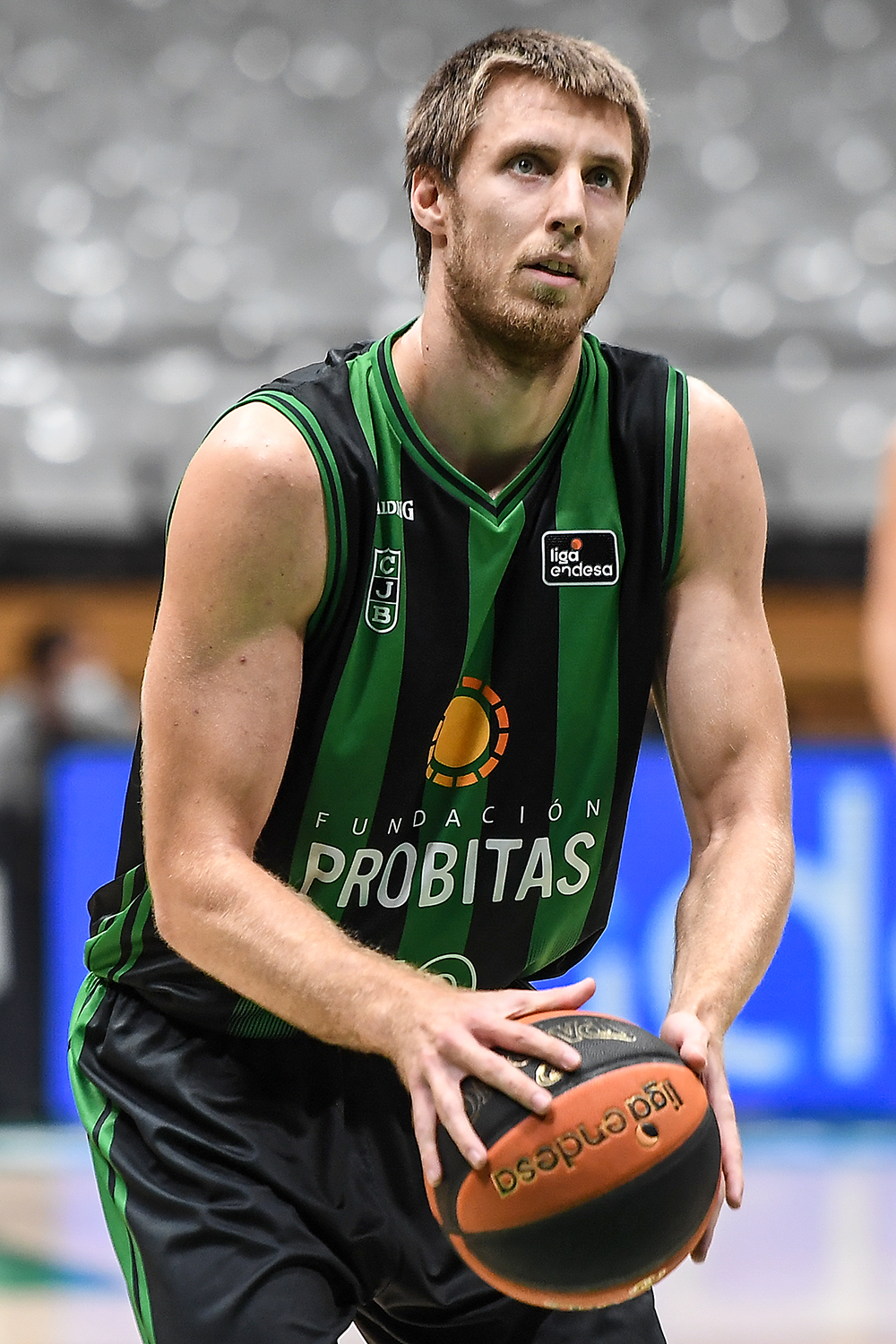
- Brodziansky playing with Joventut Badalona

No. 20 – New Taipei CTBC DEA
- Position: Power forward / center
- League: Taiwan Professional Basketball League

Personal information
- Born: 8 May 1994 (age 32) Prievidza, Slovakia
- Listed height: 211 cm (6 ft 11 in)
- Listed weight: 105 kg (231 lb)

Career information
- College: Pratt CC (2014–2015); TCU (2015–2018)
- NBA draft: 2018: undrafted
- Playing career: 2018–present

Career history
- 2018–2020: Obradoiro CAB
- 2020–2022: Joventut Badalona
- 2022: Bahçeşehir Koleji
- 2022–2023: Partizan Belgrade
- 2023–2024: Joventut Badalona
- 2024–2025: Murcia
- 2025: Suke Lions
- 2025–2026: Fujian Sturgeons
- 2026–present: New Taipei CTBC DEA

Career highlights
- NIT champion (2017); Second-team All-Big 12 (2017); Third-team All-Big 12 (2018)

Vladimír Brodziansky (born 8 May 1994) is a Slovak professional basketball player for the New Taipei CTBC DEA of the Taiwan Professional Basketball League (TPBL). He played college basketball for the TCU Horned Frogs.

== College career ==
Brodziansky is a native of Prievidza, Slovakia and moved to the United States in August 2014. He enrolled at Pratt Community College and played one season, where he averaged 15.3 points and 8.8 rebounds per game. Afterwards, he transferred to TCU to play under Trent Johnson.

After coach Jamie Dixon arrived in 2016, he worked to improve Brodziansky's strength, weight and endurance. He had 25 points, 14 rebounds and three blocks as TCU defeated Iowa State 84-77 on 16 January 2016. This effort earned him Big 12 player of the week honors. As a junior, Brodziansky was named to the Second Team All-Big 12 and Defensive Team. He was a key contributor on the team that won the NIT as a junior. He averaged 14.1 points per game, and his 82 blocks was the second-highest single season tally in school history.

Coming into his senior season, he was named to the Preseason Big 12 team. Brodzianky averaged 15.1 points, 5.1 rebounds and 1.6 blocks per game as a senior. He shot 57.7% from the field, third in the Big 12. Brodziansky was a finalist for the Senior CLASS Award and the Kareem Abdul-Jabber Center of the Year Award. As a senior, he was named to the Third Team All-Big 12. He led TCU to a 21-12 record and 6 seed in the NCAA Tournament. In his final game as a Horned Frog, a 57-52 upset loss to Syracuse, Brodziansky scored 13 points.

== Professional career ==
Brodziansky went undrafted in the 2018 NBA draft but was signed by the Cleveland Cavaliers in the NBA Summer League. On 31 July 2018, he signed with Obradoiro CAB of the Liga ACB.

On 1 July 2020, he has signed with Club Joventut Badalona of the Liga ACB.

On June 10, 2022, he has signed with Bahçeşehir Koleji of the Turkish Basketball Super League (BSL).

On November 11, 2022, he signed with Partizan Belgrade of the Serbian KLS and the Adriatic League.

On February 1, 2023, he signed with Club Joventut Badalona of the Liga ACB.

On July 3, 2024, he signed with UCAM Murcia of the Spanish Liga ACB.

On August 13, 2026, Brodziansky signed with the New Taipei CTBC DEA of the Taiwan Professional Basketball League (TPBL).
