= Mathias Fischer (basketball) =

German professional basketball coach

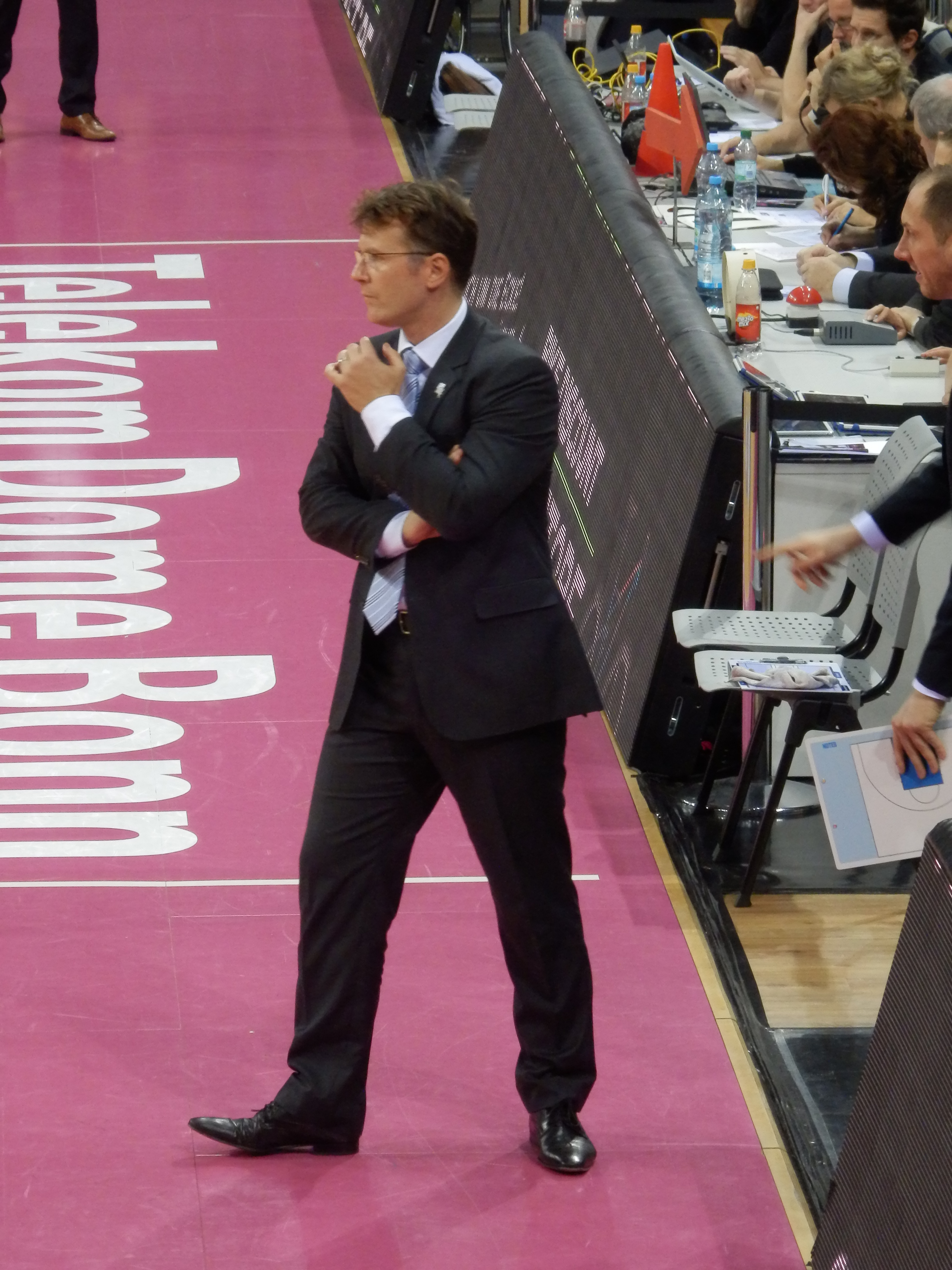
- Fischer coaching Bonn in 2015

New Taipei CTBC DEA
- Position: Head coach
- League: Taiwan Professional Basketball League

Personal information
- Born: July 30, 1971 (age 55) Koźle, Silesia, Poland

Career history

Coaching
- 2000–2003: Rhöndorfer TV (assistant)
- 2003: Brandt Hagen (assistant)
- 2004: Amicale Steinsel (assistant)
- 2004–2006: RheinEnergie Köln (assistant)
- 2007–2008: Black Star Mersch
- 2008–2009: Wörthersee Piraten
- 2009–2012: Swans Gmunden
- 2012–2013: Giessen 46ers
- 2013–2015: Telekom Baskets Bonn
- 2016–2017: Turów Zgorzelec
- 2017–2019: Tigers Tübingen
- 2019–2022: Nishinomiya Storks
- 2022–2024: Osaka Evessa
- 2024–2025: Kaohsiung Aquas
- 2026–present: New Taipei CTBC DEA

Career highlights
- As coach: German Cup winner (2005); German League champion (2006); Austrian League All-Star Game head coach (2010); Austrian Cup winner (2012)

Mathias Fischer (born July 30, 1971) is a German professional basketball coach and former player. He is the head coach of New Taipei CTBC DEA of the Taiwan Professional Basketball League (TPBL).

== Coaching career ==
=== Club career ===
Fischer began his coaching career as an assistant coach with Rhöndorfer TV in 2000 before he took assistant coach positions for Brandt Hagen, BBC Amicale Steinsel and RheinEnergie Köln. Fischer took his first head coach position for the Luxembourg team Black Star Mersch in 2004. Fischer eventually moved to Worthersee Piraten, Allianz Swans Gmunden, and Giessen 46ers. Fischer was appointed head coach of Telekom Baskets Bonn on 5 June 2013.

On July 10, 2024, Fischer was hired as the head coach of the Kaohsiung Aquas of the Taiwan Professional Basketball League (TPBL).

On July 24, 2025, Fischer was re-signed as the head coach of the Kaohsiung Aquas of the Taiwan Professional Basketball League (TPBL). On December 31, the Kaohsiung Aquas announced to terminate contract relationship with Fischer, and named Zhu Yong-Hong, the Kaohsiung Aquas assistant coach, as their interim head coach.

On July 15, 2026, Fischer was hired as the head coach of the New Taipei CTBC DEA of the Taiwan Professional Basketball League (TPBL).

=== Luxembourg national team ===
Fischer coached the Luxembourg national team in 2007.

== Awards and accomplishments ==
=== Coaching career ===
- German League Champion: (2006)
- German Cup Champion: (2005)
- Austrian Cup Champion: (2012)
