= Taipei Taishin Mars =

Professional basketball team in Taiwan

- 2026–27 Taipei Taishin Mars season
- Leagues: Taiwan Professional Basketball League
- Founded: July 6, 2023
- History: Taipei Mars; 2023–2024 (T1); Taipei Taishin Mars; 2024–present (TPBL)
- Arena: Taipei Heping Basketball Gymnasium
- Capacity: 7,000
- Location: Taipei City, Taiwan
- Team colors: Red, black, white
- CEO: Huang Wan-Lung
- President: Yang Yuan-Ming
- General manager: Lin You-Ting
- Head coach: Gianluca Tucci
- Ownership: TS Financial Holdings
- Championships: 0
- Website: taipeimars.com.tw

The Taipei Taishin Mars (Chinese: 臺北台新戰神) are a Taiwanese professional basketball team based in Taipei City. They have competed in the Taiwan Professional Basketball League (TPBL) and play their home games at the Taipei Heping Basketball Gymnasium. The Mars joined the T1 League since the 2023–24 season, and became one of the seven teams of the inaugural TPBL season.

== Franchise history ==
On June 6, 2023, the Taishin Financial Holdings announced to establish the Taishin Sports Entertainment Co., Ltd. On June 26, the T1 League announced that the Taishin Sports Entertainment Co., Ltd. took over the participation rights of the TaiwanBeer HeroBears. On August 24, the team was announced as the Taipei Taishin Mars.

On July 9, 2024, the Taipei Taishin Mars announced to join the Taiwan Professional Basketball League (TPBL).

== Facilities ==
=== Home arenas ===
Arena	Location	Duration
Hsinchu County Stadium	Hsinchu County	2025
National Taiwan University Sports Center	Taipei City	2024
Taipei Dome	Taipei City	2024 (co-home arena with DEA)
Taipei Heping Basketball Gymnasium	Taipei City	2023–present

== Current roster ==
Taipei Taishin Mars roster
Players
Coaches

Pos.	No.	Nat.	Name	Ht.	Wt.	Age	From
SG	0	(Taiwan)	Lin Ting-Chien	1.92 m (6 ft 4 in)	85 kg (187 lb)	27 – 31 October 1999	Bryant
PG	2	(Taiwan)	Ting Sheng-Ju	1.74 m (5 ft 9 in)	75 kg (165 lb)	28 – 22 August 1998	St. Francis
PG	5	(Taiwan) (Vietnam)	Wei Peng-Ho (injured)	1.77 m (5 ft 10 in)	72 kg (159 lb)	23 – 3 January 2003	NTNU
SF	6	(Taiwan)	Chiang Chun	1.93 m (6 ft 4 in)	93 kg (205 lb)	25 – 11 September 2001	FJU
PF	7	(Taiwan)	Liu Yen-Ting	1.96 m (6 ft 5 in)	96 kg (212 lb)	26 – 7 January 2000	OCU
SF	8	(Taiwan)	Chen Wen-Hung (C)	1.88 m (6 ft 2 in)	98 kg (216 lb)	35 – 14 July 1991	NTSU
PF	10	(United States)	Bryan Griffin (I)	2.03 m (6 ft 8 in)	107 kg (236 lb)	28 – 30 April 1998	Xavier
SF	11	(Taiwan)	Huang Tsung-Han	1.93 m (6 ft 4 in)	96 kg (212 lb)	32 – 7 July 1994	MDU
SG	14	(Taiwan)	Wu Yung-Cheng (injured)	1.86 m (6 ft 1 in)	82 kg (181 lb)	30 – 19 October 1996	Sacramento State
SG	15	(Taiwan)	Xie Ming-Jun (injured)	1.90 m (6 ft 3 in)	85 kg (187 lb)	21 – 11 November 2005	SCA
C	16	(Taiwan)	Wang Sheng-Lin	2.05 m (6 ft 9 in)	105 kg (231 lb)	25 – 1 December 2000	LIT
SF	17	(Serbia)	Aleksandar Marelja (I)	2.07 m (6 ft 9 in)	107 kg (236 lb)	33 – 6 December 1992	Serbia
SF	23	(Taiwan)	Wu Zhi-Kai	1.96 m (6 ft 5 in)	90 kg (198 lb)	23 – 19 September 2003	NCCU
PG	25	(United States)	Tyrus McGee (I)	1.88 m (6 ft 2 in)	93 kg (205 lb)	35 – 14 March 1991	Iowa State
SF	33	(Taiwan) (United States)	Samuel Manu	1.97 m (6 ft 6 in)	91 kg (201 lb)	26 – 24 September 2000	UC Davis
C	34	(Croatia)	Marin Marić (I)	2.11 m (6 ft 11 in)	113 kg (249 lb)	32 – 21 February 1994	DePaul
C	62	(Taiwan)	Chen Kuan-Chuan	1.97 m (6 ft 6 in)	105 kg (231 lb)	32 – 30 December 1993	NTSU

Head coach

- (Italy) Gianluca Tucci

Assistant coach(es)

- (Taiwan) Hsu Hao-Cheng
- (Taiwan) Chen Shih-Nien
- (Taiwan) Hsu Shih-Ching

Strength & conditioning coach(es)

- (Taiwan) Chen Sheng-Chuan
- (Taiwan) Liu Yu-Jie

Athletic trainer(s)

- (Taiwan) Chien Shao-Fu
- (Taiwan) Wan Ting-Hsuan

Team manager

- (Taiwan) Lin You-Ting

Legend

- (C) Team captain
- (I) Import player
- Injured

- Roster
- Transactions
Updated: November 15, 2026

== Season-by-season record ==
Season	League	Coach	Regular season				Postseason	Asian competition					
Season	League	Coach	Won	Lost	Win %	Finish	Postseason	League	Won	Lost	Win %	Finish	Result
2023–24	T1	Brian Adams	11	17	.393	4th	Won semifinals (DEA) 3–2; Lost finals (Leopards) 0–4	Did not participate					
2023–24	T1	Hsu Hao-Cheng	11	17	.393	4th	Won semifinals (DEA) 3–2; Lost finals (Leopards) 0–4	Did not participate					
2024–25	TPBL	Hsu Hao-Cheng	16	20	.444	4th	Won play-in (Leopards) 2–1; Lost semifinals (Kings) 0–4	Did not participate					
2025–26	TPBL	Hsu Hao-Cheng	11	25	.306	6th	Did not qualify	Did not participate					
2025–26	TPBL	Milan Stevanovic	11	25	.306	6th	Did not qualify	Did not participate					
2026–27	TPBL	Gianluca Tucci	2	2	.500			Did not participate					
Totals			40	64	.385	–	2 Playoff appearances	–	0	0	–	–	0 Playoff appearances

== Notable players ==
Local players

- (Taiwan) Chen Kuan-Chuan (陳冠全) – Chinese Taipei national team player
- (Taiwan) Chiang Chun (江均) – Chinese Taipei national team player
- (Taiwan) Huang Tsung-Han (黃聰翰) – Chinese Taipei national team player
- (Taiwan) Lin Ping-Sheng (林秉聖) – Chinese Taipei national team player
- (Taiwan) Lin Ting-Chien (林庭謙) – Chinese Taipei national team player
- (Taiwan) Lin Yi-Huei (林宜輝) – Chinese Taipei national team player
- (Taiwan) (United States) Samuel Manu (雷蒙恩) – Chinese Taipei national team player
- (Taiwan) Su Yi-Chin (蘇奕晉) – Chinese Taipei national team player
- (Taiwan) Sun Szu-Yao (孫思堯) – Chinese Taipei national team player
- (Taiwan) Ting Sheng-Ju (丁聖儒) – Chinese Taipei national team player
- (Taiwan) Wang Lu-Hsiang (王律翔) – Chinese Taipei national team player
- (Taiwan) Wu Yung-Cheng (吳永盛) – Chinese Taipei national team player

Import players

- (United States) Jeantal Cylla – Haiti national team player
- Micheal Eric – Nigeria national team player
- Michael Frazier – NBA player, United States national team player
- (United States) Stanton Kidd – NBA player
- Vladyslav Koreniuk – Ukraine national team player
- (United States) Zach Lofton – NBA player
- (Australia) Makur Maker – South Sudan national team player
- Marin Marić – Croatia national team player
- (United States) Ray McCallum – NBA player
- (United States) Erik McCree – NBA player
- (United States) Malcolm Miller – NBA player
- Adrien Moerman – France national team player, LNB Pro B MVP (2008), LNB Pro A MVP (2015)
- (United States) (United Kingdom) Byron Mullens – NBA player
- Youssou Ndoye – Senegal national team player
- (United States) (Lebanon) Thomas Robinson – NBA player
- (United States) Diamond Stone – NBA player
- (United States) Darral Willis – Cyprus national team player, Cypriot Basketball Cup MVP (2019)
- Ihor Zaytsev – Ukraine national team player
