= New Taipei CTBC DEA =

Professional basketball team in Taiwan

- 2026–27 New Taipei CTBC DEA season
- Leagues: Taiwan Professional Basketball League
- Founded: July 30, 2021
- History: New Taipei CTBC DEA; 2021–2024 (T1); 2024–present (TPBL)
- Arena: Xinzhuang Gymnasium
- Capacity: 6,800
- Location: New Taipei City, Taiwan
- Team colors: Dark blue, yellow
- President: Chen Kuo-En
- General manager: Chen Hui
- Head coach: Mathias Fischer
- Ownership: CTBC Financial Holding
- Championships: 1 T1: 1 (2023)
- Website: ctbcdea.com.tw

The New Taipei CTBC DEA (Chinese: 新北中信特攻) are a Taiwanese professional basketball team based in New Taipei City. They have competed in the Taiwan Professional Basketball League (TPBL) and play their home games at the Xinzhuang Gymnasium. The DEA became one of the six teams of the inaugural T1 League season, and one of the seven teams of the inaugural TPBL season.

== Franchise history ==
The New Taipei CTBC DEA announced their establishment on July 30, 2021, name "DEA" was inspired from the Drug Enforcement Administration, one of United States federal law enforcement agencies.

On August 4, 2021, the New Taipei CTBC DEA acquired 1st round pick from Kaohsiung Aquas. Later in the 2021 draft, they drafted Shih Hsin small forward Mohammad Al Bachir Gadiaga and Chien Hsin Tech shooting guard Hsieh Ya-Hsuan. Bachir lived in Taiwan since he was 8 years old, and he was also the second naturalization player of the Chinese Taipei men's national basketball team.

On May 21, 2023, the New Taipei CTBC DEA defeated the Tainan TSG GhostHawks, 4–0, winning the 2022–23 season championship.

On July 9, 2024, the New Taipei CTBC DEA announced to join the Taiwan Professional Basketball League (TPBL).

== Facilities ==
=== Home arenas ===
Arena	Location	Duration
Taipei Dome	Taipei City	2024 (co-home arena with Mars)
Taipei Heping Basketball Gymnasium	Taipei City	2026
Xinzhuang Gymnasium	New Taipei City	2021–present

=== Training facilities ===
The DEA's training facility is located at the CTBC administration building.

== Current roster ==
New Taipei CTBC DEA roster
Players
Coaches

Pos.	No.	Nat.	Name	Ht.	Wt.	Age	From
F	0	(Taiwan)	Mohammad Al Bachir Gadiaga	1.89 m (6 ft 2 in)	92 kg (203 lb)	28 – 27 April 1998	SHU
F	1	(Taiwan)	Li Ruei-Ci	1.93 m (6 ft 4 in)	87 kg (192 lb)	33 – 7 January 1993	TSU
G	3	(United States) (Taiwan)	Walter Lum	1.75 m (5 ft 9 in)	75 kg (165 lb)	26 – 24 February 2000	Whitman
G	5	(Taiwan)	Yu Wei-Hao	1.74 m (5 ft 9 in)	70 kg (154 lb)	25 – 24 October 2001	NTUA
G	7	(Taiwan)	Wei Chia-Hao (injured) (C)	1.82 m (6 ft 0 in)	78 kg (172 lb)	26 – 13 January 2000	FJU
G	8	(Taiwan)	Ma Yo-Cheng	1.80 m (5 ft 11 in)	75 kg (165 lb)	23 – 8 October 2003	UT
G	10	(Taiwan)	Hsieh Ya-Hsuan	1.87 m (6 ft 2 in)	81 kg (179 lb)	28 – 30 October 1998	UCH
F	12	(Taiwan)	Lin Jen-Hung	1.94 m (6 ft 4 in)	85 kg (187 lb)	32 – 18 December 1993	NTNU
F	14	(Taiwan)	Tseng Hsin-Wu	1.95 m (6 ft 5 in)	90 kg (198 lb)	23 – 22 March 2003	NTNU
G	16	(Taiwan)	Lin Wei-Han	1.80 m (5 ft 11 in)	75 kg (165 lb)	36 – 9 July 1990	FJU
PF/C	17	(United States)	Marvin Jones (I)	2.13 m (7 ft 0 in)	105 kg (231 lb)	32 – 29 December 1993	Texas Southern
PF/C	20	(Slovakia)	Vladimír Brodziansky (injured) (I)	2.11 m (6 ft 11 in)	105 kg (231 lb)	32 – 8 May 1994	TCU
F	22	(Taiwan)	Huang Hung-Han	1.92 m (6 ft 4 in)	92 kg (203 lb)	32 – 15 October 1994	UCH
G	24	(Taiwan)	Jian Ting-Jhao	1.80 m (5 ft 11 in)	80 kg (176 lb)	28 – 16 January 1998	UCH
G/F	28	(Serbia)	Nemanja Nenadić (I)	1.97 m (6 ft 6 in)	88 kg (194 lb)	32 – 2 January 1994	Serbia
PF	61	(United States)	Clay Mounce (I)	2.00 m (6 ft 7 in)	98 kg (216 lb)	28 – 12 March 1998	Furman
C	76	(Taiwan)	Tseng Wen-Ting	2.04 m (6 ft 8 in)	98 kg (216 lb)	42 – 6 July 1984	TPEC
G	77	(Taiwan)	Li Pei-Cheng	1.81 m (5 ft 11 in)	79 kg (174 lb)	26 – 25 October 2000	FJU

Head coach

- (Germany) Mathias Fischer

Assistant coach(es)

- (Norway) Mathias Eckhoff
- (United States) (Republic of Ireland) Chris O'Shea

Strength & conditioning coach(es)

- (Taiwan) Chiang Cheng-Han
- (Taiwan) Wu Sheng-Han

Athletic trainer(s)

- (Taiwan) Fan Hsiang-Yu
- (Taiwan) Li Kuo-Yi

Team manager

- (Taiwan) Chen Hui

Legend

- (C) Team captain
- (I) Import player
- Injured

- Roster
- Transactions
Updated: November 22, 2026

== Head coaches ==
Name	Tenure	Totals				Regular season				Playoffs			
Name	Tenure	G	W	L	PCT	G	W	L	PCT	G	W	L	PCT
(Taiwan) Lee Yi-Hua	2021–2025	139	87	52	.626	124	77	47	.621	15	10	5	.667
(Serbia) Momir Ratkovic	2025–2026	38	20	18	.526	36	20	16	.556	2	0	2	.000
(Germany) Mathias Fischer	2026–present	5	3	2	.600	5	3	2	.600	–	–	–	–
Totals		182	110	72	.604	165	100	65	.606	17	10	7	.588

== Season-by-season record ==
Season	League	Coach	Regular season				Postseason	Asian competition					
Season	League	Coach	Won	Lost	Win %	Finish	Postseason	League	Won	Lost	Win %	Finish	Result
2021–22	T1	Lee Yi-Hua	17	13	.567	3rd	Lost semifinals (Suns) 1–2	Did not participate					
2022–23	T1	Lee Yi-Hua	25	5	.833	1st	Won semifinals (Suns) 3–0; Won finals (GhostHawks) 4–0	Did not participate					
2023–24	T1	Lee Yi-Hua	19	9	.679	1st	Lost semifinals (Mars) 2–3	Did not participate					
2024–25	TPBL	Lee Yi-Hua	16	20	.444	6th	Did not qualify	Did not participate					
2025–26	TPBL	Momir Ratković	20	16	.556	4th	Lost play-in (Kings) 1–2	Did not participate					
2026–27	TPBL	Mathias Fischer	3	2	.600			Did not participate					
Totals			100	65	.606	–	4 Playoff appearances	–	0	0	–	–	0 Playoff appearances

== Notable players ==
Local players

- (Taiwan) Mohammad Al Bachir Gadiaga (阿巴西) – Chinese Taipei national team player, T1 League MVP (2023, 2024)
- (Taiwan) Hsieh Ya-Hsuan (謝亞軒) – Chinese Taipei national team player
- (Taiwan) Huang Hung-Han (黃泓瀚) – Chinese Taipei national team player
- (Taiwan) Lee Hsueh-Lin (李學林) – Chinese Taipei national team player, CBA Finals MVP (2012)
- (Taiwan) Lin Jen-Hung (林任鴻) – Chinese Taipei national team player
- (Taiwan) Lin Ping-Sheng (林秉聖) – Chinese Taipei national team player
- (Taiwan) Lin Wei-Han (林韋翰) – Chinese Taipei national team player, T1 League Finals MVP (2023)
- (Taiwan) (United Kingdom) Jonah Morrison (譚傑龍) – Chinese Taipei national team player
- (Taiwan) Tseng Wen-Ting (曾文鼎) – Chinese Taipei national team player, SBL Finals MVP (2005, 2006), SBL MVP (2010)
- (Taiwan) Wei Chia-Hao (魏嘉豪) – Chinese Taipei national team player

Type-III players

- Chanatip Jakrawan – Thailand national team player
- (Philippines) (United States) Avery Scharer – TBL Finals MVP (2018)

Import players

- (United States Virgin Islands) (Puerto Rico) Ivan Aska – Virgin Islands national team player, FIBA CBC Championship MVP (2015)
- Kaspars Bērziņš – Latvia national team player
- Vladimír Brodziansky – Slovakia national team player
- (United States) Nysier Brooks – LBL Finals MVP (2023)
- Cody Demps – United States national team player
- (United States) Cleanthony Early – NBA player
- (United States) (Georgia (country)) Conner Frankamp – Georgia national team player
- Viktor Gaddefors – Sweden national team player, SBL MVP (2021)
- (United States) Prince Ibeh – Rwanda national team player
- Pavlin Ivanov – Bulgaria national team player, NBL Finals MVP (2016), Bulgarian Basketball Cup MVP (2022)
- Nemanja Nenadić – Serbia national team player
- Nemanja Radović – Montenegro national team player
- Marko Todorović – Montenegro national team player, Segunda FEB MVP (2012)
- Edgaras Želionis – Lithuania national team player
