= Taiwan Professional Basketball League =

Taiwanese professional basketball league

- Current season, competition or edition: 2026–27 TPBL season
- Sport: Basketball
- Founded: July 9, 2024
- First season: 2024–25
- Commissioner: Chuang Jui-Hsiung
- Motto: For Real
- No. of teams: 7
- Country: Taiwan
- Most recent champions: Formosa Dreamers (1st title)
- Most titles: New Taipei Kings; Formosa Dreamers (1 each)
- Broadcasters: VL Sports; MOMOTV; Sportcast
- Sponsor: Shopee
- Website: tpbl.basketball

The Taiwan Professional Basketball League (TPBL, Chinese: 台灣職業籃球大聯盟) is a professional basketball league in Taiwan composed of seven teams. It is the fourth Taiwanese professional basketball league after the Chinese Basketball Alliance (CBA; 1994–1999), P. League+ (PLG; founded in 2020), and T1 League (2021–2024).

== History ==
=== 2024 ===
On June 22, 2024, Walter Wang, the chairman of the New Taipei Kings, announced that the new league would be established. Four teams of the P. League+ (the Formosa Dreamers, Hsinchu Toplus Lioneers, Kaohsiung 17LIVE Steelers, and the New Taipei Kings) and five teams of the T1 League (the Kaohsiung Aquas, New Taipei CTBC DEA, Tainan TSG GhostHawks, Taipei Mars, and the Taiwan Beer Leopards) submitted a letter of intent to join the new league. There was a Southeast Asia basketball team would join the league. (Note: The news reported that the Southeast Asia basketball team would be Singapore national team.) On June 24, the new league preparation committee announced that the new season would start on November. On June 26, the P. League+ announced that two leagues aimed to merge for the 2024–25 season. T1 League announced that the five teams of the T1 League would organize the new league for the 2024–25 season. The new league preparation committee announced that the eleven teams of the two leagues would organize the new league. On July 1, Chang Shu-Jen, the general manager of the Hsinchu Toplus Lioneers, was temporarily named as the spokesman of the new league. The new league preparation committee announced that P. League+ and T1 League would jointly hold the united draft on July 15. On July 8, Chuang Jui-Hsiung was named as the commissioner of the new league. The Taipei Fubon Braves, Taoyuan Pauian Pilots, and the Kaohsiung 17LIVE Steelers announced to quit the new league in preparation for the new season of the P. League+. On July 9, the Tainan TSG GhostHawks announced to quit the new league preparation for the new season of the P. League+. The Taipei Taishin Mars, New Taipei Kings, New Taipei CTBC DEA, Taoyuan Taiwan Beer Leopards, Hsinchu Toplus Lioneers, Formosa Dreamers, and the Kaohsiung Aquas announced to join the Taiwan Professional Basketball League. On July 23, the TPBL held the first draft. 33 players participated in the draft, and 11 players were chosen in three rounds. On August 1, the TPBL announced that Wang Chih-Chun and Yang He-Ping, former secretary general of the T1 League and former chief operating officer of the P. League+, were the deputy secretaries of the league. On August 21, the TPBL announced that the new season would play as seven teams. On September 19, the TPBL announced that Larry Chi was the secretary general of the league. On October 19, the 2024–25 season opening game, matched by the New Taipei CTBC DEA and the Formosa Dreamers, was played at Taichung Intercontinental Basketball Stadium.

=== 2025 ===
On February 19, 2025, the TPBL announced a three-year partnership with the WSC Sports. On March 21, the KC Global Media Asia announced a five-year English broadcasting partnership with the TPBL. On March 26, the TPBL announced a sponsorship with the Google Pixel. On April 10, the TPBL announced a partnership with the ALUXE. On June 29, the New Taipei Kings defeated the Kaohsiung Aquas, 4–3, winning the 2024–25 season championship. On July 16, the TPBL and P. League+ announced the cooperation for 7+3 teams playing in the 2025–26 season. On July 25, the TPBL cancelled the cooperation with P. League+, and the TPBL only discussed with P. League+ for league merging. On July 31, the TPBL stopped the discussion with P. League+ for league merging, and started to prepare for the 2025–26 season. On August 11, the TPBL held the second draft. 27 players participated in the draft, and eight players were chosen in two rounds. On August 27, the TPBL announced that Larry Chi had resigned as secretary general, and named Wang Chih-Chun and Cheng Po-Jen, the deputy secretary and commissioner secretary of the league, as their interim secretary general and new deputy secretary. On October 11, the 2025–26 season opening game, matched by the Kaohsiung Aquas and the New Taipei Kings, was played at Xinzhuang Gymnasium.

=== 2026 ===
On March 3, 2026, the TPBL announced a partnership with the INMORIES. On June 6, the Formosa Dreamers defeated the New Taipei Kings, 4–3, winning the 2025–26 season championship. On July 1, the TPBL announced that Yang He-Ping had resigned as deputy secretary. On July 16, the TPBL held the third draft. 28 players participated in the draft, and eight players were chosen in two rounds. On October 7, the TPBL announced a sponsorship with the Shopee. On October 17, the 2026–27 season opening game, matched by the New Taipei Kings and the Formosa Dreamers, was played at Taichung Intercontinental Basketball Stadium.

== Teams ==
Team	Chinese name	Location	Arena (2026–27 season)	Founded	Joined	Map
Formosa Dreamers	福爾摩沙夢想家	Taichung City	Taichung Intercontinental Basketball Stadium	2017	2024	Taiwan Professional Basketball League is located in Taiwan
Hsinchu Toplus Lioneers	新竹御嵿攻城獅	Hsinchu County	Hsinchu County Stadium	2020	2024	Taiwan Professional Basketball League is located in Taiwan
Kaohsiung Aquas	高雄全家海神	Kaohsiung City	Kaohsiung Arena	2021	2024	Taiwan Professional Basketball League is located in Taiwan
New Taipei CTBC DEA	新北中信特攻	New Taipei City	Xinzhuang Gymnasium	2021	2024	Taiwan Professional Basketball League is located in Taiwan
New Taipei Kings	新北國王	New Taipei City	Xinzhuang Gymnasium	2021	2024	Taiwan Professional Basketball League is located in Taiwan
Taipei Taishin Mars	臺北台新戰神	Taipei City	Taipei Heping Basketball Gymnasium	2023	2024	Taiwan Professional Basketball League is located in Taiwan
Taoyuan Taiwan Beer Leopards	桃園台啤永豐雲豹	Taoyuan City	Taoyuan Arena	2021	2024	Taiwan Professional Basketball League is located in Taiwan

== Rules and regulations ==
=== Games ===
Each quarter plays 12 minutes. Each game plays 48 minutes in total.

=== Players ===
- Each team can register nine to 17 local players and three to four import players.
- Each team is able to register one naturalised player as a local player when the naturalised player stayed in the same team for three years after finishing naturalisation.
- Each team is able to select eight to 14 players to the active roster in each match.
- Each team is able to select two to three import players into the active roster in each match.
- 8-imports-in-4-quarters rule: each quarter can have two import players on the court.
- Player loan system is allowed between the teams in TPBL and different league.

== Regular season ==
Each team plays against another six times, three at home and three on the road. Each team plays 36 matches total in the regular season.

=== Ranking ===
Seasons	1st place	2nd place	3rd place	4th place	5th place	6th place	7th place	MVP	Ref.
2024–25	New Taipei Kings; 26–10	Formosa Dreamers; 21–15	Kaohsiung Aquas; 19–17	Taipei Taishin Mars; 16–20	Taoyuan Taiwan Beer Leopards; 16–20	New Taipei CTBC DEA; 16–20	Hsinchu Toplus Lioneers; 12–24	Jeremy Lin (Kings)	
2025–26	Taoyuan Taiwan Beer Leopards; 23–13	Formosa Dreamers; 22–14	Hsinchu Toplus Lioneers; 22–14	New Taipei CTBC DEA; 20–16	New Taipei Kings; 19–17	Taipei Taishin Mars; 11–25	Kaohsiung Aquas; 9–27	Gao Jin-Wei (Leopards)	
2026–27	–	–	–	–	–	–	–	()	

== Playoffs ==
=== Play-in ===
The fourth and fifth seeds play the best-of-three play-in series. The fourth seed is awarded a one-win advantage. The winner qualifies to the semifinals series.

Years	Qualifiers	Result	Eliminated	Ref.
2025	Taipei Taishin Mars	2–1	Taoyuan Taiwan Beer Leopards	
2026	New Taipei Kings	2–1	New Taipei CTBC DEA	

=== Semifinals ===
The winner of the play-in series and the top three seeds play the best-of-seven semifinals series. The semifinals series changed to a best-of-five series in 2026.

Years	Qualifiers	Result	Eliminated	Ref.
2025	New Taipei Kings	4–0	Taipei Taishin Mars	
2025	Kaohsiung Aquas	4–1	Formosa Dreamers	
2026	Formosa Dreamers	3–1	Hsinchu Toplus Lioneers	
2026	New Taipei Kings	3–1	Taoyuan Taiwan Beer Leopards	

=== Finals ===
The winners of the semifinals series play the best-of-seven finals series.

Years	Champions	Result	Runners-up	FMVP	Ref.
2025	New Taipei Kings (1)	4–3	Kaohsiung Aquas	Jeremy Lin (Kings)	
2026	Formosa Dreamers (1)	4–3	New Taipei Kings	Ben Bentil (Dreamers)	

== Broadcast partners ==
Seasons	Television	Online	Ref.
2024–25	VL Sports, MOMOTV, DAZN, Sportcast	YouTube	
2025–26	VL Sports, MOMOTV, Sportcast	YouTube	
2026–27	VL Sports, MOMOTV, Sportcast	YouTube, VL Sports APP, DAZN	

== Mottos ==
Seasons	Mottos	Ref.
2024–25	All Eyes On Us	
2025–26	Nothing But Love	
2026–27	For Real	

== See also ==
- Basketball Champions League Asia (BCL Asia)
- Chinese Basketball Alliance (CBA)
- Chinese Taipei men's national basketball team
- East Asia Super League (EASL)
- List of basketball leagues
- P. League+ (PLG)
- Sport in Taiwan
- Super Basketball League (SBL)
- T1 League
- Women's Super Basketball League (WSBL)
