= 2026–27 TPBL regular season =

2nd TPBL regular season

Taiwan Professional Basketball League
- Season: 2026–27
- Duration: October 17, 2026 – May 16, 2027
- Games played: 36 per team
- Teams: 7

Records
- Biggest home win: Dreamers 90–103 Mars (November 7, 2026)
- Biggest away win: DEA 128–100 Aquas (November 1, 2026)
- Highest scoring: Aquas 132–129 Lioneers (October 25, 2026); Mars 121–132 Aquas (October 31, 2026)
- Lowest scoring: Kings 89–81 DEA (October 25, 2026); Leopards 89–81 Kings (October 31, 2026)
- Winning streak: 2 games Kings; Aquas (2 times); Mars; DEA
- Losing streak: 3 games Dreamers
- All statistics correct as of November 22, 2026.

The 2026–27 TPBL regular season is the third regular season of Taiwan Professional Basketball League. Participating teams included the Formosa Dreamers, Hsinchu Toplus Lioneers, Kaohsiung Aquas, New Taipei CTBC DEA, New Taipei Kings, Taipei Taishin Mars, and the Taoyuan Taiwan Beer Leopards. Each team played against another six times, three at home and three on the road, respectively, led to 36 matches in total. The regular season started on October 17, 2026 and is scheduled to end on May 16, 2027. The 2026–27 season opening game, matched by the New Taipei Kings and the Formosa Dreamers, was played at Taichung Intercontinental Basketball Stadium.

== League table ==
Pos	Team	Pld	W	L	PCT	GB	Qualification
1	Kaohsiung Aquas	6	4	2	.667	—	Advance to semifinals
2	New Taipei Kings	5	3	2	.600	0.5	Advance to semifinals
3	New Taipei CTBC DEA	5	3	2	.600	0.5	Advance to semifinals
4	Taipei Taishin Mars	4	2	2	.500	1	Advance to play-in
5	Taoyuan Taiwan Beer Leopards	4	2	2	.500	1	Advance to play-in
6	Hsinchu Toplus Lioneers	3	1	2	.333	1.5	
7	Formosa Dreamers	5	1	4	.200	2.5	

Source: TPBL

=== Head to head ===
Home \ Away	MARS	DEA	KINGS	LEOPARDS	LIONEERS	DREAMERS	AQUAS
Taipei Taishin Mars	—	0–0	0–0	1–0	0–0	1–0	0–0
New Taipei CTBC DEA	1–0	—	0–1	0–0	0–0	0–0	0–1
New Taipei Kings	0–0	0–0	—	0–1	0–1	0–0	0–0
Taoyuan Taiwan Beer Leopards	0–0	0–0	0–1	—	1–0	0–0	0–0
Hsinchu Toplus Lioneers	0–0	0–0	0–0	0–0	—	0–0	0–1
Formosa Dreamers	0–0	0–1	0–1	0–0	0–0	—	1–1
Kaohsiung Aquas	1–0	0–1	0–0	0–0	0–0	0–0	—

Source: TPBL
Legend: Blue = home team win; Red = away team win.
Matches with lighter background shading were decided after overtime.

== Matches ==
=== Matchweek 1 (opening match) ===
October 17, 2026 Regular #001	New Taipei Kings	113–106(OT)	Formosa Dreamers	Taichung City
17:00 (UTC+8)	Scoring by quarter: 22–25, 25–30, 30–25, 22–19, Overtime: 14–7
	Pts: Lewis 33; Rebs: Lewis 13; Asts: Sword, J. Lin 5	boxscore	Pts: Kidd 22; Rebs: Gilbeck, Kidd 10; Asts: Kidd, Chen Jen-Jei 3	Arena: Taichung Intercontinental Basketball Stadium; Attendance: 3,000; Referees: Chen Hung-Ming, Lo Kuo-Hsien, Lin Yuan-Dian

October 18, 2026 Regular #002	Kaohsiung Aquas	114–115	Formosa Dreamers	Taichung City
17:00 (UTC+8)	Scoring by quarter: 37–23, 26–26, 27–30, 24–36
	Pts: Basile 36; Rebs: Basile 14; Asts: Chen Huai-An 8	boxscore	Pts: Gilbeck, Lin Chun-Chi 23; Rebs: Gilbeck 15; Asts: Chiang Yu-An 4	Arena: Taichung Intercontinental Basketball Stadium; Attendance: 2,889; Referees: Ho Chang-Jen, Hou Chun-Jen, Chen Chien-Lin

=== Matchweek 2 ===
Postponed (Note: The match, originally scheduled for October 24, 2026, was postponed to March 17, 2027 due to the Typhoon Champi.) Regular #003	Formosa Dreamers	vs.	Hsinchu Toplus Lioneers	Hsinchu County
14:30 (UTC+8)	Scoring by quarter: –, –, –, –
		boxscore		Arena: Hsinchu County Stadium

Postponed (Note: The match, originally scheduled for October 24, 2026, was postponed due to the Typhoon Champi.) Regular #004	Taipei Taishin Mars	vs.	New Taipei CTBC DEA	New Taipei City
17:00 (UTC+8)	Scoring by quarter: –, –, –, –
		boxscore		Arena: Xinzhuang Gymnasium

October 25, 2026 Regular #005	Kaohsiung Aquas	132–129(2OT)	Hsinchu Toplus Lioneers	Hsinchu County
14:30 (UTC+8)	Scoring by quarter: 34–34, 22–24, 29–28, 25–24, Overtime: 22–19
	Pts: Allen 42; Rebs: Allen 22; Asts: Su Wen-Ju 7	boxscore	Pts: Diallo 41; Rebs: Diallo 19; Asts: Tseng Po-Yu 9	Arena: Hsinchu County Stadium; Attendance: 5,463; Referees: Lo Kuo-Hsien, Lai Chien-Hao, Wang Chang Shih-Yuan

October 25, 2026 Regular #006	New Taipei Kings	89–81	New Taipei CTBC DEA	New Taipei City
17:00 (UTC+8)	Scoring by quarter: 17–28, 25–20, 25–14, 22–19
	Pts: J. Lin 18; Rebs: Lewis 12; Asts: J. Lin 6	boxscore	Pts: Brodziansky 19; Rebs: Brodziansky 15; Asts: Wei Chia-Hao 6	Arena: Xinzhuang Gymnasium; Attendance: 4,146; Referees: Lin Chien-Hung, Peng Shih-Hsuan, Ou Yang Yu-Hsien

=== Matchweek 3 ===
October 31, 2026 Regular #007	Taoyuan Taiwan Beer Leopards	89–81	New Taipei Kings	New Taipei City
14:30 (UTC+8)	Scoring by quarter: 27–21, 30–13, 21–31, 11–16
	Pts: Miller 22; Rebs: Motum 11; Asts: Gao Jin-Wei 5	boxscore	Pts: Sword 25; Rebs: three players 9 Asts: Sword 5	Arena: Xinzhuang Gymnasium; Attendance: 4,202; Referees: Huang Chen-Feng, Lai Chien-Hao, Chen Ching-Hsiang

October 31, 2026 Regular #008	Taipei Taishin Mars	121–132	Kaohsiung Aquas	Kaohsiung City
17:00 (UTC+8)	Scoring by quarter: 31–44, 28–29, 33–19, 29–40
	Pts: Lin Ting-Chien 26; Rebs: Marić 10; Asts: Lin Ting-Chien 7	boxscore	Pts: Basile 37; Rebs: Basile 13; Asts: Allen 11	Arena: Kaohsiung Arena; Attendance: 10,824; Referees: Chen Hung-Ming, Sung Ming-Lu, Hsu Wei-Kai

November 1, 2026 Regular #009	Hsinchu Toplus Lioneers	95–93	New Taipei Kings	New Taipei City
14:30 (UTC+8)	Scoring by quarter: 29–29, 17–24, 26–15, 23–25
	Pts: Pember 18; Rebs: Diallo 12; Asts: Pember 6	boxscore	Pts: Lin Yan-Ting 21; Rebs: Washburn, Lewis 8 Asts: Lee Kai-Yan 6	Arena: Xinzhuang Gymnasium; Attendance: 4,109; Referees: Chen Chao-Hung, Lin Tsung-Yun, Chang Chia-Neng

November 1, 2026 Regular #010	New Taipei CTBC DEA	128–100	Kaohsiung Aquas	Kaohsiung City
17:00 (UTC+8)	Scoring by quarter: 35–22, 34–25, 36–25, 23–28
	Pts: Bachir 29; Rebs: Brodziansky 9 Asts: Brodziansky 5	boxscore	Pts: Hinton, Allen 14; Rebs: Allen 8 Asts: three players 4	Arena: Kaohsiung Arena; Attendance: 5,875; Referees: Ho Chang-Jen, Tsai Tsung-Ting, Wu Fang-Shan

=== Matchweek 4 ===
November 7, 2026 Regular #011	Formosa Dreamers	90–103	Taipei Taishin Mars	Taipei City
14:30 (UTC+8)	Scoring by quarter: 25–26, 20–30, 17–22, 28–25
	Pts: Lin Chun-Chi 24; Rebs: Gilbeck 14; Asts: Lin Chun-Chi 5	boxscore	Pts: Marić 31; Rebs: Marić 15; Asts: Lin Ting-Chien 8	Arena: Taipei Heping Basketball Gymnasium; Attendance: 5,486; Referees: Ho Chang-Jen, Lai Chien-Hao, Peng Shih-Hsuan

November 8, 2026 Regular #012	Taoyuan Taiwan Beer Leopards	91–102	Taipei Taishin Mars	Taipei City
14:30 (UTC+8)	Scoring by quarter: 32–27, 18–22, 26–19, 15–34
	Pts: Motum 21; Rebs: Miller 9 Asts: Gao Jin-Wei, Tsao Xun-Xiang 4	boxscore	Pts: Lin Ting-Chien 29; Rebs: Marić 16; Asts: Ting Sheng-Ju 4	Arena: Taipei Heping Basketball Gymnasium; Attendance: 4,826; Referees: Chen Chao-Hung, Yang Shih-Hsien, Chen Chien-Lin

=== Matchweek 5 ===
November 14, 2026 Regular #013	Hsinchu Toplus Lioneers	95–100(OT)	Taoyuan Taiwan Beer Leopards	Taoyuan City
14:30 (UTC+8)	Scoring by quarter: 34–20, 20–23, 18–23, 15–21, Overtime: 8–13
	Pts: Lu Kuan-Hsuan 23; Rebs: Pember 20; Asts: Pember 6	boxscore	Pts: Wimbush 26; Rebs: Wimbush 12; Asts: Gao Jin-Wei 6	Arena: Taoyuan Arena; Attendance: 4,933; Referees: Chen Hung-Ming, Hsieh Shang-Chien, Ou Yang Yu-Hsien

November 14, 2026 Regular #014	Kaohsiung Aquas	106–104	New Taipei CTBC DEA	New Taipei City
17:00 (UTC+8)	Scoring by quarter: 28–25, 28–24, 27–32, 23–23
	Pts: Allen 25; Rebs: Allen 10; Asts: Maldonado 10	boxscore	Pts: Brodziansky 28; Rebs: Brodziansky 16; Asts: Wei Chia-Hao 11	Arena: Xinzhuang Gymnasium; Attendance: 4,282; Referees: Chuang Chih-Chun, Huang Chen-Feng, Lin Tsung-Yun

November 15, 2026 Regular #015	New Taipei Kings	110–93	Taoyuan Taiwan Beer Leopards	Taoyuan City
14:30 (UTC+8)	Scoring by quarter: 28–14, 30–25, 28–24, 24–30
	Pts: J. Lin 27; Rebs: Sword 10; Asts: Sword 10	boxscore	Pts: Wimbush 23; Rebs: Motum 10; Asts: four players 3	Arena: Taoyuan Arena; Attendance: 5,233; Referees: Ho Chang-Jen, Tsai Tsung-Ting, Yu Fu-Jung

November 15, 2026 Regular #016	Taipei Taishin Mars	87–94	New Taipei CTBC DEA	New Taipei City
17:00 (UTC+8)	Scoring by quarter: 25–17, 23–22, 24–33, 15–22
	Pts: Manu 17; Rebs: Marić 15; Asts: McGee, Ting Sheng-Ju 4	boxscore	Pts: Bachir 26; Rebs: Brodziansky 8 Asts: Nenadić, Tseng Wen-Ting 6	Arena: Xinzhuang Gymnasium; Attendance: 4,135; Referees: Lo Kuo-Hsien, Hou Chun-Jen, Wang Chang Shih-Yuan

=== Matchweek 6 ===
November 21, 2026 Regular #017	Kaohsiung Aquas	107–90	Formosa Dreamers	Taichung City
14:30 (UTC+8)	Scoring by quarter: 24–20, 29–21, 32–33, 22–16
	Pts: Galvanini 27; Rebs: Galvanini 16; Asts: Yu Huan-Ya 9	boxscore	Pts: Chiang Yu-An 26; Rebs: Gilbeck 12; Asts: Chiang Yu-An 6	Arena: Taichung Intercontinental Basketball Stadium; Attendance: 2,197; Referees: Lin Chien-Hung, Lai Chien-Hao, Chen Hsin

November 22, 2026 Regular #018	New Taipei CTBC DEA	115–98	Formosa Dreamers	Taichung City
14:30 (UTC+8)	Scoring by quarter: 37–30, 32–16, 21–27, 25–25
	Pts: Jones 26; Rebs: Jones 12; Asts: Bachir, Lin Wei-Han 7	boxscore	Pts: Gilbeck 18; Rebs: Holman 11; Asts: Lin Chun-Chi 6	Arena: Taichung Intercontinental Basketball Stadium; Attendance: 2,104; Referees: Lin Yuan-Dian, Hsieh Shang-Chien, Chen Ching-Hsiang

=== Matchweek 7 ===
November 25, 2026 Regular #019	Hsinchu Toplus Lioneers	vs.	Formosa Dreamers	Taichung City
19:00 (UTC+8)	Scoring by quarter: –, –, –, –
		boxscore		Arena: Taichung Intercontinental Basketball Stadium

November 27, 2026 Regular #020	Taoyuan Taiwan Beer Leopards	vs.	Formosa Dreamers	Taichung City
19:00 (UTC+8)	Scoring by quarter: –, –, –, –
		boxscore		Arena: Taichung Intercontinental Basketball Stadium

=== Matchweek 8 ===
December 2, 2026 Regular #021	Taipei Taishin Mars	vs.	New Taipei Kings	New Taipei City
19:00 (UTC+8)	Scoring by quarter: –, –, –, –
		boxscore		Arena: Xinzhuang Gymnasium

December 4, 2026 Regular #022	New Taipei CTBC DEA	vs.	New Taipei Kings	New Taipei City
19:00 (UTC+8)	Scoring by quarter: –, –, –, –
		boxscore		Arena: Xinzhuang Gymnasium

December 5, 2026 Regular #023	Taoyuan Taiwan Beer Leopards	vs.	Kaohsiung Aquas	Kaohsiung City
14:30 (UTC+8)	Scoring by quarter: –, –, –, –
		boxscore		Arena: Kaohsiung Arena

December 5, 2026 Regular #024	Taipei Taishin Mars	vs.	Hsinchu Toplus Lioneers	Hsinchu County
17:00 (UTC+8)	Scoring by quarter: –, –, –, –
		boxscore		Arena: Hsinchu County Stadium

December 6, 2026 Regular #025	Formosa Dreamers	vs.	Kaohsiung Aquas	Kaohsiung City
14:30 (UTC+8)	Scoring by quarter: –, –, –, –
		boxscore		Arena: Kaohsiung Arena

December 6, 2026 Regular #026	New Taipei CTBC DEA	vs.	Hsinchu Toplus Lioneers	Hsinchu County
17:00 (UTC+8)	Scoring by quarter: –, –, –, –
		boxscore		Arena: Hsinchu County Stadium

=== Matchweek 9 ===
December 12, 2026 Regular #027	Taoyuan Taiwan Beer Leopards	vs.	New Taipei CTBC DEA	New Taipei City
14:30 (UTC+8)	Scoring by quarter: –, –, –, –
		boxscore		Arena: Xinzhuang Gymnasium

December 12, 2026 Regular #028	New Taipei Kings	vs.	Formosa Dreamers	Taichung City
17:00 (UTC+8)	Scoring by quarter: –, –, –, –
		boxscore		Arena: Taichung Intercontinental Basketball Stadium

December 13, 2026 Regular #029	Kaohsiung Aquas	vs.	New Taipei CTBC DEA	New Taipei City
14:30 (UTC+8)	Scoring by quarter: –, –, –, –
		boxscore		Arena: Xinzhuang Gymnasium

December 13, 2026 Regular #030	Taipei Taishin Mars	vs.	Formosa Dreamers	Taichung City
17:00 (UTC+8)	Scoring by quarter: –, –, –, –
		boxscore		Arena: Taichung Intercontinental Basketball Stadium

=== Matchweek 10 ===
December 19, 2026 Regular #031	Kaohsiung Aquas	vs.	New Taipei Kings	New Taipei City
14:30 (UTC+8)	Scoring by quarter: –, –, –, –
		boxscore		Arena: Xinzhuang Gymnasium

December 19, 2026 Regular #032	Formosa Dreamers	vs.	Taoyuan Taiwan Beer Leopards	Taoyuan City
17:00 (UTC+8)	Scoring by quarter: –, –, –, –
		boxscore		Arena: Taoyuan Arena

December 20, 2026 Regular #033	Hsinchu Toplus Lioneers	vs.	New Taipei Kings	New Taipei City
14:30 (UTC+8)	Scoring by quarter: –, –, –, –
		boxscore		Arena: Xinzhuang Gymnasium

December 20, 2026 Regular #034	Taipei Taishin Mars	vs.	Taoyuan Taiwan Beer Leopards	Taoyuan City
17:00 (UTC+8)	Scoring by quarter: –, –, –, –
		boxscore		Arena: Taoyuan Arena

=== Matchweek 11 ===
December 23, 2026 Regular #035	New Taipei Kings	vs.	Taoyuan Taiwan Beer Leopards	Taoyuan City
19:00 (UTC+8)	Scoring by quarter: –, –, –, –
		boxscore		Arena: Taoyuan Arena

December 25, 2026 Regular #036	New Taipei CTBC DEA	vs.	Taoyuan Taiwan Beer Leopards	Taoyuan City
19:00 (UTC+8)	Scoring by quarter: –, –, –, –
		boxscore		Arena: Taoyuan Arena

December 26, 2026 Regular #037	Hsinchu Toplus Lioneers	vs.	Kaohsiung Aquas	Kaohsiung City
14:30 (UTC+8)	Scoring by quarter: –, –, –, –
		boxscore		Arena: Kaohsiung Arena

December 26, 2026 Regular #038	New Taipei Kings	vs.	Taipei Taishin Mars	Taipei City
17:00 (UTC+8)	Scoring by quarter: –, –, –, –
		boxscore		Arena: Taipei Heping Basketball Gymnasium

December 27, 2026 Regular #039	Formosa Dreamers	vs.	Kaohsiung Aquas	Kaohsiung City
14:30 (UTC+8)	Scoring by quarter: –, –, –, –
		boxscore		Arena: Kaohsiung Arena

December 27, 2026 Regular #040	New Taipei CTBC DEA	vs.	Taipei Taishin Mars	Taipei City
17:00 (UTC+8)	Scoring by quarter: –, –, –, –
		boxscore		Arena: Taipei Heping Basketball Gymnasium

=== Matchweek 12 ===
December 30, 2026 Regular #041	Hsinchu Toplus Lioneers	vs.	Taipei Taishin Mars	Taipei City
19:00 (UTC+8)	Scoring by quarter: –, –, –, –
		boxscore		Arena: Taipei Heping Basketball Gymnasium

January 2, 2027 Regular #042	New Taipei Kings	vs.	Kaohsiung Aquas	Kaohsiung City
14:30 (UTC+8)	Scoring by quarter: –, –, –, –
		boxscore		Arena: Kaohsiung Arena

January 2, 2027 Regular #043	Formosa Dreamers	vs.	New Taipei CTBC DEA	New Taipei City
17:00 (UTC+8)	Scoring by quarter: –, –, –, –
		boxscore		Arena: Xinzhuang Gymnasium

January 3, 2027 Regular #044	Taipei Taishin Mars	vs.	Kaohsiung Aquas	Kaohsiung City
14:30 (UTC+8)	Scoring by quarter: –, –, –, –
		boxscore		Arena: Kaohsiung Arena

January 3, 2027 Regular #045	Hsinchu Toplus Lioneers	vs.	New Taipei CTBC DEA	New Taipei City
17:00 (UTC+8)	Scoring by quarter: –, –, –, –
		boxscore		Arena: Xinzhuang Gymnasium

=== Matchweek 13 ===
January 6, 2027 Regular #046	New Taipei Kings	vs.	Hsinchu Toplus Lioneers	Hsinchu County
19:00 (UTC+8)	Scoring by quarter: –, –, –, –
		boxscore		Arena: Hsinchu County Stadium

January 9, 2027 Regular #047	New Taipei CTBC DEA	vs.	Formosa Dreamers	Taichung City
14:30 (UTC+8)	Scoring by quarter: –, –, –, –
		boxscore		Arena: Taichung Intercontinental Basketball Stadium

January 9, 2027 Regular #048	Kaohsiung Aquas	vs.	Hsinchu Toplus Lioneers	Hsinchu County
17:00 (UTC+8)	Scoring by quarter: –, –, –, –
		boxscore		Arena: Hsinchu County Stadium

January 10, 2027 Regular #049	Taipei Taishin Mars	vs.	Formosa Dreamers	Taichung City
14:30 (UTC+8)	Scoring by quarter: –, –, –, –
		boxscore		Arena: Taichung Intercontinental Basketball Stadium

January 10, 2027 Regular #050	Taoyuan Taiwan Beer Leopards	vs.	Hsinchu Toplus Lioneers	Hsinchu County
17:00 (UTC+8)	Scoring by quarter: –, –, –, –
		boxscore		Arena: Hsinchu County Stadium

=== Matchweek 14 ===
January 16, 2027 Regular #051	Hsinchu Toplus Lioneers	vs.	Formosa Dreamers	Taichung City
14:30 (UTC+8)	Scoring by quarter: –, –, –, –
		boxscore		Arena: Taichung Intercontinental Basketball Stadium

January 16, 2027 Regular #052	New Taipei Kings	vs.	Taipei Taishin Mars	Taipei City
17:00 (UTC+8)	Scoring by quarter: –, –, –, –
		boxscore		Arena: Taipei Heping Basketball Gymnasium

January 17, 2027 Regular #053	Taoyuan Taiwan Beer Leopards	vs.	Formosa Dreamers	Taichung City
14:30 (UTC+8)	Scoring by quarter: –, –, –, –
		boxscore		Arena: Taichung Intercontinental Basketball Stadium

January 17, 2027 Regular #054	Kaohsiung Aquas	vs.	Taipei Taishin Mars	Taipei City
17:00 (UTC+8)	Scoring by quarter: –, –, –, –
		boxscore		Arena: Taipei Heping Basketball Gymnasium

=== Matchweek 15 ===
January 23, 2027 Regular #055	New Taipei CTBC DEA	vs.	Taoyuan Taiwan Beer Leopards	Taoyuan City
14:30 (UTC+8)	Scoring by quarter: –, –, –, –
		boxscore		Arena: Taoyuan Arena

January 23, 2027 Regular #056	Hsinchu Toplus Lioneers	vs.	Taipei Taishin Mars	Taipei City
17:00 (UTC+8)	Scoring by quarter: –, –, –, –
		boxscore		Arena: Taipei Heping Basketball Gymnasium

January 24, 2027 Regular #057	Kaohsiung Aquas	vs.	Taoyuan Taiwan Beer Leopards	Taoyuan City
14:30 (UTC+8)	Scoring by quarter: –, –, –, –
		boxscore		Arena: Taoyuan Arena

January 24, 2027 Regular #058	Formosa Dreamers	vs.	Taipei Taishin Mars	Taipei City
17:00 (UTC+8)	Scoring by quarter: –, –, –, –
		boxscore		Arena: Taipei Heping Basketball Gymnasium

=== Matchweek 16 ===
January 30, 2027 Regular #059	Formosa Dreamers	vs.	New Taipei Kings	New Taipei City
14:30 (UTC+8)	Scoring by quarter: –, –, –, –
		boxscore		Arena: Xinzhuang Gymnasium

January 30, 2027 Regular #060	Hsinchu Toplus Lioneers	vs.	Taoyuan Taiwan Beer Leopards	Taoyuan City
17:00 (UTC+8)	Scoring by quarter: –, –, –, –
		boxscore		Arena: Taoyuan Arena

January 31, 2027 Regular #061	New Taipei CTBC DEA	vs.	New Taipei Kings	New Taipei City
14:30 (UTC+8)	Scoring by quarter: –, –, –, –
		boxscore		Arena: Xinzhuang Gymnasium

January 31, 2027 Regular #062	Taipei Taishin Mars	vs.	Taoyuan Taiwan Beer Leopards	Taoyuan City
17:00 (UTC+8)	Scoring by quarter: –, –, –, –
		boxscore		Arena: Taoyuan Arena

=== Matchweek 17 ===
February 13, 2027 Regular #063	Formosa Dreamers	vs.	Taoyuan Taiwan Beer Leopards	Taoyuan City
14:30 (UTC+8)	Scoring by quarter: –, –, –, –
		boxscore		Arena: Taoyuan Arena

February 13, 2027 Regular #064	New Taipei CTBC DEA	vs.	Kaohsiung Aquas	Kaohsiung City
17:00 (UTC+8)	Scoring by quarter: –, –, –, –
		boxscore		Arena: Kaohsiung Arena

February 14, 2027 Regular #065	New Taipei Kings	vs.	Taoyuan Taiwan Beer Leopards	Taoyuan City
14:30 (UTC+8)	Scoring by quarter: –, –, –, –
		boxscore		Arena: Taoyuan Arena

February 14, 2027 Regular #066	Hsinchu Toplus Lioneers	vs.	Kaohsiung Aquas	Kaohsiung City
17:00 (UTC+8)	Scoring by quarter: –, –, –, –
		boxscore		Arena: Kaohsiung Arena

=== Matchweek 18 ===
February 17, 2027 Regular #067	Taoyuan Taiwan Beer Leopards	vs.	Kaohsiung Aquas	Kaohsiung City
19:00 (UTC+8)	Scoring by quarter: –, –, –, –
		boxscore		Arena: Kaohsiung Arena

February 19, 2027 Regular #068	Formosa Dreamers	vs.	Kaohsiung Aquas	Kaohsiung City
19:00 (UTC+8)	Scoring by quarter: –, –, –, –
		boxscore		Arena: Kaohsiung Arena

February 20, 2027 Regular #069	Taipei Taishin Mars	vs.	New Taipei Kings	New Taipei City
14:30 (UTC+8)	Scoring by quarter: –, –, –, –
		boxscore		Arena: Xinzhuang Gymnasium

February 20, 2027 Regular #070	New Taipei CTBC DEA	vs.	Hsinchu Toplus Lioneers	Hsinchu County
17:00 (UTC+8)	Scoring by quarter: –, –, –, –
		boxscore		Arena: Hsinchu County Stadium

February 21, 2027 Regular #071	Taoyuan Taiwan Beer Leopards	vs.	New Taipei Kings	New Taipei City
14:30 (UTC+8)	Scoring by quarter: –, –, –, –
		boxscore		Arena: Xinzhuang Gymnasium

February 21, 2027 Regular #072	Formosa Dreamers	vs.	Hsinchu Toplus Lioneers	Hsinchu County
17:00 (UTC+8)	Scoring by quarter: –, –, –, –
		boxscore		Arena: Hsinchu County Stadium

=== Matchweek 19 ===
February 27, 2027 Regular #073	Taoyuan Taiwan Beer Leopards	vs.	New Taipei CTBC DEA	New Taipei City
14:30 (UTC+8)	Scoring by quarter: –, –, –, –
		boxscore		Arena: Xinzhuang Gymnasium

February 27, 2027 Regular #074	Kaohsiung Aquas	vs.	Taipei Taishin Mars	Taipei City
17:00 (UTC+8)	Scoring by quarter: –, –, –, –
		boxscore		Arena: Taipei Heping Basketball Gymnasium

February 28, 2027 Regular #075	Formosa Dreamers	vs.	New Taipei CTBC DEA	New Taipei City
14:30 (UTC+8)	Scoring by quarter: –, –, –, –
		boxscore		Arena: Xinzhuang Gymnasium

February 28, 2027 Regular #076	New Taipei Kings	vs.	Taipei Taishin Mars	Taipei City
17:00 (UTC+8)	Scoring by quarter: –, –, –, –
		boxscore		Arena: Taipei Heping Basketball Gymnasium

=== Matchweek 20 ===
March 6, 2027 Regular #077	New Taipei CTBC DEA	vs.	Taipei Taishin Mars	Taipei City
14:30 (UTC+8)	Scoring by quarter: –, –, –, –
		boxscore		Arena: Taipei Heping Basketball Gymnasium

March 6, 2027 Regular #078	Formosa Dreamers	vs.	New Taipei Kings	TBD
17:00 (UTC+8)	Scoring by quarter: –, –, –, –
		boxscore		Arena: TBD

March 7, 2027 Regular #079	Hsinchu Toplus Lioneers	vs.	Taipei Taishin Mars	Taipei City
14:30 (UTC+8)	Scoring by quarter: –, –, –, –
		boxscore		Arena: Taipei Heping Basketball Gymnasium

March 7, 2027 Regular #080	Kaohsiung Aquas	vs.	New Taipei Kings	TBD
17:00 (UTC+8)	Scoring by quarter: –, –, –, –
		boxscore		Arena: TBD

=== Matchweek 21 ===
March 13, 2027 Regular #081	New Taipei CTBC DEA	vs.	Formosa Dreamers	Taichung City
14:30 (UTC+8)	Scoring by quarter: –, –, –, –
		boxscore		Arena: Taichung Intercontinental Basketball Stadium

March 13, 2027 Regular #082	Hsinchu Toplus Lioneers	vs.	New Taipei Kings	TBD
17:00 (UTC+8)	Scoring by quarter: –, –, –, –
		boxscore		Arena: TBD

March 14, 2027 Regular #083	Kaohsiung Aquas	vs.	Formosa Dreamers	Taichung City
14:30 (UTC+8)	Scoring by quarter: –, –, –, –
		boxscore		Arena: Taichung Intercontinental Basketball Stadium

March 14, 2027 Regular #084	Taoyuan Taiwan Beer Leopards	vs.	New Taipei Kings	TBD
17:00 (UTC+8)	Scoring by quarter: –, –, –, –
		boxscore		Arena: TBD

=== Matchweek 22 ===
March 17, 2027 Regular #003	Formosa Dreamers	vs.	Hsinchu Toplus Lioneers	Hsinchu County
19:00 (UTC+8)	Scoring by quarter: –, –, –, –
		boxscore		Arena: Hsinchu County Stadium

March 20, 2027 Regular #085	New Taipei Kings	vs.	New Taipei CTBC DEA	TBD
14:30 (UTC+8)	Scoring by quarter: –, –, –, –
		boxscore		Arena: TBD

March 20, 2027 Regular #086	Kaohsiung Aquas	vs.	Hsinchu Toplus Lioneers	Hsinchu County
17:00 (UTC+8)	Scoring by quarter: –, –, –, –
		boxscore		Arena: Hsinchu County Stadium

March 21, 2027 Regular #087	Taoyuan Taiwan Beer Leopards	vs.	New Taipei CTBC DEA	TBD
14:30 (UTC+8)	Scoring by quarter: –, –, –, –
		boxscore		Arena: TBD

March 21, 2027 Regular #088	Taipei Taishin Mars	vs.	Hsinchu Toplus Lioneers	Hsinchu County
17:00 (UTC+8)	Scoring by quarter: –, –, –, –
		boxscore		Arena: Hsinchu County Stadium

=== Matchweek 23 ===
March 26, 2027 Regular #089	Formosa Dreamers	vs.	New Taipei CTBC DEA	TBD
19:00 (UTC+8)	Scoring by quarter: –, –, –, –
		boxscore		Arena: TBD

March 27, 2027 Regular #090	Hsinchu Toplus Lioneers	vs.	Kaohsiung Aquas	Kaohsiung City
14:30 (UTC+8)	Scoring by quarter: –, –, –, –
		boxscore		Arena: Kaohsiung Arena

March 27, 2027 Regular #091	Taipei Taishin Mars	vs.	Taoyuan Taiwan Beer Leopards	Taoyuan City
17:00 (UTC+8)	Scoring by quarter: –, –, –, –
		boxscore		Arena: Taoyuan Arena

March 28, 2027 Regular #092	New Taipei Kings	vs.	Kaohsiung Aquas	Kaohsiung City
14:30 (UTC+8)	Scoring by quarter: –, –, –, –
		boxscore		Arena: Kaohsiung Arena

March 28, 2027 Regular #093	New Taipei CTBC DEA	vs.	Taoyuan Taiwan Beer Leopards	Taoyuan City
17:00 (UTC+8)	Scoring by quarter: –, –, –, –
		boxscore		Arena: Taoyuan Arena

=== Matchweek 24 ===
April 3, 2027 Regular #094	Kaohsiung Aquas	vs.	Taoyuan Taiwan Beer Leopards	Taoyuan City
14:30 (UTC+8)	Scoring by quarter: –, –, –, –
		boxscore		Arena: Taoyuan Arena

April 3, 2027 Regular #095	Hsinchu Toplus Lioneers	vs.	New Taipei CTBC DEA	TBD
17:00 (UTC+8)	Scoring by quarter: –, –, –, –
		boxscore		Arena: TBD

April 4, 2027 Regular #096	Formosa Dreamers	vs.	Taoyuan Taiwan Beer Leopards	Taoyuan City
14:30 (UTC+8)	Scoring by quarter: –, –, –, –
		boxscore		Arena: Taoyuan Arena

April 4, 2027 Regular #097	Taipei Taishin Mars	vs.	New Taipei CTBC DEA	TBD
17:00 (UTC+8)	Scoring by quarter: –, –, –, –
		boxscore		Arena: TBD

=== Matchweek 25 ===
April 9, 2027 Regular #098	Kaohsiung Aquas	vs.	New Taipei CTBC DEA	TBD
19:00 (UTC+8)	Scoring by quarter: –, –, –, –
		boxscore		Arena: TBD

April 10, 2027 Regular #099	Taoyuan Taiwan Beer Leopards	vs.	Hsinchu Toplus Lioneers	Hsinchu County
14:30 (UTC+8)	Scoring by quarter: –, –, –, –
		boxscore		Arena: Hsinchu County Stadium

April 10, 2027 Regular #100	Formosa Dreamers	vs.	Taipei Taishin Mars	Taipei City
17:00 (UTC+8)	Scoring by quarter: –, –, –, –
		boxscore		Arena: Taipei Heping Basketball Gymnasium

April 11, 2027 Regular #101	New Taipei Kings	vs.	Hsinchu Toplus Lioneers	Hsinchu County
14:30 (UTC+8)	Scoring by quarter: –, –, –, –
		boxscore		Arena: Hsinchu County Stadium

April 11, 2027 Regular #102	New Taipei CTBC DEA	vs.	Taipei Taishin Mars	Taipei City
17:00 (UTC+8)	Scoring by quarter: –, –, –, –
		boxscore		Arena: Taipei Heping Basketball Gymnasium

=== Matchweek 26 ===
April 14, 2027 Regular #103	Taoyuan Taiwan Beer Leopards	vs.	Taipei Taishin Mars	Taipei City
19:00 (UTC+8)	Scoring by quarter: –, –, –, –
		boxscore		Arena: Taipei Heping Basketball Gymnasium

April 17, 2027 Regular #104	New Taipei Kings	vs.	Formosa Dreamers	Taichung City
14:30 (UTC+8)	Scoring by quarter: –, –, –, –
		boxscore		Arena: Taichung Intercontinental Basketball Stadium

April 17, 2027 Regular #105	New Taipei CTBC DEA	vs.	Kaohsiung Aquas	Kaohsiung City
17:00 (UTC+8)	Scoring by quarter: –, –, –, –
		boxscore		Arena: Kaohsiung Arena

April 18, 2027 Regular #106	Hsinchu Toplus Lioneers	vs.	Formosa Dreamers	Taichung City
14:30 (UTC+8)	Scoring by quarter: –, –, –, –
		boxscore		Arena: Taichung Intercontinental Basketball Stadium

April 18, 2027 Regular #107	Taipei Taishin Mars	vs.	Kaohsiung Aquas	Kaohsiung City
17:00 (UTC+8)	Scoring by quarter: –, –, –, –
		boxscore		Arena: Kaohsiung Arena

=== Matchweek 27 ===
April 24, 2027 Regular #108	New Taipei Kings	vs.	Kaohsiung Aquas	Kaohsiung City
14:30 (UTC+8)	Scoring by quarter: –, –, –, –
		boxscore		Arena: Kaohsiung Arena

April 24, 2027 Regular #109	Taipei Taishin Mars	vs.	Hsinchu Toplus Lioneers	Hsinchu County
17:00 (UTC+8)	Scoring by quarter: –, –, –, –
		boxscore		Arena: Hsinchu County Stadium

April 25, 2027 Regular #110	Taoyuan Taiwan Beer Leopards	vs.	Kaohsiung Aquas	Kaohsiung City
14:30 (UTC+8)	Scoring by quarter: –, –, –, –
		boxscore		Arena: Kaohsiung Arena

April 25, 2027 Regular #111	New Taipei CTBC DEA	vs.	Hsinchu Toplus Lioneers	Hsinchu County
17:00 (UTC+8)	Scoring by quarter: –, –, –, –
		boxscore		Arena: Hsinchu County Stadium

=== Matchweek 28 ===
April 28, 2027 Regular #112	Taipei Taishin Mars	vs.	New Taipei Kings	New Taipei City
19:00 (UTC+8)	Scoring by quarter: –, –, –, –
		boxscore		Arena: Xinzhuang Gymnasium

May 1, 2027 Regular #113	New Taipei CTBC DEA	vs.	New Taipei Kings	New Taipei City
14:30 (UTC+8)	Scoring by quarter: –, –, –, –
		boxscore		Arena: Xinzhuang Gymnasium

May 1, 2027 Regular #114	Kaohsiung Aquas	vs.	Taoyuan Taiwan Beer Leopards	Taoyuan City
17:00 (UTC+8)	Scoring by quarter: –, –, –, –
		boxscore		Arena: Taoyuan Arena

May 2, 2027 Regular #115	Formosa Dreamers	vs.	New Taipei Kings	New Taipei City
14:30 (UTC+8)	Scoring by quarter: –, –, –, –
		boxscore		Arena: Xinzhuang Gymnasium

May 2, 2027 Regular #116	Hsinchu Toplus Lioneers	vs.	Taoyuan Taiwan Beer Leopards	Taoyuan City
17:00 (UTC+8)	Scoring by quarter: –, –, –, –
		boxscore		Arena: Taoyuan Arena

=== Matchweek 29 ===
May 5, 2027 Regular #117	Taoyuan Taiwan Beer Leopards	vs.	Hsinchu Toplus Lioneers	Hsinchu County
19:00 (UTC+8)	Scoring by quarter: –, –, –, –
		boxscore		Arena: Hsinchu County Stadium

May 7, 2027 Regular #118	Kaohsiung Aquas	vs.	New Taipei Kings	New Taipei City
19:00 (UTC+8)	Scoring by quarter: –, –, –, –
		boxscore		Arena: Xinzhuang Gymnasium

May 8, 2027 Regular #119	Formosa Dreamers	vs.	Hsinchu Toplus Lioneers	Hsinchu County
14:30 (UTC+8)	Scoring by quarter: –, –, –, –
		boxscore		Arena: Hsinchu County Stadium

May 8, 2027 Regular #120	Taoyuan Taiwan Beer Leopards	vs.	Taipei Taishin Mars	Taipei City
17:00 (UTC+8)	Scoring by quarter: –, –, –, –
		boxscore		Arena: Taipei Heping Basketball Gymnasium

May 9, 2027 Regular #121	New Taipei Kings	vs.	Hsinchu Toplus Lioneers	Hsinchu County
14:30 (UTC+8)	Scoring by quarter: –, –, –, –
		boxscore		Arena: Hsinchu County Stadium

May 9, 2027 Regular #122	Kaohsiung Aquas	vs.	Taipei Taishin Mars	Taipei City
17:00 (UTC+8)	Scoring by quarter: –, –, –, –
		boxscore		Arena: Taipei Heping Basketball Gymnasium

=== Matchweek 30 ===
May 15, 2027 Regular #123	Taipei Taishin Mars	vs.	Formosa Dreamers	Taichung City
14:30 (UTC+8)	Scoring by quarter: –, –, –, –
		boxscore		Arena: Taichung Intercontinental Basketball Stadium

May 15, 2027 Regular #124	New Taipei Kings	vs.	New Taipei CTBC DEA	New Taipei City
17:00 (UTC+8)	Scoring by quarter: –, –, –, –
		boxscore		Arena: Xinzhuang Gymnasium

May 16, 2027 Regular #125	Taoyuan Taiwan Beer Leopards	vs.	Formosa Dreamers	Taichung City
14:30 (UTC+8)	Scoring by quarter: –, –, –, –
		boxscore		Arena: Taichung Intercontinental Basketball Stadium

May 16, 2027 Regular #126	Hsinchu Toplus Lioneers	vs.	New Taipei CTBC DEA	New Taipei City
17:00 (UTC+8)	Scoring by quarter: –, –, –, –
		boxscore		Arena: Xinzhuang Gymnasium

== Awards ==
=== Yearly awards ===
2026–27 TPBL awards
Award		Recipient	Team	Ref.
Most Valuable Player				
Most Valuable Import				
Defensive Player of the Year				
Rookie of the Year				
Sixth Man of the Year				
Most Improved Player				
Most Popular Player of the Year				
Comeback Player of the Year				
Social Justice Award				
Coach of the Year				
General Manager of the Year				
Home-Court of the Year				
Cheerleading Team of the Year				
Most Popular Cheerleader of the Year				
Most Popular Mascot of the Year				
Plays of the Year	Clutch Play of the Year			
Plays of the Year	Dunk of the Year			
Plays of the Year	Assist of the Year			
Plays of the Year	Block of the Year			

- All-TPBL First Team:
  - ()
  - ()
  - ()
  - ()
  - ()
- All-TPBL Second Team:
  - ()
  - ()
  - ()
  - ()
  - ()

- All-Defensive First Team:
  - ()
  - ()
  - ()
  - ()
  - ()
- All-Defensive Second Team:
  - ()
  - ()
  - ()
  - ()
  - ()

=== Statistical awards ===
2026–27 TPBL statistical awards
Award	Recipient	Team	Statistic	Ref.
Points Leader				
Rebounds Leader				
Assists Leader				
Steals Leader				
Blocks Leader				
Three-Point Leader				

=== Player of the Week ===
Week	Local player		Import player		Ref.
Week	Recipient	Team	Recipient	Team	Ref.
1	Lin Chun-Chi	Formosa Dreamers	Brandon Gilbeck	Formosa Dreamers	
2	Joseph Lin	New Taipei Kings	Rosco Allen	Kaohsiung Aquas	
3	Mohammad Al Bachir Gadiaga	New Taipei CTBC DEA	Drew Pember	Hsinchu Toplus Lioneers	
4	Lin Ting-Chien	Taipei Taishin Mars	Marin Marić	Taipei Taishin Mars	
5	Joseph Lin	New Taipei Kings	Craig Sword	New Taipei Kings	

=== Player of the Month ===
Month	Local player		Import player		Ref.
Month	Recipient	Team	Recipient	Team	Ref.
2026
October & November					
December					
2027
January & February					
March					
April					
May					

== See also ==
- 2026–27 Formosa Dreamers season
- 2026–27 Hsinchu Toplus Lioneers season
- 2026–27 Kaohsiung Aquas season
- 2026–27 New Taipei CTBC DEA season
- 2026–27 New Taipei Kings season
- 2026–27 Taipei Taishin Mars season
- 2026–27 Taoyuan Taiwan Beer Leopards season
