= 2026–27 Kaohsiung Aquas season =

Taiwanese professional basketball season

- President: Hou Chia-Chi
- Head Coach: Zico Coronel
- Arena: Kaohsiung Arena

TPBL results
- Record: 4–2 (66.7%)
- Place: TBD
- Playoffs finish: TBD

The 2026–27 Kaohsiung Aquas season is the franchise's sixth season, its third season in the Taiwan Professional Basketball League (TPBL).

On June 9, 2026, the Aquas hired Zico Coronel as their new head coach.

== Draft ==
Round	Pick	Player	Position(s)	School / club team
1	1	Adam Hinton	Guard	Cornell
2	6	Chen Ting-Lin	Forward / center	ISU

- Reference：

On October 13, 2026, the second rounder, Chen Ting-Lin was not registered in the 2026–27 TPBL season rosters.

== Roster ==
Kaohsiung Aquas roster
Players
Coaches

Pos.	No.	Nat.	Name	Ht.	Wt.	Age	From
G/F	3	(United States) (Taiwan)	Adam Hinton	1.94 m (6 ft 4 in)	100 kg (220 lb)	23 – 9 July 2003	Cornell
G	7	(Taiwan)	Yu Huan-Ya	1.82 m (6 ft 0 in)	81 kg (179 lb)	32 – 30 November 1993	NTNU
G/F	8	(Taiwan)	Chiu Tzu-Hsuan	1.90 m (6 ft 3 in)	89 kg (196 lb)	26 – 8 December 1999	ISU
SF	9	(Taiwan)	Tang Wei-Chieh (injured)	1.92 m (6 ft 4 in)	89 kg (196 lb)	27 – 25 September 1999	VMI
PF	10	(Taiwan)	Hu Long-Mao (injured)	1.96 m (6 ft 5 in)	101 kg (223 lb)	33 – 22 December 1992	Chaminade
G/F	11	(Taiwan)	Shih Chin-Yao	1.88 m (6 ft 2 in)	86 kg (190 lb)	36 – 28 October 1990	CCU
G	12	(United States)	Hunter Maldonado (I)	1.98 m (6 ft 6 in)	90 kg (198 lb)	27 – 24 March 1999	Wyoming
PF/C	21	(Taiwan)	Lu Wei-Ting	2.01 m (6 ft 7 in)	103 kg (227 lb)	29 – 16 April 1997	ISU
G/F	24	(Taiwan)	Su Wen-Ju	1.87 m (6 ft 2 in)	78 kg (172 lb)	29 – 16 October 1997	ISU
PF/C	25	(Hungary) (United States)	Rosco Allen (I)	2.08 m (6 ft 10 in)	100 kg (220 lb)	33 – 5 May 1993	Stanford
G/F	28	(Taiwan)	Yu Chun-An (C)	1.89 m (6 ft 2 in)	83 kg (183 lb)	34 – 13 February 1992	NTNU
SF	30	(Taiwan)	Mayaw Fotol	1.90 m (6 ft 3 in)	95 kg (209 lb)	23 – 7 July 2003	NTSU
PF	52	(Brazil)	Gabriel Galvanini (I)	2.04 m (6 ft 8 in)	100 kg (220 lb)	28 – 11 September 1998	Brazil
SF	57	(Taiwan)	Wu Siao-Jin	1.90 m (6 ft 3 in)	81 kg (179 lb)	31 – 28 August 1995	NKNU
G	66	(Taiwan)	Chen Huai-An	1.86 m (6 ft 1 in)	86 kg (190 lb)	29 – 29 April 1997	NTUA
PF/C	00	(United States) (Italy)	Grant Basile (injured) (I)	2.06 m (6 ft 9 in)	105 kg (231 lb)	26 – 19 April 2000	Virginia Tech

Head coach

- (New Zealand) Zico Coronel

Assistant coach(es)

- (United States) (Italy) Nick Schlitzer
- (Taiwan) Liao Che-Yi
- (Taiwan) Lee Cheng-Yen
- (Taiwan) Yen Hua-Wei
- (Taiwan) Zhu Yong-Hong

Athletic trainer(s)

- (Taiwan) Huang Yu-Jiun
- (Taiwan) Liao Hsuan-Yi
- (Taiwan) Wu You-Ting

Legend

- (C) Team captain
- (I) Import player
- Injured

- Roster
- Transactions
Updated: November 21, 2026

== Preseason ==
=== Game log ===
2026 preseason game log
Total: 1–1 (home: 1–0; road: 0–1)
Preseason : 1–1 (home: 1–0; road: 0–1)

Game	Date	Team	Score	High points	High rebounds	High assists	Location Attendance	Record
1	October 9	@ DEA	L 133–136 (OT)	Rosco Allen (35)	Rosco Allen (15)	Hunter Maldonado (6); Yu Huan-Ya (6)	Taipei Heping Basketball Gymnasium	0–1
2	October 10	Lioneers	W 134–110	Rosco Allen (29)	Rosco Allen (11)	Rosco Allen (7); Hunter Maldonado (7)	Taipei Heping Basketball Gymnasium	1–1

Color： Win Lose
Schedule

== Regular season ==
=== Standings ===
Pos	Team	Pld	W	L	PCT	GB	Qualification
1	Kaohsiung Aquas	6	4	2	.667	—	Advance to semifinals
2	New Taipei Kings	5	3	2	.600	0.5	Advance to semifinals
3	New Taipei CTBC DEA	4	2	2	.500	1	Advance to semifinals
4	Taipei Taishin Mars	4	2	2	.500	1	Advance to play-in
5	Taoyuan Taiwan Beer Leopards	4	2	2	.500	1	Advance to play-in
6	Hsinchu Toplus Lioneers	3	1	2	.333	1.5	
7	Formosa Dreamers	4	1	3	.250	2	

Source: TPBL

=== Game log ===
2026–27 regular season game log
Total: 4–2 (home: 1–1; road: 3–1)
October : 2–1 (home: 1–0; road: 1–1)

Game	Date	Team	Score	High points	High rebounds	High assists	Location Attendance	Record
1	October 18	@ Dreamers	L 114–115	Grant Basile (36)	Grant Basile (14)	Chen Huai-An (8)	Taichung Intercontinental Basketball Stadium; 2,889	0–1
2	October 25	@ Lioneers	W 132–129 (2OT)	Rosco Allen (42)	Rosco Allen (22)	Su Wen-Ju (7)	Hsinchu County Stadium; 5,463	1–1
3	October 31	Mars	W 132–121	Grant Basile (37)	Grant Basile (13)	Rosco Allen (11)	Kaohsiung Arena; 10,824	2–1

November : 2–1 (home: 0–1; road: 2–0)

Game	Date	Team	Score	High points	High rebounds	High assists	Location Attendance	Record
4	November 1	DEA	L 100–128	Adam Hinton (14); Rosco Allen (14)	Rosco Allen (8)	Rosco Allen (4); Chen Huai-An (4); Gabriel Galvanini (4)	Kaohsiung Arena; 5,875	2–2
5	November 14	@ DEA	W 106–104	Rosco Allen (25)	Rosco Allen (10)	Hunter Maldonado (10)	Xinzhuang Gymnasium; 4,282	3–2
6	November 21	@ Dreamers	W 107–90	Gabriel Galvanini (27)	Gabriel Galvanini (16)	Yu Huan-Ya (9)	Taichung Intercontinental Basketball Stadium; 2,197	4–2

December : 0–0 (home: 0–0; road: 0–0)

Game	Date	Team	Score	High points	High rebounds	High assists	Location Attendance	Record
7	December 5	Leopards	0–0	()	()	()	Kaohsiung Arena	–
8	December 6	Dreamers	0–0	()	()	()	Kaohsiung Arena	–
9	December 13	@ DEA	0–0	()	()	()	Xinzhuang Gymnasium	–
10	December 19	@ Kings	0–0	()	()	()	Xinzhuang Gymnasium	–
11	December 26	Lioneers	0–0	()	()	()	Kaohsiung Arena	–
12	December 27	Dreamers	0–0	()	()	()	Kaohsiung Arena	–

January : 0–0 (home: 0–0; road: 0–0)

Game	Date	Team	Score	High points	High rebounds	High assists	Location Attendance	Record
13	January 2	Kings	0–0	()	()	()	Kaohsiung Arena	–
14	January 3	Mars	0–0	()	()	()	Kaohsiung Arena	–
15	January 9	@ Lioneers	0–0	()	()	()	Hsinchu County Stadium	–
16	January 17	@ Mars	0–0	()	()	()	Taipei Heping Basketball Gymnasium	–
17	January 24	@ Leopards	0–0	()	()	()	Taoyuan Arena	–

February : 0–0 (home: 0–0; road: 0–0)

Game	Date	Team	Score	High points	High rebounds	High assists	Location Attendance	Record
18	February 13	DEA	0–0	()	()	()	Kaohsiung Arena	–
19	February 14	Lioneers	0–0	()	()	()	Kaohsiung Arena	–
20	February 17	Leopards	0–0	()	()	()	Kaohsiung Arena	–
21	February 19	Dreamers	0–0	()	()	()	Kaohsiung Arena	–
22	February 27	@ Mars	0–0	()	()	()	Taipei Heping Basketball Gymnasium	–

March : 0–0 (home: 0–0; road: 0–0)

Game	Date	Team	Score	High points	High rebounds	High assists	Location Attendance	Record
23	March 7	@ Kings	0–0	()	()	()		–
24	March 14	@ Dreamers	0–0	()	()	()	Taichung Intercontinental Basketball Stadium	–
25	March 20	@ Lioneers	0–0	()	()	()	Hsinchu County Stadium	–
26	March 27	Lioneers	0–0	()	()	()	Kaohsiung Arena	–
27	March 28	Kings	0–0	()	()	()	Kaohsiung Arena	–

April : 0–0 (home: 0–0; road: 0–0)

Game	Date	Team	Score	High points	High rebounds	High assists	Location Attendance	Record
28	April 3	@ Leopards	0–0	()	()	()	Taoyuan Arena	–
29	April 9	@ DEA	0–0	()	()	()		–
30	April 17	DEA	0–0	()	()	()	Kaohsiung Arena	–
31	April 18	Mars	0–0	()	()	()	Kaohsiung Arena	–
32	April 24	Kings	0–0	()	()	()	Kaohsiung Arena	–
33	April 25	Leopards	0–0	()	()	()	Kaohsiung Arena	–

May : 0–0 (home: 0–0; road: 0–0)

Game	Date	Team	Score	High points	High rebounds	High assists	Location Attendance	Record
34	May 1	@ Leopards	0–0	()	()	()	Taoyuan Arena	–
35	May 7	@ Kings	0–0	()	()	()	Xinzhuang Gymnasium	–
36	May 9	@ Mars	0–0	()	()	()	Taipei Heping Basketball Gymnasium	–

Color： Win Lose
Schedule

== Player statistics ==
Legend
GP	Games played	MPG	Minutes per game	FG%	Field goal percentage
3P%	3-point field goal percentage	FT%	Free throw percentage	RPG	Rebounds per game
APG	Assists per game	SPG	Steals per game	BPG	Blocks per game
PPG	Points per game		Led the league

=== Regular season ===
Player	GP	MPG	PPG	FG%	3P%	FT%	RPG	APG	SPG	BPG
Adam Hinton										
Yu Huan-Ya										
Chiu Tzu-Hsuan										
Tang Wei-Chieh										
Hu Long-Mao										
Shih Chin-Yao										
Hunter Maldonado										
Lu Wei-Ting										
Su Wen-Ju										
Rosco Allen										
Yu Chun-An										
Mayaw Fotol										
Gabriel Galvanini										
Wu Siao-Jin										
Chen Huai-An										
Grant Basile										

- Reference：

== Transactions ==
=== Overview ===
Players added

Via draft

- Adam Hinton

Via free agency

- Rosco Allen
- Grant Basile
- Gabriel Galvanini
Players lost

Via free agency

- Bogdan Bliznyuk
- Kristijan Krajina
- Wei Liang-Che
- Wu Yen-Lun
- Rade Zagorac
- Edgaras Želionis

Retirement

- Chin Ming-Ching

=== Free agency ===
==== Re-signed ====
Date	Player	Contract terms	Ref.
July 27, 2026	Hunter Maldonado	—N/a	
August 2, 2026	Tang Wei-Chieh	—N/a	

==== Additions ====
Date	Player	Contract terms	Former team	Ref.
July 17, 2025	Adam Hinton	Multi-year contract, worth unknown	(United States) Cornell	
July 28, 2025	Rosco Allen	—N/a	(Japan) Kawasaki Brave Thunders	
July 29, 2025	Grant Basile	—N/a	(Puerto Rico) Piratas de Quebradillas	
July 30, 2025	Gabriel Galvanini	—N/a	(Uruguay) Peñarol	

==== Subtractions ====
Date	Player	Reason	New team	Ref.
July 26, 2025	Edgaras Želionis	Contract expired	(Mexico) El Calor de Cancún	
July 26, 2025	Bogdan Bliznyuk	Contract expired	(Taiwan) New Taipei CTBC DEA	
July 26, 2025	Kristijan Krajina	Contract expired	(Croatia) KK Virtus Zagreb	
July 26, 2025	Rade Zagorac	Contract expired	—N/a	
August 1, 2025	Wei Liang-Che	Contract expired	(China) Shanxi Loongs	
August 1, 2025	Wu Yen-Lun	Contract expired	—N/a	
August 2, 2025	Chin Ming-Ching	Retirement	(Taiwan) Kaohsiung Aquas strength and conditioning coach	

== Awards ==
=== Player of the Week ===
Week	Recipient	Award	Ref.
2	Rosco Allen	Week 2 Player of the Week (import)	
