= 2026–27 Hsinchu Toplus Lioneers season =

Taiwanese professional basketball season

- President: Chen Mei-Ling (passed away)
- General Manager: Chang Shu-Jen
- Head Coach: Wesam Al-Sous
- Arena: Hsinchu County Stadium

TPBL results
- Record: 1–2 (33.3%)
- Place: TBD
- Playoffs finish: TBD

The 2026–27 Hsinchu Toplus Lioneers season is the franchise's seventh season, its third season in the Taiwan Professional Basketball League (TPBL).

The Lioneers are coached by Wesam Al-Sous in his third year as head coach. On November 6, 2026, the Lioneers announced the death of Chen Mei-Ling.

== Draft ==
Round	Pick	Player	Position(s)	School / club team
1	4	Fu Yu	Guard / forward	West Virginia Tech
2	8	Benjamin Cheung	Guard	Occidental

- Reference：

== Roster ==
Hsinchu Toplus Lioneers roster
Players
Coaches

Pos.	No.	Nat.	Name	Ht.	Wt.	Age	From
PG	1	(United States) (Taiwan)	Jade Tse	1.85 m (6 ft 1 in)	86 kg (190 lb)	26 – 19 March 2000	Queens
PF/C	2	(United States)	Drew Pember (I)	2.10 m (6 ft 11 in)	95 kg (209 lb)	26 – 14 June 2000	UNC Asheville
PG	3	(Taiwan)	Chen Li-Sheng	1.75 m (5 ft 9 in)	72 kg (159 lb)	24 – 16 September 2002	NTSU
F	6	(United States) (Taiwan)	Benjamin Cheung	1.91 m (6 ft 3 in)	89 kg (196 lb)	23 – 25 September 2003	Occidental
PG	7	(Taiwan)	Tseng Po-Yu (C)	1.84 m (6 ft 0 in)	88 kg (194 lb)	29 – 3 December 1996	MDU
SG	8	(Taiwan)	Wang Lu-Hsiang	1.84 m (6 ft 0 in)	84 kg (185 lb)	28 – 21 December 1997	CCUT
SG	13	(Taiwan)	Liu Cheng-Hsun	1.90 m (6 ft 3 in)	92 kg (203 lb)	23 – 10 April 2003	UCH
SG	14	(Taiwan)	Fu Yu	1.88 m (6 ft 2 in)	85 kg (187 lb)	22 – 27 February 2004	West Virginia Tech
PF	17	(Taiwan)	Tsai Cheng-Kang	1.97 m (6 ft 6 in)	98 kg (216 lb)	24 – 8 November 2002	UCH
PF	25	(Taiwan) (Germany)	Karl Breuer	1.90 m (6 ft 3 in)	90 kg (198 lb)	25 – 19 April 2001	NTUA
SF	28	(Taiwan)	Chu Yun-Hao	1.95 m (6 ft 5 in)	97 kg (214 lb)	29 – 3 November 1997	UCH
C	32	(United States)	Justin Alston (I)	2.04 m (6 ft 8 in)	104 kg (229 lb)	32 – 2 July 1994	Boston University
C	33	(Mali)	Cheick Diallo (I)	2.03 m (6 ft 8 in)	99 kg (218 lb)	30 – 13 September 1996	Kansas
C	35	(Canada)	Sim Bhullar (I)	2.26 m (7 ft 5 in)	140 kg (309 lb)	33 – 2 December 1992	New Mexico State
PF	41	(Taiwan)	Su Yi-Chin	1.95 m (6 ft 5 in)	95 kg (209 lb)	32 – 29 December 1993	MDU
SG	42	(Taiwan)	Lu Kuan-Hsuan (C)	1.84 m (6 ft 0 in)	92 kg (203 lb)	31 – 2 April 1995	NTNU

Head coach

- (Jordan) (United States) Wesam Al-Sous

Assistant coach(es)

- (United States) Jacob Tyler
- (Taiwan) Chen Tse-Yu
- (Taiwan) Kuo Yen-En

Strength & conditioning coach(es)

- (Taiwan) Chen Hung-Lin
- (Taiwan) Chu Ming-Han

Athletic trainer(s)

- (Taiwan) Ou Po-Hung
- (Taiwan) Hsu Teng-Wen

Physician(s)

- (Taiwan) Ou Po-Hung
- (Taiwan) Hsu Teng-Wen

Team manager

- (Taiwan) Chang Shu-Jen

Legend

- (C) Team captain
- (I) Import player
- Injured

- Roster
- Transactions
Updated: October 26, 2026

== Preseason ==
=== Game log ===
2026 preseason game log
Total: 0–2 (home: 0–1; road: 0–1)
Preseason : 0–2 (home: 0–1; road: 0–1)

Game	Date	Team	Score	High points	High rebounds	High assists	Location Attendance	Record
1	October 10	@ Aquas	L 110–134	Liu Cheng-Hsun (21); Cheick Diallo (21)	Justin Alston (12)	Lu Kuan-Hsuan (3)	Taipei Heping Basketball Gymnasium	0–1
2	October 11	Kings	L 97–100	Liu Cheng-Hsun (19); Cheick Diallo (19)	Drew Pember (8); Cheick Diallo (8)	Tseng Po-Yu (5)	Taipei Heping Basketball Gymnasium	0–2

Color： Win Lose
Schedule

== Regular season ==
=== Standings ===
Pos	Team	Pld	W	L	PCT	GB	Qualification
1	Taipei Taishin Mars	3	2	1	.667	—	Advance to semifinals
2	Taoyuan Taiwan Beer Leopards	3	2	1	.667	—	Advance to semifinals
3	Kaohsiung Aquas	4	2	2	.500	0.5	Advance to semifinals
4	New Taipei Kings	4	2	2	.500	0.5	Advance to play-in
5	New Taipei CTBC DEA	2	1	1	.500	0.5	Advance to play-in
6	Hsinchu Toplus Lioneers	3	1	2	.333	1	
7	Formosa Dreamers	3	1	2	.333	1	

Source: TPBL

=== Game log ===
2026–27 regular season game log
Total: 1–2 (home: 0–1; road: 1–1)
October : 0–1 (home: 0–1; road: 0–0)

Game	Date	Team	Score	High points	High rebounds	High assists	Location Attendance	Record
—	October 24	Dreamers	Postponed to March 17					
1	October 25	Aquas	L 129–132 (2OT)	Cheick Diallo (41)	Cheick Diallo (19)	Tseng Po-Yu (9)	Hsinchu County Stadium; 5,463	0–1

November : 1–1 (home: 0–0; road: 1–1)

Game	Date	Team	Score	High points	High rebounds	High assists	Location Attendance	Record
2	November 1	@ Kings	W 95–93	Drew Pember (18)	Cheick Diallo (12)	Drew Pember (6)	Xinzhuang Gymnasium; 4,109	1–1
3	November 14	@ Leopards	L 95–100 (OT)	Lu Kuan-Hsuan (23)	Drew Pember (20)	Drew Pember (6)	Taoyuan Arena; 4,933	1–2
4	November 25	@ Dreamers	0–0	()	()	()	Taichung Intercontinental Basketball Stadium	–

December : 0–0 (home: 0–0; road: 0–0)

Game	Date	Team	Score	High points	High rebounds	High assists	Location Attendance	Record
5	December 5	Mars	0–0	()	()	()	Hsinchu County Stadium	–
6	December 6	DEA	0–0	()	()	()	Hsinchu County Stadium	–
7	December 20	@ Kings	0–0	()	()	()	Xinzhuang Gymnasium	–
8	December 26	@ Aquas	0–0	()	()	()	Kaohsiung Arena	–
9	December 30	@ Mars	0–0	()	()	()	Taipei Heping Basketball Gymnasium	–

January : 0–0 (home: 0–0; road: 0–0)

Game	Date	Team	Score	High points	High rebounds	High assists	Location Attendance	Record
10	January 3	@ DEA	0–0	()	()	()	Xinzhuang Gymnasium	–
11	January 6	Kings	0–0	()	()	()	Hsinchu County Stadium	–
12	January 9	Aquas	0–0	()	()	()	Hsinchu County Stadium	–
13	January 10	Leopards	0–0	()	()	()	Hsinchu County Stadium	–
14	January 16	@ Dreamers	0–0	()	()	()	Taichung Intercontinental Basketball Stadium	–
15	January 23	@ Mars	0–0	()	()	()	Taipei Heping Basketball Gymnasium	–
16	January 30	@ Leopards	0–0	()	()	()	Taoyuan Arena	–

February : 0–0 (home: 0–0; road: 0–0)

Game	Date	Team	Score	High points	High rebounds	High assists	Location Attendance	Record
17	February 14	@ Aquas	0–0	()	()	()	Kaohsiung Arena	–
18	February 20	DEA	0–0	()	()	()	Hsinchu County Stadium	–
19	February 21	Dreamers	0–0	()	()	()	Hsinchu County Stadium	–

March : 0–0 (home: 0–0; road: 0–0)

Game	Date	Team	Score	High points	High rebounds	High assists	Location Attendance	Record
20	March 7	@ Mars	0–0	()	()	()	Taipei Heping Basketball Gymnasium	–
21	March 13	@ Kings	0–0	()	()	()		–
22	March 17	Dreamers	0–0	()	()	()	Hsinchu County Stadium	–
23	March 20	Aquas	0–0	()	()	()	Hsinchu County Stadium	–
24	March 21	Mars	0–0	()	()	()	Hsinchu County Stadium	–
25	March 27	@ Aquas	0–0	()	()	()	Kaohsiung Arena	–

April : 0–0 (home: 0–0; road: 0–0)

Game	Date	Team	Score	High points	High rebounds	High assists	Location Attendance	Record
26	April 3	@ DEA	0–0	()	()	()		–
27	April 10	Leopards	0–0	()	()	()	Hsinchu County Stadium	–
28	April 11	Kings	0–0	()	()	()	Hsinchu County Stadium	–
29	April 18	@ Dreamers	0–0	()	()	()	Taichung Intercontinental Basketball Stadium	–
30	April 24	Mars	0–0	()	()	()	Hsinchu County Stadium	–
31	April 25	DEA	0–0	()	()	()	Hsinchu County Stadium	–

May : 0–0 (home: 0–0; road: 0–0)

Game	Date	Team	Score	High points	High rebounds	High assists	Location Attendance	Record
32	May 2	@ Leopards	0–0	()	()	()	Taoyuan Arena	–
33	May 5	Leopards	0–0	()	()	()	Hsinchu County Stadium	–
34	May 8	Dreamers	0–0	()	()	()	Hsinchu County Stadium	–
35	May 9	Kings	0–0	()	()	()	Hsinchu County Stadium	–
36	May 16	@ DEA	0–0	()	()	()	Xinzhuang Gymnasium	–

Color： Win Lose Postponed
Schedule

=== Regular season note ===
- Due to the Typhoon Champi, the TPBL declared that the game on October 24, 2026, would be postponed to March 17, 2027.

== Player statistics ==
Legend
GP	Games played	MPG	Minutes per game	FG%	Field goal percentage
3P%	3-point field goal percentage	FT%	Free throw percentage	RPG	Rebounds per game
APG	Assists per game	SPG	Steals per game	BPG	Blocks per game
PPG	Points per game		Led the league

=== Regular season ===
Player	GP	MPG	PPG	FG%	3P%	FT%	RPG	APG	SPG	BPG
Jade Tse										
Drew Pember										
Chen Li-Sheng										
Benjamin Cheung										
Tseng Po-Yu										
Wang Lu-Hsiang										
Liu Cheng-Hsun										
Fu Yu										
Tsai Cheng-Kang										
Karl Breuer										
Chu Yun-Hao										
Justin Alston										
Cheick Diallo										
Sim Bhullar										
Su Yi-Chin										
Lu Kuan-Hsuan										

- Reference：

== Transactions ==
=== Overview ===
Players added

Via draft

- Benjamin Cheung
- Fu Yu

Via free agency

- Justin Alston
- Chen Li-Sheng
- Cheick Diallo
- Su Yi-Chin
- Wang Lu-Hsiang
Players lost

Via free agency

- TJ Holyfield
- Hsiao Shun-Yi
- Kao Kuo-Hao
- Lee Chia-Jui
- Marin Marić
- Anžejs Pasečņiks

Waived

- Lee Chi-Wei
- Tien Hao

=== Free agency ===
==== Re-signed ====
Date	Player	Contract terms	Ref.
June 18, 2026	Tsai Cheng-Kang	3+2-year extension contract, worth unknown	
June 24, 2026	Tseng Po-Yu	—N/a	
June 24, 2026	Lu Kuan-Hsuan	—N/a	
July 1, 2026	Drew Pember	—N/a	
July 21, 2026	Liu Cheng-Hsun	Multi-year extension contract, worth unknown	
August 11, 2026	Jade Tse	—N/a	
August 12, 2026	Sim Bhullar	—N/a	

==== Additions ====
Date	Player	Contract terms	Former team	Ref.
July 14, 2026	Chen Li-Sheng	—N/a	(Taiwan) Taoyuan Pauian Pilots	
July 17, 2026	Su Yi-Chin	—N/a	(Taiwan) Taipei Taishin Mars	
July 31, 2026	Fu Yu	—N/a	(United States) West Virginia Tech	
July 31, 2026	Benjamin Cheung	—N/a	(United States) Occidental	
August 5, 2026	Cheick Diallo	—N/a	(Puerto Rico) Osos de Manatí	
August 26, 2026	Justin Alston	—N/a	(Turkey) Karşıyaka Basket	
September 8, 2026	Wang Lu-Hsiang	—N/a	(Taiwan) TSG GhostHawks	

==== Subtractions ====
Date	Player	Reason	New team	Ref.
June 30, 2026	Lee Chi-Wei	Contract terminated	(Taiwan) Taipei Fubon Braves	
July 14, 2026	Tien Hao	Contract terminated	Taiwan Beer	
July 22, 2026	Lee Chia-Jui	Contract expired	(Taiwan) Yankey Ark	
July 28, 2026	Hsiao Shun-Yi	Contract expired	(Taiwan) New Taipei Kings	
August 20, 2026	Marin Marić	Contract expired	(Taiwan) Taipei Taishin Mars	
August 26, 2026	Anžejs Pasečņiks	Contract expired	(Turkey) Petkim Spor	
August 26, 2026	TJ Holyfield	Contract expired	(Israel) Hapoel Holon	
August 31, 2026	Kao Kuo-Hao	Contract expired	(Taiwan) TSG GhostHawks	

== Awards ==
=== Player of the Week ===
Week	Recipient	Award	Ref.
3	Drew Pember	Week 3 Player of the Week (import)	
