= 2026–27 Taoyuan Taiwan Beer Leopards season =

Taiwanese professional basketball season

- President: Liu Chin-Liang
- Head Coach: Henrik Rödl
- Arena: Taoyuan Arena

TPBL results
- Record: 2–2 (50.0%)
- Place: TBD
- Playoffs finish: TBD

The 2026–27 Taoyuan Taiwan Beer Leopards season is the franchise's sixth season, its third season in the Taiwan Professional Basketball League (TPBL).

The Leopards are coached by Henrik Rödl in his second year as their head coach.

== Draft ==
The Leopards did not select any players in the 2026 TPBL draft.

== Roster ==
Taoyuan Taiwan Beer Leopards roster
Players
Coaches

Pos.	No.	Nat.	Name	Ht.	Wt.	Age	From
PG	5	(Taiwan)	Gao Jin-Wei (C)	1.77 m (5 ft 10 in)	66 kg (146 lb)	26 – 23 October 2000	UCH
PG	6	(Taiwan)	Hsu Hong-Wei	1.73 m (5 ft 8 in)	77 kg (170 lb)	24 – 15 October 2002	UCH
SG	8	(Taiwan)	Wang Jhe-Yu	1.90 m (6 ft 3 in)	88 kg (194 lb)	24 – 18 March 2002	NTUST
F	9	(Taiwan)	Chang Chao-Chen	1.96 m (6 ft 5 in)	97 kg (214 lb)	26 – 2 September 2000	NTNU
F	10	(Australia)	Brock Motum (I)	2.08 m (6 ft 10 in)	111 kg (245 lb)	36 – 16 October 1990	Washington State
PG	11	(Taiwan)	Chuang Po-Yuan	1.85 m (6 ft 1 in)	85 kg (187 lb)	25 – 1 December 2000	FJU
SF	12	(Taiwan)	Lin Sin-Kuan	1.92 m (6 ft 4 in)	92 kg (203 lb)	24 – 9 May 2002	NTNU
SF	13	(United States)	Malcolm Miller (I)	2.01 m (6 ft 7 in)	95 kg (209 lb)	33 – 6 March 1993	Holy Cross
SF	18	(Nigeria)	Humphery Gabriel (I)	1.95 m (6 ft 5 in)	90 kg (198 lb)	28 – 15 December 1997	VNU
SF	20	(United States)	Thomas Wimbush (I)	2.01 m (6 ft 7 in)	91 kg (201 lb)	32 – 8 December 1993	Fairmont State
F	21	(Taiwan)	Wang Hao-Chi	1.95 m (6 ft 5 in)	95 kg (209 lb)	37 – 22 September 1989	HWU
PG	23	(United States) (Taiwan)	Kenneth Chien	1.86 m (6 ft 1 in)	88 kg (194 lb)	31 – 6 February 1995	Broward
SF	27	(Taiwan)	Huang Jhen	1.93 m (6 ft 4 in)	86 kg (190 lb)	36 – 27 June 1990	FJU
SF	31	(Taiwan)	Tung Yung-Chuan	1.90 m (6 ft 3 in)	92 kg (203 lb)	27 – 14 October 1999	NTNU
PG	57	(Taiwan) (Vietnam)	Tsao Xun-Xiang	1.83 m (6 ft 0 in)	80 kg (176 lb)	27 – 16 March 1999	NTUA
C	82	(Taiwan)	Liu Yuan-Kai	2.06 m (6 ft 9 in)	105 kg (231 lb)	35 – 9 July 1991	FJU

Head coach

- (Germany) Henrik Rödl

Assistant coach(es)

- (Taiwan) (Australia) Oscar Lin
- (Germany) Florian Wedell
- (Canada) Vincent Plante

Strength & conditioning coach(es)

- (Taiwan) Chen Tzu-Yi
- (Taiwan) Chou Tzu-Yao

Athletic trainer(s)

- (Taiwan) Chen Wei-Chih
- (Taiwan) Cheng Po-Wei

Legend

- (C) Team captain
- (I) Import player
- Injured

- Roster
- Transactions
Updated: November 14, 2026

== 2026 The Asian Tournament Chengdu Leg ==
=== Group match ===
August 17, 2026	Taoyuan Taiwan Beer Leopards	73–65	Sichuan Jincheng II	Chengdu
17:30 (UTC+8)	Scoring by quarter: 22–16, 14–11, 18–19, 19–19
	Pts: Wendell Lewis 22; Rebs: Wendell Lewis 8 Asts: Lin Sin-Kuan 6	boxscore	Pts: Wang Zihan 23; Rebs: Ying Wuheng 5 Asts: Luo Hao 4	Arena: Jianyang Cultural and Sports Center Gymnasium

August 18, 2026	Nihon Tengus	76–95	Taoyuan Taiwan Beer Leopards	Chengdu
20:00 (UTC+8)	Scoring by quarter: 19–24, 16–26, 20–21, 21–24
	Pts: Kody Finch 15; Rebs: Ross Davis 12; Asts: Ross Davis 5	boxscore	Pts: Lin Sin-Kuan 22; Rebs: Wendell Lewis 7 Asts: Chuang Po-Yuan 5	Arena: Jianyang Cultural and Sports Center Gymnasium

August 19, 2026	Taoyuan Taiwan Beer Leopards	88–81	Macau Black Knights	Chengdu
17:30 (UTC+8)	Scoring by quarter: 20–21, 19–27, 27–14, 22–19
	Pts: Lin Sin-Kuan 27; Rebs: Wendell Lewis 10; Asts: Chuang Po-Yuan, Lin Sin-Kuan 3	boxscore	Pts: Cole Micek 22; Rebs: David Craig 9 Asts: Will Douglas 5	Arena: Jianyang Cultural and Sports Center Gymnasium

=== Quarterfinals ===
August 20, 2026	Taoyuan Taiwan Beer Leopards	56–59	Shenzhen New Century II	Chengdu
13:00 (UTC+8)	Scoring by quarter: 12–18, 15–11, 19–15, 10–15
	Pts: Wendell Lewis 19; Rebs: Wendell Lewis 7 Asts: Chuang Po-Yuan 3	boxscore	Pts: Wu Kaibo 18; Rebs: Ihor Serheiev 11; Asts: Lan Yilang 6	Arena: Jianyang Cultural and Sports Center Gymnasium

=== Classification 5th–8th place ===
August 22, 2026	Taoyuan Taiwan Beer Leopards	97–72	Macau Black Knights	Chengdu
13:00 (UTC+8)	Scoring by quarter: 17–21, 25–15, 24–16, 31–20
		boxscore		Arena: Jianyang Cultural and Sports Center Gymnasium

=== Fifth place game ===
August 23, 2026	Taoyuan Taiwan Beer Leopards	87–83	Nihon Tengus	Chengdu
18:00 (UTC+8)	Scoring by quarter: 18–21, 15–21, 24–28, 30–13
	Pts: Lin Sin-Kuan 25; Rebs: Wendell Lewis 13; Asts: Chuang Po-Yuan 4	boxscore	Pts: Irie Roman 17; Rebs: Zoran Talley 7 Asts: Zoran Talley 5	Arena: Jianyang Cultural and Sports Center Gymnasium

== Shiga Lakes Taiwan Camp ==
September 6, 2026
14:00 (UTC+8)

Shiga Lakes	97–87	Taoyuan Taiwan Beer Leopards

The Affiliated Taoyuan Agricultural & Industrial Senior High School of National Taipei University of Technology Student Activity Center, Taoyuan City

== Friendship Match 2026 ==
September 12, 2026
14:05 (UTC+9)

Taoyuan Taiwan Beer Leopards	85–80	Kumamoto Volters

Kumamoto Prefectural Gymnasium, Kumamoto

== Preseason ==
=== Game log ===
2026 preseason game log
Total: 0–2 (home: 0–1; road: 0–1)
Preseason : 0–2 (home: 0–1; road: 0–1)

Game	Date	Team	Score	High points	High rebounds	High assists	Location Attendance	Record
1	October 10	@ Kings	L 93–107	Brock Motum (30)	Brock Motum (9)	Gao Jin-Wei (9)	Taipei Heping Basketball Gymnasium	0–1
2	October 11	Mars	L 94–110	Thomas Wimbush (23)	Thomas Wimbush (9); Brock Motum (9)	Brock Motum (7)	Taipei Heping Basketball Gymnasium	0–2

Color： Win Lose
Schedule

== Regular season ==
=== Standings ===
Pos	Team	Pld	W	L	PCT	GB	Qualification
1	Taipei Taishin Mars	3	2	1	.667	—	Advance to semifinals
2	Kaohsiung Aquas	5	3	2	.600	—	Advance to semifinals
3	New Taipei Kings	5	3	2	.600	—	Advance to semifinals
4	Taoyuan Taiwan Beer Leopards	4	2	2	.500	0.5	Advance to play-in
5	Hsinchu Toplus Lioneers	3	1	2	.333	1	Advance to play-in
6	Formosa Dreamers	3	1	2	.333	1	
7	New Taipei CTBC DEA	3	1	2	.333	1	

Source: TPBL

=== Game log ===
2026–27 regular season game log
Total: 2–2 (home: 1–1; road: 1–1)
October : 1–0 (home: 0–0; road: 1–0)

Game	Date	Team	Score	High points	High rebounds	High assists	Location Attendance	Record
1	October 31	@ Kings	W 89–81	Malcolm Miller (22)	Brock Motum (11)	Gao Jin-Wei (5)	Xinzhuang Gymnasium; 4,202	1–0

November : 1–2 (home: 1–1; road: 0–1)

Game	Date	Team	Score	High points	High rebounds	High assists	Location Attendance	Record
2	November 8	@ Mars	L 91–102	Brock Motum (21)	Malcolm Miller (9)	Gao Jin-Wei (4); Tsao Xun-Xiang (4)	Taipei Heping Basketball Gymnasium; 4,826	1–1
3	November 14	Lioneers	W 100–95 (OT)	Thomas Wimbush (26)	Thomas Wimbush (12)	Gao Jin-Wei (6)	Taoyuan Arena; 4,933	2–1
4	November 15	Kings	L 93–110	Thomas Wimbush (23)	Brock Motum (10)	Brock Motum (3); Kenneth Chien (3); Gao Jin-Wei (3); Hsu Hong-Wei (3)	Taoyuan Arena; 5,233	2–2
5	November 27	@ Dreamers	0–0	()	()	()	Taichung Intercontinental Basketball Stadium	–

December : 0–0 (home: 0–0; road: 0–0)

Game	Date	Team	Score	High points	High rebounds	High assists	Location Attendance	Record
6	December 5	@ Aquas	0–0	()	()	()	Kaohsiung Arena	–
7	December 12	@ DEA	0–0	()	()	()	Xinzhuang Gymnasium	–
8	December 19	Dreamers	0–0	()	()	()	Taoyuan Arena	–
9	December 20	Mars	0–0	()	()	()	Taoyuan Arena	–
10	December 23	Kings	0–0	()	()	()	Taoyuan Arena	–
11	December 25	DEA	0–0	()	()	()	Taoyuan Arena	–

January : 0–0 (home: 0–0; road: 0–0)

Game	Date	Team	Score	High points	High rebounds	High assists	Location Attendance	Record
12	January 10	@ Lioneers	0–0	()	()	()	Hsinchu County Stadium	–
13	January 17	@ Dreamers	0–0	()	()	()	Taichung Intercontinental Basketball Stadium	–
14	January 23	DEA	0–0	()	()	()	Taoyuan Arena	–
15	January 24	Aquas	0–0	()	()	()	Taoyuan Arena	–
16	January 30	Lioneers	0–0	()	()	()	Taoyuan Arena	–
17	January 31	Mars	0–0	()	()	()	Taoyuan Arena	–

February : 0–0 (home: 0–0; road: 0–0)

Game	Date	Team	Score	High points	High rebounds	High assists	Location Attendance	Record
18	February 13	Dreamers	0–0	()	()	()	Taoyuan Arena	–
19	February 14	Kings	0–0	()	()	()	Taoyuan Arena	–
20	February 17	@ Aquas	0–0	()	()	()	Kaohsiung Arena	–
21	February 21	@ Kings	0–0	()	()	()	Xinzhuang Gymnasium	–
22	February 27	@ DEA	0–0	()	()	()	Xinzhuang Gymnasium	–

March : 0–0 (home: 0–0; road: 0–0)

Game	Date	Team	Score	High points	High rebounds	High assists	Location Attendance	Record
23	March 14	@ Kings	0–0	()	()	()		–
24	March 21	@ DEA	0–0	()	()	()		–
25	March 27	Mars	0–0	()	()	()	Taoyuan Arena	–
26	March 28	DEA	0–0	()	()	()	Taoyuan Arena	–

April : 0–0 (home: 0–0; road: 0–0)

Game	Date	Team	Score	High points	High rebounds	High assists	Location Attendance	Record
27	April 3	Aquas	0–0	()	()	()	Taoyuan Arena	–
28	April 4	Dreamers	0–0	()	()	()	Taoyuan Arena	–
29	April 10	@ Lioneers	0–0	()	()	()	Hsinchu County Stadium	–
30	April 14	@ Mars	0–0	()	()	()	Taipei Heping Basketball Gymnasium	–
31	April 25	@ Aquas	0–0	()	()	()	Kaohsiung Arena	–

May : 0–0 (home: 0–0; road: 0–0)

Game	Date	Team	Score	High points	High rebounds	High assists	Location Attendance	Record
32	May 1	Aquas	0–0	()	()	()	Taoyuan Arena	–
33	May 2	Lioneers	0–0	()	()	()	Taoyuan Arena	–
34	May 5	@ Lioneers	0–0	()	()	()	Hsinchu County Stadium	–
35	May 8	@ Mars	0–0	()	()	()	Taipei Heping Basketball Gymnasium	–
36	May 16	@ Dreamers	0–0	()	()	()	Taichung Intercontinental Basketball Stadium	–

Color： Win Lose
Schedule

== Player statistics ==
Legend
GP	Games played	MPG	Minutes per game	FG%	Field goal percentage
3P%	3-point field goal percentage	FT%	Free throw percentage	RPG	Rebounds per game
APG	Assists per game	SPG	Steals per game	BPG	Blocks per game
PPG	Points per game		Led the league

=== Regular season ===
Player	GP	MPG	PPG	FG%	3P%	FT%	RPG	APG	SPG	BPG
Gao Jin-Wei										
Hsu Hong-Wei										
Wang Jhe-Yu										
Chang Chao-Chen										
Brock Motum										
Chuang Po-Yuan										
Lin Sin-Kuan										
Malcolm Miller										
Humphery Gabriel										
Thomas Wimbush										
Wang Hao-Chi										
Kenneth Chien										
Huang Jhen										
Tung Yung-Chuan										
Tsao Xun-Xiang										
Liu Yuan-Kai										

- Reference：

== Transactions ==
=== Overview ===
Players added

Via trade

- Kenneth Chien

Via free agency

- Chang Chao-Chen
- Humphery Gabriel
- Brock Motum
- Thomas Wimbush
Players lost

Via free agency

- Cheick Diallo
- Lasan Kromah
- Chris McCullough
- Ting Kuang-Hao

Transfer to Taiwan Beer

- Lu Chi-Erh

=== Trades ===
Date	Trade		Ref.
August 11, 2026	To Taoyuan Taiwan Beer Leopards: Kenneth Chien	To Taipei Taishin Mars: 2027 Leopards' first-round pick; 2029 Leopards' first-round pick; Cash considerations	

=== Transfer to Taiwan Beer ===
Date	Player	Ref.
September 11, 2026	Lu Chi-Erh	

=== Free agency ===
==== Re-signed ====
Date	Player	Contract terms	Ref.
August 5, 2026	Malcolm Miller	—N/a	

==== Additions ====
Date	Player	Contract terms	Former team	Ref.
July 20, 2026	Chang Chao-Chen	—N/a	(Taiwan) Taipei Taishin Mars	
August 10, 2026	Brock Motum	—N/a	(Japan) Toyama Grouses	
August 10, 2026	Thomas Wimbush	—N/a	(Japan) Shiga Lakes	
October 1, 2026	Humphery Gabriel	—N/a	Taiwan Beer	

==== Subtractions ====
Date	Player	Reason	New team	Ref.
May 24, 2026	Chris McCullough	Contract expired	(Philippines) TNT Tropang 5G	
May 28, 2026	Cheick Diallo	Contract expired	(Puerto Rico) Osos de Manatí	
July 30, 2026	Lasan Kromah	Contract expired	(Taiwan) Taipei Fubon Braves	
October 13, 2026	Ting Kuang-Hao	Contract expired	—N/a	
