= 2026–27 Taipei Taishin Mars season =

Taiwanese professional basketball season

- President: Yang Yuan-Ming
- General Manager: Lin You-Ting
- Head Coach: Gianluca Tucci
- Arena: Taipei Heping Basketball Gymnasium

TPBL results
- Record: 2–2 (50.0%)
- Place: TBD
- Playoffs finish: TBD

The 2026–27 Taipei Taishin Mars season is the franchise's fourth season, its third season in the Taiwan Professional Basketball League (TPBL).

On July 1, 2026, the Mars announced that Milan Stevanovic left the team after contract expired. On September 24, the Mars hired Gianluca Tucci as their new head coach.

== Draft ==
Round	Pick	Player	Position(s)	School / club team
1	2	Wu Zhi-Kai	Forward	NCCU

- Reference：

== Roster ==
Taipei Taishin Mars roster
Players
Coaches

Pos.	No.	Nat.	Name	Ht.	Wt.	Age	From
SG	0	(Taiwan)	Lin Ting-Chien	1.92 m (6 ft 4 in)	85 kg (187 lb)	27 – 31 October 1999	Bryant
PG	2	(Taiwan)	Ting Sheng-Ju	1.74 m (5 ft 9 in)	75 kg (165 lb)	28 – 22 August 1998	St. Francis
PG	5	(Taiwan) (Vietnam)	Wei Peng-Ho (injured)	1.77 m (5 ft 10 in)	72 kg (159 lb)	23 – 3 January 2003	NTNU
SF	6	(Taiwan)	Chiang Chun	1.93 m (6 ft 4 in)	93 kg (205 lb)	25 – 11 September 2001	FJU
PF	7	(Taiwan)	Liu Yen-Ting	1.96 m (6 ft 5 in)	96 kg (212 lb)	26 – 7 January 2000	OCU
SF	8	(Taiwan)	Chen Wen-Hung (C)	1.88 m (6 ft 2 in)	98 kg (216 lb)	35 – 14 July 1991	NTSU
PF	10	(United States)	Bryan Griffin (I)	2.03 m (6 ft 8 in)	107 kg (236 lb)	28 – 30 April 1998	Xavier
SF	11	(Taiwan)	Huang Tsung-Han	1.93 m (6 ft 4 in)	96 kg (212 lb)	32 – 7 July 1994	MDU
SG	14	(Taiwan)	Wu Yung-Cheng (injured)	1.86 m (6 ft 1 in)	82 kg (181 lb)	30 – 19 October 1996	Sacramento State
SG	15	(Taiwan)	Xie Ming-Jun (injured)	1.90 m (6 ft 3 in)	85 kg (187 lb)	21 – 11 November 2005	SCA
C	16	(Taiwan)	Wang Sheng-Lin	2.05 m (6 ft 9 in)	105 kg (231 lb)	25 – 1 December 2000	LIT
SF	17	(Serbia)	Aleksandar Marelja (I)	2.07 m (6 ft 9 in)	107 kg (236 lb)	33 – 6 December 1992	Serbia
SF	23	(Taiwan)	Wu Zhi-Kai	1.96 m (6 ft 5 in)	90 kg (198 lb)	23 – 19 September 2003	NCCU
PG	25	(United States)	Tyrus McGee (I)	1.88 m (6 ft 2 in)	93 kg (205 lb)	35 – 14 March 1991	Iowa State
SF	33	(Taiwan) (United States)	Samuel Manu	1.97 m (6 ft 6 in)	91 kg (201 lb)	26 – 24 September 2000	UC Davis
C	34	(Croatia)	Marin Marić (I)	2.11 m (6 ft 11 in)	113 kg (249 lb)	32 – 21 February 1994	DePaul
C	62	(Taiwan)	Chen Kuan-Chuan	1.97 m (6 ft 6 in)	105 kg (231 lb)	32 – 30 December 1993	NTSU

Head coach

- (Italy) Gianluca Tucci

Assistant coach(es)

- (Taiwan) Hsu Hao-Cheng
- (Taiwan) Chen Shih-Nien
- (Taiwan) Hsu Shih-Ching

Strength & conditioning coach(es)

- (Taiwan) Chen Sheng-Chuan
- (Taiwan) Liu Yu-Jie

Athletic trainer(s)

- (Taiwan) Chien Shao-Fu
- (Taiwan) Wan Ting-Hsuan

Team manager

- (Taiwan) Lin You-Ting

Legend

- (C) Team captain
- (I) Import player
- Injured

- Roster
- Transactions
Updated: November 15, 2026

== Preseason ==
=== Game log ===
2026 preseason game log
Total: 2–0 (home: 0–0; road: 2–0)
Preseason : 2–0 (home: 0–0; road: 2–0)

Game	Date	Team	Score	High points	High rebounds	High assists	Location Attendance	Record
1	October 9	@ Dreamers	W 122–114	Tyrus McGee (29)	Marin Marić (13)	Lin Ting-Chien (6); Tyrus McGee (6)	Taipei Heping Basketball Gymnasium	1–0
2	October 11	@ Leopards	W 110–94	Lin Ting-Chien (18); Marin Marić (18)	Marin Marić (15)	Ting Sheng-Ju (6)	Taipei Heping Basketball Gymnasium	2–0

Color： Win Lose
Schedule

== Regular season ==
=== Standings ===
Pos	Team	Pld	W	L	PCT	GB	Qualification
1	Kaohsiung Aquas	5	3	2	.600	—	Advance to semifinals
2	New Taipei Kings	5	3	2	.600	—	Advance to semifinals
3	New Taipei CTBC DEA	4	2	2	.500	0.5	Advance to semifinals
4	Taipei Taishin Mars	4	2	2	.500	0.5	Advance to play-in
5	Taoyuan Taiwan Beer Leopards	4	2	2	.500	0.5	Advance to play-in
6	Hsinchu Toplus Lioneers	3	1	2	.333	1	
7	Formosa Dreamers	3	1	2	.333	1	

Source: TPBL

=== Game log ===
2026–27 regular season game log
Total: 2–2 (home: 2–0; road: 0–2)
October : 0–1 (home: 0–0; road: 0–1)

Game	Date	Team	Score	High points	High rebounds	High assists	Location Attendance	Record
—	October 24	@ DEA	Postponed					
1	October 31	@ Aquas	L 121–132	Lin Ting-Chien (26)	Marin Marić (10)	Lin Ting-Chien (7)	Kaohsiung Arena; 10,824	0–1

November : 2–1 (home: 2–0; road: 0–1)

Game	Date	Team	Score	High points	High rebounds	High assists	Location Attendance	Record
2	November 7	Dreamers	W 103–90	Marin Marić (31)	Marin Marić (15)	Lin Ting-Chien (8)	Taipei Heping Basketball Gymnasium; 5,486	1–1
3	November 8	Leopards	W 102–91	Lin Ting-Chien (29)	Marin Marić (16)	Ting Sheng-Ju (4)	Taipei Heping Basketball Gymnasium; 4,826	2–1
4	November 15	@ DEA	L 87–94	Samuel Manu (17)	Marin Marić (15)	Tyrus McGee (4); Ting Sheng-Ju (4)	Xinzhuang Gymnasium; 4,135	2–2

December : 0–0 (home: 0–0; road: 0–0)

Game	Date	Team	Score	High points	High rebounds	High assists	Location Attendance	Record
5	December 2	@ Kings	0–0	()	()	()	Xinzhuang Gymnasium	–
6	December 5	@ Lioneers	0–0	()	()	()	Hsinchu County Stadium	–
7	December 13	@ Dreamers	0–0	()	()	()	Taichung Intercontinental Basketball Stadium	–
8	December 20	@ Leopards	0–0	()	()	()	Taoyuan Arena	–
9	December 26	Kings	0–0	()	()	()	Taipei Heping Basketball Gymnasium	–
10	December 27	DEA	0–0	()	()	()	Taipei Heping Basketball Gymnasium	–
11	December 30	Lioneers	0–0	()	()	()	Taipei Heping Basketball Gymnasium	–

January : 0–0 (home: 0–0; road: 0–0)

Game	Date	Team	Score	High points	High rebounds	High assists	Location Attendance	Record
12	January 3	@ Aquas	0–0	()	()	()	Kaohsiung Arena	–
13	January 10	@ Dreamers	0–0	()	()	()	Taichung Intercontinental Basketball Stadium	–
14	January 16	Kings	0–0	()	()	()	Taipei Heping Basketball Gymnasium	–
15	January 17	Aquas	0–0	()	()	()	Taipei Heping Basketball Gymnasium	–
16	January 23	Lioneers	0–0	()	()	()	Taipei Heping Basketball Gymnasium	–
17	January 24	Dreamers	0–0	()	()	()	Taipei Heping Basketball Gymnasium	–
18	January 31	@ Leopards	0–0	()	()	()	Taoyuan Arena	–

February : 0–0 (home: 0–0; road: 0–0)

Game	Date	Team	Score	High points	High rebounds	High assists	Location Attendance	Record
19	February 20	@ Kings	0–0	()	()	()	Xinzhuang Gymnasium	–
20	February 27	Aquas	0–0	()	()	()	Taipei Heping Basketball Gymnasium	–
21	February 28	Kings	0–0	()	()	()	Taipei Heping Basketball Gymnasium	–

March : 0–0 (home: 0–0; road: 0–0)

Game	Date	Team	Score	High points	High rebounds	High assists	Location Attendance	Record
22	March 6	DEA	0–0	()	()	()	Taipei Heping Basketball Gymnasium	–
23	March 7	Lioneers	0–0	()	()	()	Taipei Heping Basketball Gymnasium	–
24	March 21	@ Lioneers	0–0	()	()	()	Hsinchu County Stadium	–
25	March 27	@ Leopards	0–0	()	()	()	Taoyuan Arena	–

April : 0–0 (home: 0–0; road: 0–0)

Game	Date	Team	Score	High points	High rebounds	High assists	Location Attendance	Record
26	April 4	@ DEA	0–0	()	()	()		–
27	April 10	Dreamers	0–0	()	()	()	Taipei Heping Basketball Gymnasium	–
28	April 11	DEA	0–0	()	()	()	Taipei Heping Basketball Gymnasium	–
29	April 14	Leopards	0–0	()	()	()	Taipei Heping Basketball Gymnasium	–
30	April 18	@ Aquas	0–0	()	()	()	Kaohsiung Arena	–
31	April 24	@ Lioneers	0–0	()	()	()	Hsinchu County Stadium	–
32	April 28	@ Kings	0–0	()	()	()	Xinzhuang Gymnasium	–

May : 0–0 (home: 0–0; road: 0–0)

Game	Date	Team	Score	High points	High rebounds	High assists	Location Attendance	Record
33	May 8	Leopards	0–0	()	()	()	Taipei Heping Basketball Gymnasium	–
34	May 9	Aquas	0–0	()	()	()	Taipei Heping Basketball Gymnasium	–
35	May 15	@ Dreamers	0–0	()	()	()	Taichung Intercontinental Basketball Stadium	–

Color： Win Lose Postponed
Schedule

=== Regular season note ===
- Due to the Typhoon Champi, the TPBL declared that the game on October 24 would be postponed.

== Player statistics ==
Legend
GP	Games played	MPG	Minutes per game	FG%	Field goal percentage
3P%	3-point field goal percentage	FT%	Free throw percentage	RPG	Rebounds per game
APG	Assists per game	SPG	Steals per game	BPG	Blocks per game
PPG	Points per game		Led the league

=== Regular season ===
Player	GP	MPG	PPG	FG%	3P%	FT%	RPG	APG	SPG	BPG
Lin Ting-Chien										
Ting Sheng-Ju										
Wei Peng-Ho										
Chiang Chun										
Liu Yen-Ting										
Chen Wen-Hung										
Bryan Griffin										
Huang Tsung-Han										
Wu Yung-Cheng										
Xie Ming-Jun										
Wang Sheng-Lin										
Aleksandar Marelja										
Wu Zhi-Kai										
Tyrus McGee										
Samuel Manu										
Marin Marić										
Chen Kuan-Chuan										

- Reference：

== Transactions ==
On August 5, 2026, the Taipei Taishin Mars announced to reach the buyout agreement of Lin Ping-Sheng with the Yankey Ark of the P. League+.

=== Overview ===
Players added

Via draft

- Wu Zhi-Kai

Via free agency

- Bryan Griffin
- Lin Ting-Chien
- Marin Marić
- Aleksandar Marelja
- Tyrus McGee
- Wang Sheng-Lin
- Wu Yung-Cheng
Players lost

Via trade

- Kenneth Chien

Via free agency

- Chang Chao-Chen
- Chang Keng-Yu
- Michael Frazier
- Makur Maker
- Youssou Ndoye
- Su Yi-Chin
- Sun Szu-Yao
- Darral Willis

=== Trades ===
Date	Trade		Ref.
August 11, 2026	To Taipei Taishin Mars: 2027 Leopards' first-round pick; 2029 Leopards' first-round pick; Cash considerations	To Taoyuan Taiwan Beer Leopards: Kenneth Chien	

=== Free agency ===
==== Re-signed ====
Date	Player	Contract terms	Ref.
July 9, 2026	Ting Sheng-Ju	Multi-year contract, worth unknown	
July 9, 2026	Chen Kuan-Chuan	Multi-year contract, worth unknown	
July 9, 2026	Huang Tsung-Han	Multi-year contract, worth unknown	
July 9, 2026	Liu Yen-Ting	Extension contract, worth unknown	

==== Additions ====
Date	Player	Contract terms	Former team	Ref.
August 3, 2026	Wu Zhi-Kai	—N/a	(Taiwan) NCCU	
August 4, 2026	Wang Sheng-Lin	—N/a	(Taiwan) Caesar Keelung Black Kites	
August 6, 2026	Lin Ting-Chien	Multi-year contract with overseas option, worth unknown	(China) Tianjin Pioneers	
August 12, 2026	Wu Yung-Cheng	—N/a	(Taiwan) Taipei Fubon Braves	
August 18, 2026	Tyrus McGee	—N/a	(Italy) Scaligera Basket Verona	
August 20, 2026	Marin Marić	—N/a	(Taiwan) Hsinchu Toplus Lioneers	
August 25, 2026	Bryan Griffin	—N/a	(Poland) PGE Start Lublin	
August 28, 2026	Aleksandar Marelja	—N/a	(Uruguay) SPD Radnički	

==== Subtractions ====
Date	Player	Reason	New team	Ref.
June 30, 2026	Su Yi-Chin	Contract expired	(Taiwan) Hsinchu Toplus Lioneers	
June 30, 2026	Chang Keng-Yu	Contract expired	Taiwan Beer	
June 30, 2026	Sun Szu-Yao	Contract expired	—N/a	
June 30, 2026	Chang Chao-Chen	Contract expired	Taoyuan Taiwan Beer Leopards	
August 10, 2026	Darral Willis	Contract expired	(Japan) Toyama Grouses	
August 28, 2026	Makur Maker	Contract expired	(Australia) Illawarra Hawks	
August 28, 2026	Michael Frazier	Contract expired	(Lebanon) Beirut Club	
August 28, 2026	Youssou Ndoye	Contract expired	(Tanzania) Dar City	

== Awards ==
=== Player of the Week ===
Week	Recipient	Award	Ref.
4	Lin Ting-Chien	Week 4 Player of the Week (local)	
4	Marin Marić	Week 4 Player of the Week (import)	
