= 2026–27 Formosa Dreamers season =

Taiwanese professional basketball season

- President: Tien Lei
- General Manager: Han Chun-Kai
- Head Coach: Douglas Creighton
- Arena: Taichung Intercontinental Basketball Stadium

TPBL results
- Record: 1–4 (20.0%)
- Place: TBD
- Playoffs finish: TBD

The 2026–27 Formosa Dreamers season is the franchise's 10th season, its third season in the Taiwan Professional Basketball League (TPBL).

The Dreamers are coached by Douglas Creighton in his second year as head coach.

== Draft ==
The Dreamers did not select any players in the 2026 TPBL draft.

== Roster ==
Formosa Dreamers roster
Players
Coaches

Pos.	No.	Nat.	Name	Ht.	Wt.	Age	From
SG	0	(Taiwan)	Chen Jen-Jei	1.83 m (6 ft 0 in)	83 kg (183 lb)	29 – 16 September 1997	Grand View
SF	2	(Taiwan)	Ma Chien-Hao	2.01 m (6 ft 7 in)	92 kg (203 lb)	25 – 29 April 2001	Georgia State
SG	3	(Taiwan)	Chang Tsung-Hsien (C)	1.92 m (6 ft 4 in)	88 kg (194 lb)	37 – 27 December 1988	BYU–Hawaii
PG	9	(Taiwan)	Wu Chia-Chun	1.74 m (5 ft 9 in)	70 kg (154 lb)	32 – 3 March 1994	NTSU
SF	10	(United States)	Stanton Kidd (I)	2.02 m (6 ft 8 in)	101 kg (223 lb)	34 – 18 March 1992	Colorado State
PG	11	(Taiwan)	Lin Chun-Chi	1.75 m (5 ft 9 in)	75 kg (165 lb)	28 – 29 January 1998	UCH
SG	20	(Taiwan)	Chien Wei-Ju	1.86 m (6 ft 1 in)	85 kg (187 lb)	34 – 20 January 1992	NTNU
C	26	(Taiwan)	Lee Te-Wei	2.00 m (6 ft 7 in)	105 kg (231 lb)	35 – 15 October 1991	CCUT
SF	27	(Taiwan)	Shih Cheng-Ping	1.90 m (6 ft 3 in)	85 kg (187 lb)	27 – 1 October 1999	ISU
SG	28	(Taiwan)	Lu Kuan-Liang (injured)	1.85 m (6 ft 1 in)	85 kg (187 lb)	35 – 9 April 1991	NTUA
PF	33	(United States)	Trey Thompkins (I)	2.08 m (6 ft 10 in)	105 kg (231 lb)	36 – 29 May 1990	Georgia
C	34	(United States) (Taiwan)	Brandon Gilbeck (I)	2.13 m (7 ft 0 in)	107 kg (236 lb)	29 – 9 December 1996	Western Illinois
PF	35	(United States)	Aric Holman (I)	2.08 m (6 ft 10 in)	100 kg (220 lb)	29 – 11 July 1997	Mississippi State
PG	41	(Taiwan)	Chiang Yu-An	1.74 m (5 ft 9 in)	75 kg (165 lb)	35 – 4 August 1991	NTUS
SF	42	(United States) (Taiwan)	Randall Walko	1.96 m (6 ft 5 in)	93 kg (205 lb)	28 – 21 September 1998	TCNJ
PF	50	(Ghana)	Ben Bentil (I)	2.04 m (6 ft 8 in)	107 kg (236 lb)	31 – 29 March 1995	Providence
PF	88	(Taiwan)	Chou Po-Chen	1.98 m (6 ft 6 in)	98 kg (216 lb)	36 – 8 August 1990	NTNU

Head coach

- (Taiwan) (United States) Douglas Creighton

Assistant coach(es)

- (Australia) Jamie Pearlman (associate HC)
- (Taiwan) Lai Po-Lin
- (Serbia) Milan Stevanovic

Athletic trainer(s)

- (Taiwan) Hou Yao-Hsin
- (Taiwan) Chen Tzu-Chieh

Team manager

- (Taiwan) Han Chun-Kai

Legend

- (C) Team captain
- (I) Import player
- Injured

- Roster
- Transactions
Updated: November 2, 2026

== Preseason ==
=== Game log ===
2026 preseason game log
Total: 1–1 (home: 0–1; road: 1–0)
Preseason : 1–1 (home: 0–1; road: 1–0)

Game	Date	Team	Score	High points	High rebounds	High assists	Location Attendance	Record
1	October 9	Mars	L 114–122	Stanton Kidd (22)	Aric Holman (13)	Aric Holman (6)	Taipei Heping Basketball Gymnasium	0–1
2	October 10	@ DEA	W 97–92	Lin Chun-Chi (23)	Aric Holman (9)	Chiang Yu-An (4)	Taipei Heping Basketball Gymnasium	1–1

Color： Win Lose
Schedule

== Regular season ==
=== Standings ===
Pos	Team	Pld	W	L	PCT	GB	Qualification
1	Kaohsiung Aquas	6	4	2	.667	—	Advance to semifinals
2	New Taipei Kings	5	3	2	.600	0.5	Advance to semifinals
3	New Taipei CTBC DEA	5	3	2	.600	0.5	Advance to semifinals
4	Taipei Taishin Mars	4	2	2	.500	1	Advance to play-in
5	Taoyuan Taiwan Beer Leopards	4	2	2	.500	1	Advance to play-in
6	Hsinchu Toplus Lioneers	3	1	2	.333	1.5	
7	Formosa Dreamers	5	1	4	.200	2.5	

Source: TPBL

=== Game log ===
2026–27 regular season game log
Total: 1–4 (home: 1–3; road: 0–1)
October : 1–1 (home: 1–1; road: 0–0)

Game	Date	Team	Score	High points	High rebounds	High assists	Location Attendance	Record
1	October 17	Kings	L 106–113 (OT)	Stanton Kidd (22)	Brandon Gilbeck (10); Stanton Kidd (10)	Stanton Kidd (3); Chen Jen-Jei (3)	Taichung Intercontinental Basketball Stadium; 3,000	0–1
2	October 18	Aquas	W 115–114	Brandon Gilbeck (23); Lin Chun-Chi (23)	Brandon Gilbeck (15)	Chiang Yu-An (4)	Taichung Intercontinental Basketball Stadium; 2,889	1–1
—	October 24	@ Lioneers	Postponed to March 17					

November : 0–3 (home: 0–2; road: 0–1)

Game	Date	Team	Score	High points	High rebounds	High assists	Location Attendance	Record
3	November 7	@ Mars	L 90–103	Lin Chun-Chi (24)	Brandon Gilbeck (14)	Lin Chun-Chi (5)	Taipei Heping Basketball Gymnasium; 5,486	1–2
4	November 21	Aquas	L 90–107	Chiang Yu-An (26)	Brandon Gilbeck (12)	Chiang Yu-An (6)	Taichung Intercontinental Basketball Stadium; 2,197	1–3
5	November 22	DEA	L 98–115	Brandon Gilbeck (18)	Aric Holman (11)	Lin Chun-Chi (6)	Taichung Intercontinental Basketball Stadium; 2,104	1–4
6	November 25	Lioneers	0–0	()	()	()	Taichung Intercontinental Basketball Stadium	–
7	November 27	Leopards	0–0	()	()	()	Taichung Intercontinental Basketball Stadium	–

December : 0–0 (home: 0–0; road: 0–0)

Game	Date	Team	Score	High points	High rebounds	High assists	Location Attendance	Record
8	December 6	@ Aquas	0–0	()	()	()	Kaohsiung Arena	–
9	December 12	Kings	0–0	()	()	()	Taichung Intercontinental Basketball Stadium	–
10	December 13	Mars	0–0	()	()	()	Taichung Intercontinental Basketball Stadium	–
11	December 19	@ Leopards	0–0	()	()	()	Taoyuan Arena	–
12	December 27	@ Aquas	0–0	()	()	()	Kaohsiung Arena	–

January : 0–0 (home: 0–0; road: 0–0)

Game	Date	Team	Score	High points	High rebounds	High assists	Location Attendance	Record
13	January 2	@ DEA	0–0	()	()	()	Xinzhuang Gymnasium	–
14	January 9	DEA	0–0	()	()	()	Taichung Intercontinental Basketball Stadium	–
15	January 10	Mars	0–0	()	()	()	Taichung Intercontinental Basketball Stadium	–
16	January 16	Lioneers	0–0	()	()	()	Taichung Intercontinental Basketball Stadium	–
17	January 17	Leopards	0–0	()	()	()	Taichung Intercontinental Basketball Stadium	–
18	January 24	@ Mars	0–0	()	()	()	Taipei Heping Basketball Gymnasium	–
19	January 30	@ Kings	0–0	()	()	()	Xinzhuang Gymnasium	–

February : 0–0 (home: 0–0; road: 0–0)

Game	Date	Team	Score	High points	High rebounds	High assists	Location Attendance	Record
20	February 13	@ Leopards	0–0	()	()	()	Taoyuan Arena	–
21	February 19	@ Aquas	0–0	()	()	()	Kaohsiung Arena	–
22	February 21	@ Lioneers	0–0	()	()	()	Hsinchu County Stadium	–
23	February 28	@ DEA	0–0	()	()	()	Xinzhuang Gymnasium	–

March : 0–0 (home: 0–0; road: 0–0)

Game	Date	Team	Score	High points	High rebounds	High assists	Location Attendance	Record
24	March 6	@ Kings	0–0	()	()	()		–
25	March 13	DEA	0–0	()	()	()	Taichung Intercontinental Basketball Stadium	–
26	March 14	Aquas	0–0	()	()	()	Taichung Intercontinental Basketball Stadium	–
27	March 17	@ Lioneers	0–0	()	()	()	Hsinchu County Stadium	–
28	March 26	@ DEA	0–0	()	()	()		–

April : 0–0 (home: 0–0; road: 0–0)

Game	Date	Team	Score	High points	High rebounds	High assists	Location Attendance	Record
29	April 4	@ Leopards	0–0	()	()	()	Taoyuan Arena	–
30	April 10	@ Mars	0–0	()	()	()	Taipei Heping Basketball Gymnasium	–
31	April 17	Kings	0–0	()	()	()	Taichung Intercontinental Basketball Stadium	–
32	April 18	Lioneers	0–0	()	()	()	Taichung Intercontinental Basketball Stadium	–

May : 0–0 (home: 0–0; road: 0–0)

Game	Date	Team	Score	High points	High rebounds	High assists	Location Attendance	Record
33	May 2	@ Kings	0–0	()	()	()	Xinzhuang Gymnasium	–
34	May 8	@ Lioneers	0–0	()	()	()	Hsinchu County Stadium	–
35	May 15	Mars	0–0	()	()	()	Taichung Intercontinental Basketball Stadium	–
36	May 16	Leopards	0–0	()	()	()	Taichung Intercontinental Basketball Stadium	–

Color： Win Lose Postponed
Schedule

=== Regular season note ===
- Due to the Typhoon Champi, the TPBL declared that the game on October 24, 2026, would be postponed to March 17, 2027.

== Player statistics ==
Legend
GP	Games played	MPG	Minutes per game	FG%	Field goal percentage
3P%	3-point field goal percentage	FT%	Free throw percentage	RPG	Rebounds per game
APG	Assists per game	SPG	Steals per game	BPG	Blocks per game
PPG	Points per game		Led the league

=== Regular season ===
Player	GP	MPG	PPG	FG%	3P%	FT%	RPG	APG	SPG	BPG
Chen Jen-Jei										
Ma Chien-Hao										
Chang Tsung-Hsien										
Wu Chia-Chun										
Stanton Kidd										
Lin Chun-Chi										
Chien Wei-Ju										
Lee Te-Wei										
Shih Cheng-Ping										
Lu Kuan-Liang										
Trey Thompkins										
Brandon Gilbeck										
Aric Holman										
Chiang Yu-An										
Randall Walko										
Ben Bentil										
Chou Po-Chen										

- Reference：

== Transactions ==
=== Overview ===
Players added

Via free agency

- Stanton Kidd
Players lost

=== Free agency ===
==== Re-signed ====
Date	Player	Contract terms	Ref.
July 2, 2026	Trey Thompkins	—N/a	
July 2, 2026	Ben Bentil	—N/a	
July 2, 2026	Aric Holman	—N/a	
July 2, 2026	Brandon Gilbeck	—N/a	
August 20, 2026	Chang Tsung-Hsien	—N/a	
August 24, 2026	Shih Cheng-Ping	—N/a	
August 25, 2026	Randall Walko	—N/a	
August 27, 2026	Ma Chien-Hao	—N/a	

==== Additions ====
Date	Player	Contract terms	Former team	Ref.
August 18, 2026	Stanton Kidd	—N/a	(China) Changsha Yongsheng	

== Awards ==
=== Player of the Week ===
Week	Recipient	Award	Ref.
1	Lin Chun-Chi	Week 1 Player of the Week (local)	
1	Brandon Gilbeck	Week 1 Player of the Week (import)	
