= 2026–27 New Taipei CTBC DEA season =

Taiwanese professional basketball season

- President: Chen Kuo-En
- General Manager: Chen Hui
- Head Coach: Mathias Fischer
- Arena: Xinzhuang Gymnasium

TPBL results
- Record: 3–2 (60.0%)
- Place: TBD
- Playoffs finish: TBD

The 2026–27 New Taipei CTBC DEA season is the franchise's sixth season, its third season in the Taiwan Professional Basketball League (TPBL).

On June 2, 2026, the CTBC Sports Entertainment named Liu Chih-Wei as their full-time chief operating officer, and the DEA hired Chen Hui as their new general manager. On July 15, the DEA announced that Momir Ratković stepped down as the head coach. And the DEA hired Mathias Fischer as their new head coach.

== Draft ==
Round	Pick	Player	Position(s)	School / club team
1	3	Kuo Chia-An	Forward / center	NTSU
2	7	Ma Yo-Cheng	Guard	UT

- Reference：

On August 7, 2026, the first rounder, Kuo Chia-An had joined the Taiwan Beer of the Super Basketball League.

== Roster ==
New Taipei CTBC DEA roster
Players
Coaches

Pos.	No.	Nat.	Name	Ht.	Wt.	Age	From
F	0	(Taiwan)	Mohammad Al Bachir Gadiaga	1.89 m (6 ft 2 in)	92 kg (203 lb)	28 – 27 April 1998	SHU
F	1	(Taiwan)	Li Ruei-Ci	1.93 m (6 ft 4 in)	87 kg (192 lb)	33 – 7 January 1993	TSU
G	3	(United States) (Taiwan)	Walter Lum	1.75 m (5 ft 9 in)	75 kg (165 lb)	26 – 24 February 2000	Whitman
G	5	(Taiwan)	Yu Wei-Hao	1.74 m (5 ft 9 in)	70 kg (154 lb)	25 – 24 October 2001	NTUA
G	7	(Taiwan)	Wei Chia-Hao (injured) (C)	1.82 m (6 ft 0 in)	78 kg (172 lb)	26 – 13 January 2000	FJU
G	8	(Taiwan)	Ma Yo-Cheng	1.80 m (5 ft 11 in)	75 kg (165 lb)	23 – 8 October 2003	UT
G	10	(Taiwan)	Hsieh Ya-Hsuan	1.87 m (6 ft 2 in)	81 kg (179 lb)	28 – 30 October 1998	UCH
F	12	(Taiwan)	Lin Jen-Hung	1.94 m (6 ft 4 in)	85 kg (187 lb)	32 – 18 December 1993	NTNU
F	14	(Taiwan)	Tseng Hsin-Wu	1.95 m (6 ft 5 in)	90 kg (198 lb)	23 – 22 March 2003	NTNU
G	16	(Taiwan)	Lin Wei-Han	1.80 m (5 ft 11 in)	75 kg (165 lb)	36 – 9 July 1990	FJU
PF/C	17	(United States)	Marvin Jones (I)	2.13 m (7 ft 0 in)	105 kg (231 lb)	32 – 29 December 1993	Texas Southern
PF/C	20	(Slovakia)	Vladimír Brodziansky (injured) (I)	2.11 m (6 ft 11 in)	105 kg (231 lb)	32 – 8 May 1994	TCU
F	22	(Taiwan)	Huang Hung-Han	1.92 m (6 ft 4 in)	92 kg (203 lb)	32 – 15 October 1994	UCH
G	24	(Taiwan)	Jian Ting-Jhao	1.80 m (5 ft 11 in)	80 kg (176 lb)	28 – 16 January 1998	UCH
G/F	28	(Serbia)	Nemanja Nenadić (I)	1.97 m (6 ft 6 in)	88 kg (194 lb)	32 – 2 January 1994	Serbia
PF	61	(United States)	Clay Mounce (I)	2.00 m (6 ft 7 in)	98 kg (216 lb)	28 – 12 March 1998	Furman
C	76	(Taiwan)	Tseng Wen-Ting	2.04 m (6 ft 8 in)	98 kg (216 lb)	42 – 6 July 1984	TPEC
G	77	(Taiwan)	Li Pei-Cheng	1.81 m (5 ft 11 in)	79 kg (174 lb)	26 – 25 October 2000	FJU

Head coach

- (Germany) Mathias Fischer

Assistant coach(es)

- (Norway) Mathias Eckhoff
- (United States) (Republic of Ireland) Chris O'Shea

Strength & conditioning coach(es)

- (Taiwan) Chiang Cheng-Han
- (Taiwan) Wu Sheng-Han

Athletic trainer(s)

- (Taiwan) Fan Hsiang-Yu
- (Taiwan) Li Kuo-Yi

Team manager

- (Taiwan) Chen Hui

Legend

- (C) Team captain
- (I) Import player
- Injured

- Roster
- Transactions
Updated: November 22, 2026

== International friendship match ==
September 4, 2026

Seoul Samsung Thunders	70–77	New Taipei CTBC DEA

CTBC administration building basketball court, Taipei City

== Preseason ==
=== Game log ===
2026 preseason game log
Total: 1–1 (home: 1–1; road: 0–0)
Preseason : 1–1 (home: 1–1; road: 0–0)

Game	Date	Team	Score	High points	High rebounds	High assists	Location Attendance	Record
1	October 9	Aquas	W 136–133 (OT)	Hsieh Ya-Hsuan (27)	Vladimír Brodziansky (19)	Wei Chia-Hao (6); Mohammad Al Bachir Gadiaga (6)	Taipei Heping Basketball Gymnasium	1–0
2	October 10	Dreamers	L 92–97	Clay Mounce (28)	Vladimír Brodziansky (11)	Wei Chia-Hao (9)	Taipei Heping Basketball Gymnasium	1–1

Color： Win Lose
Schedule

== Regular season ==
=== Standings ===
Pos	Team	Pld	W	L	PCT	GB	Qualification
1	Kaohsiung Aquas	6	4	2	.667	—	Advance to semifinals
2	New Taipei Kings	5	3	2	.600	0.5	Advance to semifinals
3	New Taipei CTBC DEA	5	3	2	.600	0.5	Advance to semifinals
4	Taipei Taishin Mars	4	2	2	.500	1	Advance to play-in
5	Taoyuan Taiwan Beer Leopards	4	2	2	.500	1	Advance to play-in
6	Hsinchu Toplus Lioneers	3	1	2	.333	1.5	
7	Formosa Dreamers	5	1	4	.200	2.5	

Source: TPBL

=== Game log ===
2026–27 regular season game log
Total: 3–2 (home: 1–2; road: 2–0)
October : 0–1 (home: 0–1; road: 0–0)

Game	Date	Team	Score	High points	High rebounds	High assists	Location Attendance	Record
—	October 24	Mars	Postponed					
1	October 25	Kings	L 81–89	Vladimír Brodziansky (19)	Vladimír Brodziansky (15)	Wei Chia-Hao (6)	Xinzhuang Gymnasium; 4,146	0–1

November : 3–1 (home: 1–1; road: 2–0)

Game	Date	Team	Score	High points	High rebounds	High assists	Location Attendance	Record
2	November 1	@ Aquas	W 128–100	Mohammad Al Bachir Gadiaga (29)	Vladimír Brodziansky (9)	Vladimír Brodziansky (5)	Kaohsiung Arena; 5,875	1–1
3	November 14	Aquas	L 104–106	Vladimír Brodziansky (28)	Vladimír Brodziansky (16)	Wei Chia-Hao (11)	Xinzhuang Gymnasium; 4,282	1–2
4	November 15	Mars	W 94–87	Mohammad Al Bachir Gadiaga (26)	Vladimír Brodziansky (8)	Nemanja Nenadić (6); Tseng Wen-Ting (6)	Xinzhuang Gymnasium; 4,135	2–2
5	November 22	@ Dreamers	W 115–98	Marvin Jones (26)	Marvin Jones (12)	Mohammad Al Bachir Gadiaga (7); Lin Wei-Han (7)	Taichung Intercontinental Basketball Stadium; 2,104	3–2

December : 0–0 (home: 0–0; road: 0–0)

Game	Date	Team	Score	High points	High rebounds	High assists	Location Attendance	Record
6	December 4	@ Kings	0–0	()	()	()	Xinzhuang Gymnasium	–
7	December 6	@ Lioneers	0–0	()	()	()	Hsinchu County Stadium	–
8	December 12	Leopards	0–0	()	()	()	Xinzhuang Gymnasium	–
9	December 13	Aquas	0–0	()	()	()	Xinzhuang Gymnasium	–
10	December 25	@ Leopards	0–0	()	()	()	Taoyuan Arena	–
11	December 27	@ Mars	0–0	()	()	()	Taipei Heping Basketball Gymnasium	–

January : 0–0 (home: 0–0; road: 0–0)

Game	Date	Team	Score	High points	High rebounds	High assists	Location Attendance	Record
12	January 2	Dreamers	0–0	()	()	()	Xinzhuang Gymnasium	–
13	January 3	Lioneers	0–0	()	()	()	Xinzhuang Gymnasium	–
14	January 9	@ Dreamers	0–0	()	()	()	Taichung Intercontinental Basketball Stadium	–
15	January 23	@ Leopards	0–0	()	()	()	Taoyuan Arena	–
16	January 31	@ Kings	0–0	()	()	()	Xinzhuang Gymnasium	–

February : 0–0 (home: 0–0; road: 0–0)

Game	Date	Team	Score	High points	High rebounds	High assists	Location Attendance	Record
17	February 13	@ Aquas	0–0	()	()	()	Kaohsiung Arena	–
18	February 20	@ Lioneers	0–0	()	()	()	Hsinchu County Stadium	–
19	February 27	Leopards	0–0	()	()	()	Xinzhuang Gymnasium	–
20	February 28	Dreamers	0–0	()	()	()	Xinzhuang Gymnasium	–

March : 0–0 (home: 0–0; road: 0–0)

Game	Date	Team	Score	High points	High rebounds	High assists	Location Attendance	Record
21	March 6	@ Mars	0–0	()	()	()	Taipei Heping Basketball Gymnasium	–
22	March 13	@ Dreamers	0–0	()	()	()	Taichung Intercontinental Basketball Stadium	–
23	March 20	Kings	0–0	()	()	()		–
24	March 21	Leopards	0–0	()	()	()		–
25	March 26	Dreamers	0–0	()	()	()		–
26	March 28	@ Leopards	0–0	()	()	()	Taoyuan Arena	–

April : 0–0 (home: 0–0; road: 0–0)

Game	Date	Team	Score	High points	High rebounds	High assists	Location Attendance	Record
27	April 3	Lioneers	0–0	()	()	()		–
28	April 4	Mars	0–0	()	()	()		–
29	April 9	Aquas	0–0	()	()	()		–
30	April 11	@ Mars	0–0	()	()	()	Taipei Heping Basketball Gymnasium	–
31	April 17	@ Aquas	0–0	()	()	()	Kaohsiung Arena	–
32	April 25	@ Lioneers	0–0	()	()	()	Hsinchu County Stadium	–

May : 0–0 (home: 0–0; road: 0–0)

Game	Date	Team	Score	High points	High rebounds	High assists	Location Attendance	Record
33	May 1	@ Kings	0–0	()	()	()	Xinzhuang Gymnasium	–
34	May 15	Kings	0–0	()	()	()	Xinzhuang Gymnasium	–
35	May 16	Lioneers	0–0	()	()	()	Xinzhuang Gymnasium	–

Color： Win Lose Postponed
Schedule

=== Regular season note ===
- Due to the Typhoon Champi, the TPBL declared that the game on October 24 would be postponed.

== Player statistics ==
Legend
GP	Games played	MPG	Minutes per game	FG%	Field goal percentage
3P%	3-point field goal percentage	FT%	Free throw percentage	RPG	Rebounds per game
APG	Assists per game	SPG	Steals per game	BPG	Blocks per game
PPG	Points per game		Led the league

=== Regular season ===
Player	GP	MPG	PPG	FG%	3P%	FT%	RPG	APG	SPG	BPG
Mohammad Al Bachir Gadiaga										
Li Ruei-Ci										
Walter Lum										
Yu Wei-Hao										
Wei Chia-Hao										
Ma Yo-Cheng										
Hsieh Ya-Hsuan										
Lin Jen-Hung										
Tseng Hsin-Wu										
Lin Wei-Han										
Marvin Jones										
Vladimír Brodziansky										
Huang Hung-Han										
Jian Ting-Jhao										
Nemanja Nenadić										
Clay Mounce										
Tseng Wen-Ting										
Li Pei-Cheng										

- Reference：

== Transactions ==
=== Overview ===
Players added

Via draft

- Ma Yo-Cheng

Via free agency

- Bogdan Bliznyuk
- Vladimír Brodziansky
- Marvin Jones
- Clay Mounce
- Nemanja Nenadić
Players lost

Via free agency

- Beau Beech
- Viktor Gaddefors
- Nick King
- Nemanja Radović
- Marko Todorović

Voided

- Bogdan Bliznyuk

=== Free agency ===
==== Re-signed ====
Date	Player	Contract terms	Ref.
September 7, 2026	Lin Wei-Han	2-year contract, worth unknown	
September 7, 2026	Hsieh Ya-Hsuan	3-year extension contract, worth unknown	
September 7, 2026	Li Pei-Cheng	1-year contract, worth unknown	
September 7, 2026	Li Ruei-Ci	1-year contract, worth unknown	

==== Additions ====
Date	Player	Contract terms	Former team	Ref.
August 5, 2026	Marvin Jones	—N/a	(Philippines) Meralco Bolts	
August 13, 2026	Vladimír Brodziansky	—N/a	(China) Fujian Sturgeons	
August 19, 2026	Bogdan Bliznyuk	—N/a	(Taiwan) Kaohsiung Aquas	
August 20, 2026	Clay Mounce	—N/a	(Japan) Iwate Big Bulls	
September 7, 2026	Ma Yo-Cheng	—N/a	(Taiwan) UT	
September 29, 2026	Nemanja Nenadić	—N/a	(Turkey) Gaziantep Basketbol	

==== Subtractions ====
Date	Player	Reason	New team	Ref.
July 1, 2026	Nemanja Radović	Contract expired	(Japan) Ehime Orange Vikings	
July 28, 2026	Viktor Gaddefors	Contract expired	(Poland) Twarde Pierniki Toruń	
August 5, 2026	Marko Todorović	Contract expired	(Taiwan) Taipei Fubon Braves	
August 5, 2026	Beau Beech	Contract expired	(Poland) Zastal Zielona Góra	
August 5, 2026	Nick King	Contract expired	(Uruguay) Nacional	
September 29, 2026	Bogdan Bliznyuk	Contract voided	—N/a	

== Awards ==
=== Player of the Week ===
Week	Recipient	Award	Ref.
3	Mohammad Al Bachir Gadiaga	Week 3 Player of the Week (local)	
