= VTB United League Supercup MVP =

The VTB United League Supercup Most Valuable Player award is an annual award that is given to the most valuable player for Supercup of the Northeast European regional of the VTB United League, which is the 1st-tier professional basketball league of Russia. The award has been given since the 2021–22 VTB United League season.

== Winners ==
Key
Player (X)	Name of the player and number of times they had won the award at that point (if more than one)

VTB United League Supercup MVP Award Winners
Season	Player	Pos.	Nationality	Team	Ref(s)
2021–22	Will Clyburn	SF	United States	CSKA Moscow	
2022–23	Thomas Wimbush	SF	United States	Zenit Saint Petersburg	
2023–24	Kyle Kuric	SG	United States	Zenit Saint Petersburg	
2024–25	Aleksa Avramović	SG	Serbia	CSKA Moscow	
2025-2026	Melo Trimble	SG	United States	CSKA Moscow	

== Awards won by nationality ==
Country	Total
United States	3
Serbia	1

== Awards won by club ==
Country	Total
(Russia) CSKA Moscow	2
(Russia) Zenit Saint Petersburg	2
