= Rosco Allen =

Hungarian basketball player

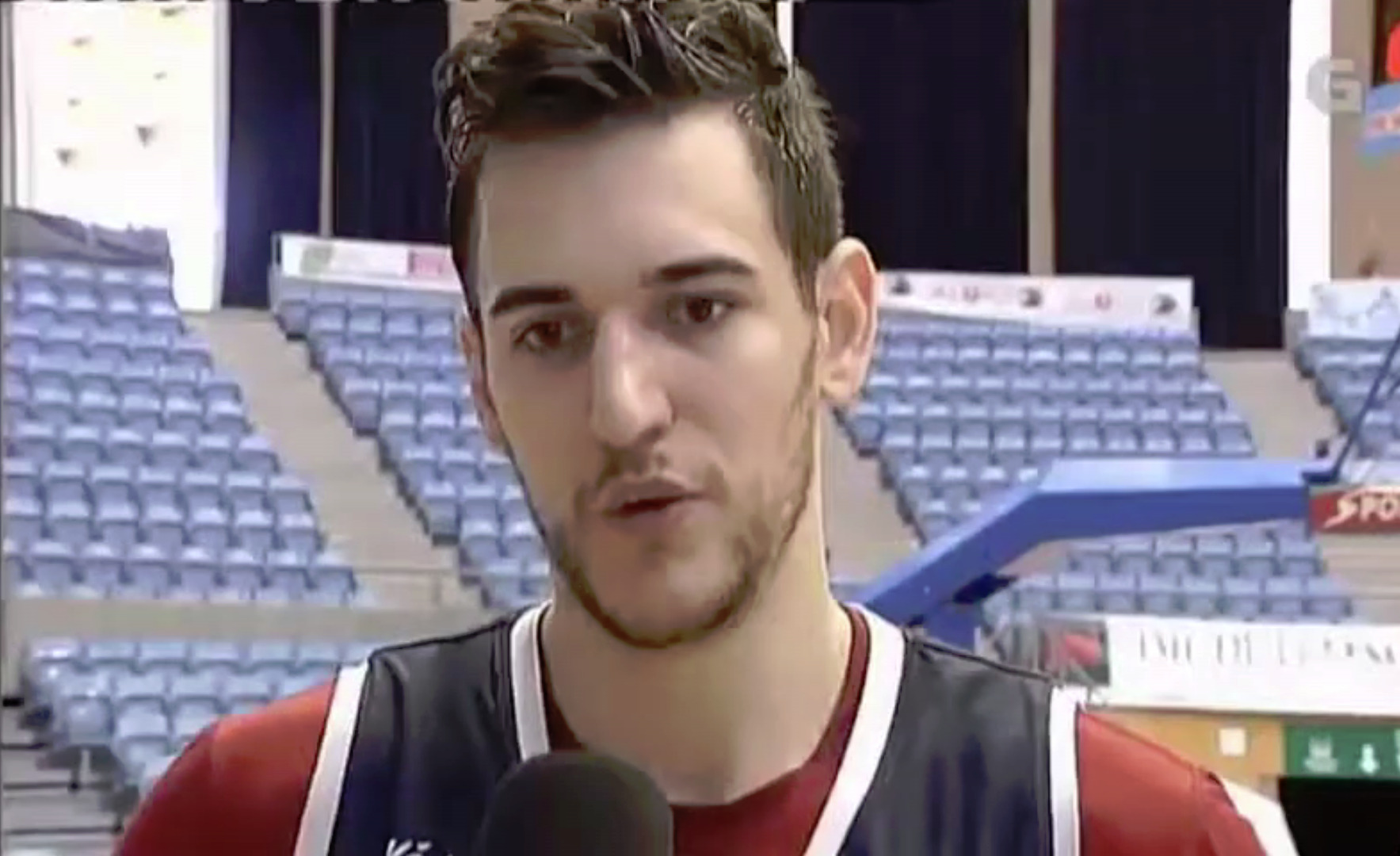

No. 25 – Kaohsiung Aquas
- Position: Small forward
- League: Taiwan Professional Basketball League

Personal information
- Born: May 5, 1993 (age 33) Budapest, Hungary
- Listed height: 6 ft 10 in (2.08 m)
- Listed weight: 220 lb (100 kg)

Career information
- High school: Bishop Gorman (Las Vegas, Nevada)
- College: Stanford (2012–2016)
- NBA draft: 2016: undrafted
- Playing career: 2016–present

Career history
- 2016–2017: Obradoiro
- 2017–2018: Iberostar Tenerife
- 2018–2019: Shimane Susanoo Magic
- 2019–2020: Gunma Crane Thunders
- 2020–2023: Niigata Albirex BB
- 2023–2026: Kawasaki Brave Thunders
- 2026–present: Kaohsiung Aquas

Career highlights
- FIBA Intercontinental Cup champion (2017); First-team All-Pac-12 (2016)

Rosco Allen (born May 5, 1993) is a Hungarian basketball player for the Kaohsiung Aquas of the Taiwan Professional Basketball League (TPBL). He played college basketball for the Stanford Cardinal.

== High school career ==
Allen emigrated to the United States from Hungary at age 12 and played high school basketball at Bishop Gorman High School in Las Vegas.

== College career ==
He chose Stanford and played for the Cardinal from 2012 to 2016. After earning first-team All-Pac-12 honors as a redshirt junior, Allen declared his eligibility for the 2016 NBA draft.

== Professional career ==
After going unselected in the draft, Allen played for the 2016 Golden State Warriors Summer League team and later signed with Obradoiro CAB in Spain.

Following the 2016–17 campaign, Allen signed with Tenerife.

Allen was a member of the 2018 Boston Celtics Summer League team.

For the 2018–2019 season, Allen signed with Shimane Susanoo Magic of the Japanese B.League.

Allen was a member of the 2019 Los Angeles Lakers Summer League team.

In 2019–2020, Allen signed with Gunma Crane Thunders of the Japanese B.League. He averaged 23.8 points, 8.1 rebounds, and 4.6 assists per game. On June 12, 2020, Allen signed with Niigata Albirex BB.

On July 28, 2026, Allen signed with the Kaohsiung Aquas of the Taiwan Professional Basketball League (TPBL).

Allen is a member of the men's Hungarian national basketball team.

== Personal life ==
He was born in Budapest, Hungary to an American father and a Hungarian mother. He has been married to Angelica Allen since June 2019.
