= Thomas Wimbush =

American basketball player (born 1993)

No. 20 – Taoyuan Taiwan Beer Leopards
- Position: Power forward
- League: Taiwan Professional Basketball League

Personal information
- Born: December 8, 1993 (age 32) Lorain, Ohio, United States
- Listed height: 201 cm (6 ft 7 in)
- Listed weight: 91 kg (201 lb)

Career information
- High school: Lorain (Lorain, Ohio)
- College: Fairmont State (2012–2017)
- NBA draft: 2017: undrafted
- Playing career: 2017–present

Career history
- 2017–2019: Long Island Nets
- 2019–2020: Riesen Ludwigsburg
- 2020–2021: Petkim Spor
- 2021–2022: Nanterre 92
- 2022–2023: Zenit Saint Petersburg
- 2023: Napoli Basket
- 2023–2024: Kawasaki Brave Thunders
- 2024–2025: Al-Ula
- 2025: Beirut Club
- 2025–2026: Shiga Lakes
- 2026–present: Taoyuan Taiwan Beer Leopards

Career highlights
- VTB United League Supercup winner (2022); VTB United League Supercup MVP (2022)

Thomas E'sean Shavez Wimbush II (born December 8, 1993) is an American basketball player for the Taoyuan Taiwan Beer Leopards of the Taiwan Professional Basketball League (TPBL).

== Professional career ==
After his college experience with the Fairmont State Falcons, Wimbush was drafted 4th overall in the 2017 NBA G League draft and he played in the NBA G League for two seasons with the Long Island Nets, averaging 9.9 points and 4 rebounds per game in the 2018-2019 season.

In the following season, Wimbush played in Germany in the Basketball Bundesliga with MHP Riesen Ludwigsburg, averaging 10.2 points and 3.1 rebounds per game.

He then moved to Turkey and played with Petkim Spor, averaging 10.5 points and 5.1 rebounds per game in the 2020-2021 season.

After his time in Turkey, Wimbush moved in France, where he played with Nanterre, in 2021-2022, closing the season averaging 13.5 points, 5.8 rebounds and 1.1 assists per game, also shooting with 51.7% from the field.

He then played the first part of the 2022-2023 season in Russia, playing in the VTB United League, with Zenit Saint Petersburg, averaging 7.2 points and 3.5 rebounds. He was also elected MVP of the VTB Supercup, won by Zenit in the final with CSKA Moscow, before being signed in Italy by the Napoli Basket of the Lega Basket Serie A on February 7, 2023.

On June 16, 2023, Wimbush signed with Kawasaki Brave Thunders of the B.League.

On August 23, 2024, Wimbush signed with Al-Ula of the Saudi Basketball League (SBL).

On July 21, 2025, Wimbush signed with Shiga Lakes of the B.League.

On August 10, 2026, Wimbush signed with the Taoyuan Taiwan Beer Leopards of the Taiwan Professional Basketball League (TPBL).
