= Gabriel Galvanini =

Brazilian basketball player (born 1998)

No. 52 – Kaohsiung Aquas
- Position: Power forward
- League: Taiwan Professional Basketball League

Personal information
- Born: September 11, 1998 (age 28) São Paulo, Brazil
- Listed height: 204 cm (6 ft 8 in)
- Listed weight: 100 kg (220 lb)

Career information
- NBA draft: 2020: undrafted
- Playing career: 2015–present

Career history
- 2015–2022: Bauru
- 2022–2024: Flamengo
- 2024–2026: Kolossos Rodou
- 2026: Peñarol
- 2026–present: Kaohsiung Aquas

Career highlights
- Uruguayan League champion (2026); NBB champion (2017); NBB Revelation Player (2018)

Gabriel Crepaldi Volpato Galvanini (born September 11, 1998) is a Brazilian professional basketball player for the Kaohsiung Aquas of the Taiwan Professional Basketball League (TPBL).

== Professional career ==
Galvanini started his professional career with Bauru Basket. On the São Paulo State's team, he stayed until 2022, being a valuable part of the team's rotation.

After 7 years with Bauru, Galvanini joined Flamengo of the top-tier Brazilian League. With Flamengo, he stayed for 2 years.

On July 15, 2024, he joined Kolossos Rodou of the Greek Basketball League, leaving Brazil for the first time in his career. After a successful first year with the club, he renewed his contract for one more year.

On July 30, 2026, Galvanini signed with the Kaohsiung Aquas of the Taiwan Professional Basketball League (TPBL).
