= Marin Marić =

Croatian basketball player

No. 34 – Taipei Taishin Mars
- Position: Center
- League: Taiwan Professional Basketball League

Personal information
- Born: 21 February 1994 (age 32) Split, Croatia
- Listed height: 211 cm (6 ft 11 in)
- Listed weight: 113 kg (249 lb)

Career information
- High school: La Lumiere School (La Porte, Indiana)
- College: Northern Illinois (2013–2017); DePaul (2017–2018)
- NBA draft: 2018: undrafted
- Playing career: 2011–present

Career history
- 2011–2012: Split
- 2018: Büyükçekmece
- 2018–2019: Oostende
- 2019–2020: Okapi Aalst
- 2020: BC Lietkabelis
- 2020–2021: Split
- 2021: Ironi Ness Ziona
- 2021–2022: Larisa
- 2022–2024: Andorra
- 2024: Changsha Wantian Yongsheng
- 2024–2025: Sichuan Blue Whales
- 2025: Al Riyadi Club Beirut
- 2025–2026: Shenzhen Leopards
- 2026: Hsinchu Toplus Lioneers
- 2026–present: Taipei Taishin Mars

Career highlights
- Belgian League champion (2019); 2× Third-team All-MAC (2016, 2017)
Medals
Men's basketball
Representing Croatia
FIBA U18 European Championship
Gold medal – first place	2012 Croatia	National team

Marin Marić (born 21 February 1994) is a Croatian professional basketball player for the Taipei Taishin Mars of the Taiwan Professional Basketball League (TPBL). He played college basketball in the United States for Northern Illinois and DePaul.

== Early life ==
Marić was born in Split, Croatia.

== College career ==
Marić moved to the United States in 2012 to attend La Lumiere School in La Porte, Indiana. In 2013, he enrolled at Northern Illinois University and debuted for the Huskies men's basketball. An injury early in his freshman year led to him redshirting the 2013–14 season. He returned in the 2014–15 season and played three full seasons for the Huskies. In 2017, he originally declared for the NBA draft, but withdrew his name before the draft withdrawal deadline. He subsequently left Northern Illinois and joined DePaul as a graduate transfer. In his lone season at DePaul, Maric averaged 13.6 points and 6.6 rebounds per game. He had a season-high 25 points, 11 rebounds and 5 assists against St. John's on 6 January 2018.

== Professional career ==
On 12 May 2012, Marić made his professional debut at age 18 with Split in an A-Liga game against Slavonski Brod, playing for 15 seconds.

Following the 2017–18 US college season, Marić had a two-game stint in the Turkish Basketball Super League for Büyükçekmece. For the 2018–19 season, he played in Belgium with Oostende of the Pro Basketball League (PBL). Despite him missing the back-end of the season with an elbow injury, he was crowned a champion in June 2019 when Oostende won the PBL title. He returned to Belgium for the 2019–20 season, joining Okapi Aalst. He was the PBL's MVP of Round 1 after recording 21 points and nine rebounds in a win over Leuven Bears. Marić led the league in rebounding with 8.8 rebounds per game.

On 19 June 2020, Marić signed with BC Lietkabelis of the Lithuanian Basketball League. He averaged 9.6 points and 5.6 rebounds in the EuroCup. On 3 December 2020, he signed with Split of the Adriatic League and the Croatian League, returning to the team for a second stint.

On 19 September 2021, Marić signed with Ironi Ness Ziona of the Israeli Basketball Super League. He left the team in early November.

On 16 December 2021, Marić signed with Larisa of the Greek Basket League. In 25 league games, he averaged 11.6 points, 6.8 rebounds and 1.5 assists, playing around 20 minutes per contest.

On 8 August 2022, Marić signed with MoraBanc Andorra of the LEB Oro. He averaged 10.4 points and 5.6 rebounds in 31 games during the 2022–23 season. He re-joined Andorra for the 2023–24 season, with the team now in the Liga ACB.

On 21 May 2024, Marić joined Changsha Wantian Yongsheng of the National Basketball League. On 30 September, he signed with Sichuan Blue Whales of the Chinese Basketball Association (CBA). In 43 games for Sichuan in 2024–25, he averaged 18.0 points, 10.7 rebounds, 3.3 assists and 1.2 steals per game.

In March 2025, Marić signed with Al Riyadi Club Beirut of the Lebanese Basketball League.

In November 2025, Marić signed with the Shenzhen Leopards for the 2025–26 CBA season. In 22 games, he averaged 5.1 points and 2.4 rebounds per game. On March 2, 2026, Marić signed with the Hsinchu Toplus Lioneers of the Taiwan Professional Basketball League (TPBL) for the rest of the 2025–26 season.

On August 20, 2026, Marić signed with the Taipei Taishin Mars of the TPBL for the 2026–27 season.

== National team career ==
Marić made his international debut in 2012 for the Croatian national under-18 team at the FIBA Europe Under-18 Championship, where he won a gold medal. In 2013, he played for the Croatian under-19 team at the FIBA Under-19 World Championship. In 2014, he played for the Croatian under-20 team at the FIBA Europe Under-20 Championship.

Marić played for the Croatian national senior team in 2020, 2021 and 2024.
