= Taipei Heping Basketball Gymnasium =

Indoor arena in Taipei, Taiwan

- Heping Basketball Court
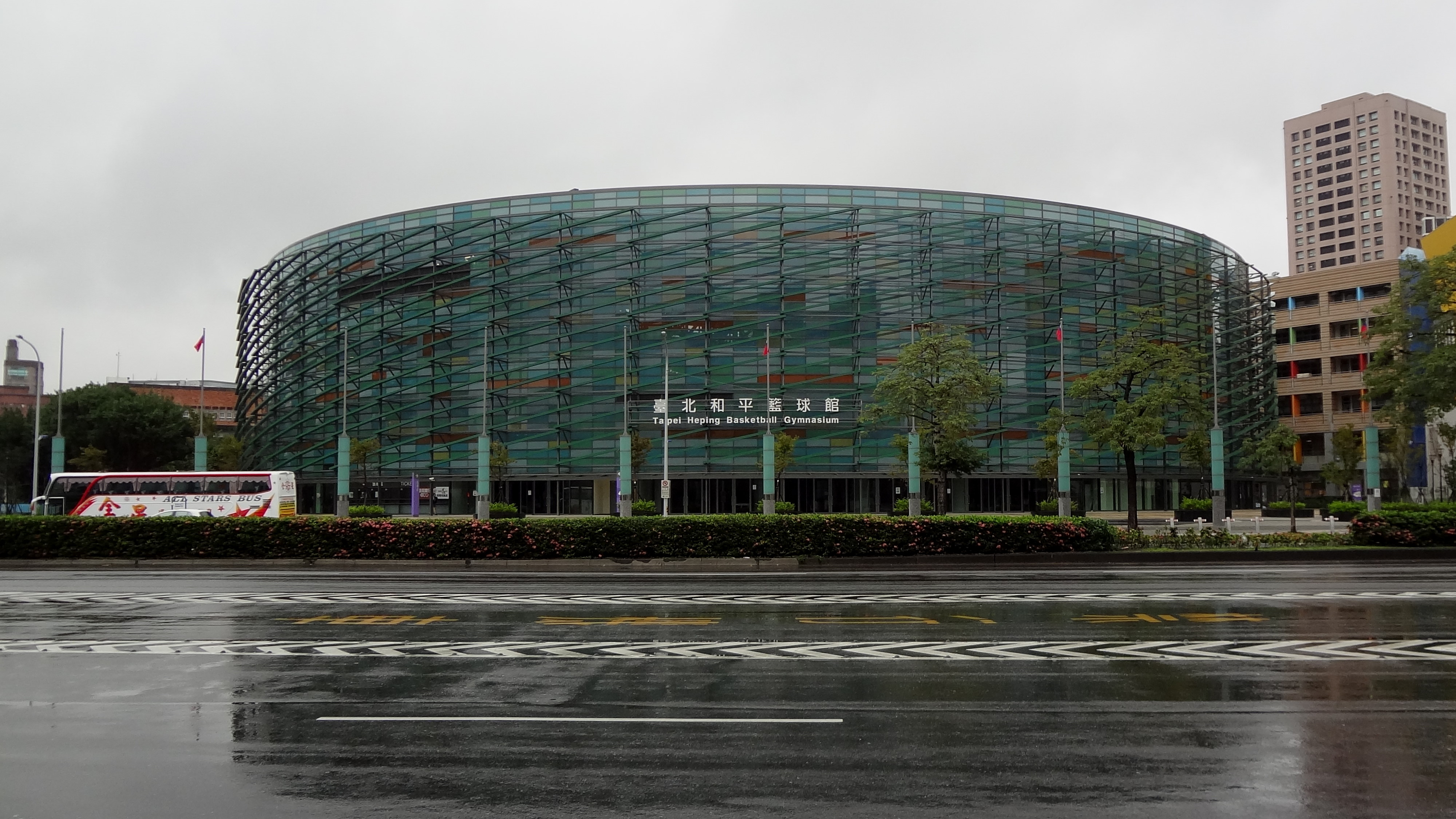
- Interactive map of Taipei Heping Basketball Gymnasium
- Address: No. 28, Ln. 76, Dunnan St.
- Location: Daan District, Taipei City
- Owner: Department of Education, Taipei City Government
- Operator: Chang Jia M&E Engineering Corp.
- Capacity: 7,000 (basketball)
- Type: Arena
- Public transit: Taipei Metro: Technology Building

Construction
- Opened: June 9, 2017

Tenants
- Taipei Fubon Braves (ABL/PLG) (2019–present); TaiwanBeer HeroBears (T1) (2022); Taoyuan Leopards (T1) (2022); Taipei Mars (T1) (2023–2024); Taipei Taishin Mars (TPBL) (2024–present); New Taipei CTBC DEA (TPBL) (2026); New Taipei Kings (TPBL) (2026)

Website
- www.tpehpbasketball.com.tw

Taipei Heping Basketball Gymnasium is an indoor arena in the Daan District, Taipei City. The building is primarily used as home venue for the Taipei Fubon Braves of the P. LEAGUE+ (PLG) and ASEAN Basketball League. Taipei Heping Basketball Gymnasium opened on June 8, 2017, and seats 7,000 fans for Braves games.

== Opening ==
The arena had its grand opening on June 8, 2017. The first game at the Taipei Heping Basketball Gymnasium took place on July 15, 2017, as the 2017 William Jones Cup. The Braves played their first regular season game there with a 92–71 win against the Kinmen Kaoliang Liquor on December 3, 2017.

== Accessibility ==
=== Transportation ===
Traffic congestion after events can cause delays for those who choose to drive to Taipei Heping Basketball Gymnasium. Visitors are encouraged to take Taipei Metro, the nearest station is Technology Building station.

=== Parking on-site ===
Taipei Heping Basketball Gymnasium features 537 parking spaces during Braves games (190 for vehicles, 347 for motorcycle).

== See also ==
- Taipei Fubon Braves
- TaiwanBeer HeroBears
- Taoyuan Leopards
- Taipei Mars / Taipei Taishin Mars
- New Taipei CTBC DEA
- New Taipei Kings
