= Taoyuan Arena =

Indoor sporting arena in Taoyuan City, Taiwan

- Interactive map of Taoyuan Arena
- Address: No. 1, Sanmin Rd. Sec. 1, Taoyuan Dist., Taoyuan City
- Location: Taoyuan City, Taiwan
- Coordinates: 24°59′42″N 121°19′22″E
- Owner: Taoyuan City Government
- Capacity: 8,700
- Field size: 1.5 ha (160,000 sq ft)

Construction
- Groundbreaking: 1991
- Opened: September, 1993
- Renovated: 2019–2020
- Architects: H.C. Chen Architects & Associates

Tenants
- Taoyuan Pauian Pilots (PLG, EASL) (2020–present); Taoyuan Taiwan Beer Leopards (T1, TPBL) (2022–present)

The Taoyuan Arena (Chinese: 桃園市立體育館; pinyin: Táoyuán Xiàn Lì Tǐyùguǎn) is an indoor sporting arena located in Taoyuan City, Taoyuan County, Taiwan. The capacity of the arena is 8,700 and was opened in 1993. It is used to host indoor sporting events, such as basketball and volleyball.

== See also ==
- List of stadiums in Taiwan
