= 2024–25 TPBL regular season =

1st TPBL regular season

Taiwan Professional Basketball League
- Season: 2024–25
- Duration: October 19, 2024 – May 18, 2025
- Games played: 36 per team
- Teams: 7

Regular season
- Season MVP: Jeremy Lin (Kings)

Statistical leaders
| Points | Lasan Kromah (Leopards) | 23.3 |
| Rebounds | Devin Williams (Leopards) | 12.7 |
| Assists | Gao Jin-Wei (Leopards) | 6.4 |

Records
- Biggest home win: DEA 76–121 Kings (May 3, 2025)
- Biggest away win: Kings 111–79 DEA (April 20, 2025)
- Highest scoring: Dreamers 123–107 Mars (December 15, 2024)
- Lowest scoring: Kings 79–61 DEA (November 27, 2024)
- Winning streak: 8 games Kings
- Losing streak: 5 games Lioneers (2 times); Mars; Leopards
- All statistics correct as of May 18, 2025.

The 2024–25 TPBL regular season was the first regular season of Taiwan Professional Basketball League. Participating teams included the Formosa Dreamers, Hsinchu Toplus Lioneers, Kaohsiung Aquas, New Taipei CTBC DEA, New Taipei Kings, Taipei Taishin Mars, and the Taoyuan Taiwan Beer Leopards. Each team played against another six times, three at home and three on the road, respectively, led to 36 matches in total. The regular season started on October 19, 2024, and ended on May 18, 2025. The 2024–25 season opening game, matched by the New Taipei CTBC DEA and the Formosa Dreamers, was played at Taichung Intercontinental Basketball Stadium.

== League table ==
| Pos | Team | Pld | W | L | PCT | GB | Qualification |
|---|---|---|---|---|---|---|---|
| 1 | New Taipei Kings | 36 | 26 | 10 | .722 | — | Advance to semifinals |
| 2 | Formosa Dreamers | 36 | 21 | 15 | .583 | 5 | Advance to semifinals |
| 3 | Kaohsiung Aquas | 36 | 19 | 17 | .528 | 7 | Advance to semifinals |
| 4 | Taipei Taishin Mars | 36 | 16 | 20 | .444 | 10 | Advance to play-in |
| 5 | Taoyuan Taiwan Beer Leopards | 36 | 16 | 20 | .444 | 10 | Advance to play-in |
| 6 | New Taipei CTBC DEA | 36 | 16 | 20 | .444 | 10 | |
| 7 | Hsinchu Toplus Lioneers | 36 | 12 | 24 | .333 | 14 | |

Source: TPBL

=== Head to head ===
| Home \ Away | MARS | DEA | KINGS | LEOPARDS | LIONEERS | DREAMERS | AQUAS |
|---|---|---|---|---|---|---|---|
| Taipei Taishin Mars | — | 3–0 | 2–1 | 2–1 | 2–1 | 1–2 | 1–2 |
| New Taipei CTBC DEA | 2–1 | — | 0–3 | 1–2 | 2–1 | 1–2 | 2–1 |
| New Taipei Kings | 3–0 | 2–1 | — | 2–1 | 3–0 | 2–1 | 3–0 |
| Taoyuan Taiwan Beer Leopards | 1–2 | 1–2 | 1–2 | — | 3–0 | 2–1 | 1–2 |
| Hsinchu Toplus Lioneers | 2–1 | 0–3 | 0–3 | 2–1 | — | 3–0 | 3–0 |
| Formosa Dreamers | 2–1 | 2–1 | 3–0 | 1–2 | 3–0 | — | 3–0 |
| Kaohsiung Aquas | 3–0 | 2–1 | 1–2 | 3–0 | 3–0 | 2–1 | — |

Source: TPBL
Legend: Blue = home team win; Red = away team win.
Matches with lighter background shading were decided after overtime.

== Matches ==
=== Matchweek 1 (opening match) ===
| October 19, 2024 Regular #001 | New Taipei CTBC DEA | 74–88 | Formosa Dreamers | Taichung City |
| 14:30 (UTC+8) | Scoring by quarter: 18–21, 22–21, 16–23, 18–23 |
| | Pts: Shih Chin-Yao, Goodwin 16; Rebs: Thornton 17; Asts: three players 3 | boxscore | Pts: Lin Chun-Chi 22; Rebs: Holman 18; Asts: Lin Chun-Chi 6 | Arena: Taichung Intercontinental Basketball Stadium; Attendance: 3,000; Referees: Yeh Chun-Hung, Lai Chien-Hao, Tsung Hsiu-Hui |

| October 19, 2024 Regular #002 | New Taipei Kings | 88–78 | Kaohsiung Aquas | Kaohsiung City |
| 17:00 (UTC+8) | Scoring by quarter: 19–17, 24–24, 25–21, 20–16 |
| | Pts: Je. Lin 34; Rebs: Washburn, Manigault 9 Asts: Je. Lin 4 | boxscore | Pts: Wesson 20; Rebs: Hu Long-Mao, Wesson 9 Asts: Brickman 11 | Arena: Kaohsiung Arena; Attendance: 8,156; Referees: Chen Chao-Hung, Yang Shih-Hsien, Hsieh Shang-Chien |

| October 20, 2024 Regular #003 | Taipei Taishin Mars | 85–105 | Formosa Dreamers | Taichung City |
| 14:30 (UTC+8) | Scoring by quarter: 25–31, 25–32, 11–23, 24–19 |
| | Pts: Oliver 23; Rebs: Miller, Oliver 7 Asts: Tsao Xun-Xiang 7 | boxscore | Pts: Lin Chun-Chi 20; Rebs: Janković 11; Asts: Lin Chun-Chi 7 | Arena: Taichung Intercontinental Basketball Stadium; Attendance: 3,000; Referees: Lin Chien-Hung, Huang Chen-Feng, Lo Kuo-Hsien |

| October 20, 2024 Regular #004 | Hsinchu Toplus Lioneers | 79–93 | Kaohsiung Aquas | Kaohsiung City |
| 17:00 (UTC+8) | Scoring by quarter: 17–22, 19–21, 25–31, 18–19 |
| | Pts: Clark 20; Rebs: Meeks 9 Asts: Kao Kuo-Hao, Tseng Po-Yu 3 | boxscore | Pts: Wesson 26; Rebs: Wesson 13; Asts: Chen Huai-An 8 | Arena: Kaohsiung Arena; Attendance: 4,164; Referees: Chen Hung-Ming, Peng Shih-Hsuan, Wu Fang-Shan |

=== Matchweek 2 ===
| October 26, 2024 Regular #005 | Taipei Taishin Mars | 71–88 | Kaohsiung Aquas | Kaohsiung City |
| 14:30 (UTC+8) | Scoring by quarter: 22–16, 18–21, 13–32, 18–19 |
| | Pts: Miller 20; Rebs: Oliver 9 Asts: Ting Sheng-Ju 7 | boxscore | Pts: Wesson 15; Rebs: Wesson 10; Asts: Brickman 8 | Arena: Kaohsiung Arena; Attendance: 3,619; Referees: Yeh Chun-Hung, Lo Kuo-Hsien, Chen Chien-Lin |

| October 26, 2024 Regular #006 | Hsinchu Toplus Lioneers | 93–122 | New Taipei Kings | New Taipei City |
| 17:00 (UTC+8) | Scoring by quarter: 32–31, 16–38, 26–28, 19–25 |
| | Pts: Clark 28; Rebs: Meeks 11; Asts: Kao Kuo-Hao 6 | boxscore | Pts: Jo. Lin 24; Rebs: Daye 8 Asts: Je. Lin 9 | Arena: Xinzhuang Gymnasium; Attendance: 3,581; Referees: Hsieh Wen-Wei, Lai Chien-Hao, Huang Po-Wei |

| October 27, 2024 Regular #007 | Taoyuan Taiwan Beer Leopards | 87–88 | Kaohsiung Aquas | Kaohsiung City |
| 14:30 (UTC+8) | Scoring by quarter: 29–16, 16–25, 14–21, 28–26 |
| | Pts: Kromah 29; Rebs: Williams 10; Asts: Gao Jin-Wei 6 | boxscore | Pts: Wesson 19; Rebs: Wesson 12; Asts: Chen Huai-An 9 | Arena: Kaohsiung Arena; Attendance: 3,588; Referees: Lin Chien-Hung, Sung Ming-Lu, Tsung Hsiu-Hui |

| October 27, 2024 Regular #008 | New Taipei CTBC DEA | 99–98 | New Taipei Kings | New Taipei City |
| 17:00 (UTC+8) | Scoring by quarter: 27–21, 17–29, 38–25, 17–23 |
| | Pts: Griffin 26; Rebs: Griffin 15; Asts: Hsieh Ya-Hsuan 5 | boxscore | Pts: Johnson 20; Rebs: Johnson 18; Asts: Jo. Lin 8 | Arena: Xinzhuang Gymnasium; Attendance: 3,568; Referees: Chen Hung-Ming, Huang Chen-Feng, Peng Shih-Hsuan |

=== Matchweek 3 ===
| October 30, 2024 Regular #009 | Formosa Dreamers | 81–88 | New Taipei Kings | New Taipei City |
| 19:00 (UTC+8) | Scoring by quarter: 24–23, 21–20, 20–15, 16–30 |
| | Pts: Beech 19; Rebs: Holman 10; Asts: Gilbeck 5 | boxscore | Pts: Je. Lin 26; Rebs: Manigault 14; Asts: Jo. Lin 7 | Arena: Xinzhuang Gymnasium; Attendance: 3,261; Referees: Lin Chien-Hung, Yang Shih-Hsien, Hsieh Shang-Chien |

| November 2, 2024 Regular #010 | Kaohsiung Aquas | 97–107 | New Taipei CTBC DEA | New Taipei City |
| 14:30 (UTC+8) | Scoring by quarter: 26–26, 33–19, 10–33, 28–29 |
| | Pts: Morse 23; Rebs: Morse 15; Asts: Brickman 12 | boxscore | Pts: Eads 28; Rebs: Goodwin 16; Asts: Eads 6 | Arena: Xinzhuang Gymnasium; Attendance: 4,979; Referees: Lai Chien-Hao, Huang Chen-Feng, Lan Wei-Hsiung |

| November 2, 2024 Regular #011 | Hsinchu Toplus Lioneers | 79–76 | Taipei Taishin Mars | Taipei City |
| 17:00 (UTC+8) | Scoring by quarter: 31–11, 8–23, 26–28, 14–14 |
| | Pts: Clark 22; Rebs: Holyfield 14; Asts: Kao Kuo-Hao 6 | boxscore | Pts: Ting Sheng-Ju 16; Rebs: Oliver 13; Asts: Ting Sheng-Ju, Tsao Xun-Xiang 4 | Arena: Taipei Heping Basketball Gymnasium; Attendance: 4,219; Referees: Chen Hung-Ming, Sung Ming-Lu, Tsung Hsiu-Hui |

| November 3, 2024 Regular #012 | Formosa Dreamers | 89–82 | New Taipei CTBC DEA | New Taipei City |
| 14:30 (UTC+8) | Scoring by quarter: 30–26, 19–15, 20–18, 20–23 |
| | Pts: Holman 23; Rebs: Gilbeck 15; Asts: Holman 5 | boxscore | Pts: Eads 19; Rebs: Goodwin 17; Asts: Wei Chia-Hao, Hsieh Ya-Hsuan 3 | Arena: Xinzhuang Gymnasium; Attendance: 5,341; Referees: Chen Hung-Ming, Lo Kuo-Hsien, Chen Chien-Lin |

| November 3, 2024 Regular #013 | Taoyuan Taiwan Beer Leopards | 82–78 | Taipei Taishin Mars | Taipei City |
| 17:00 (UTC+8) | Scoring by quarter: 21–19, 9–21, 18–21, 34–17 |
| | Pts: Gao Jin-Wei, Lin Sin-Kuan 19; Rebs: Williams 13; Asts: Gao Jin-Wei 8 | boxscore | Pts: Oliver 22; Rebs: Oliver 12; Asts: Ting Sheng-Ju 8 | Arena: Taipei Heping Basketball Gymnasium; Attendance: 3,259; Referees: Yeh Chun-Hung, Hsieh Shang-Chien, Wu Fang-Shan |

=== Matchweek 4 ===
| November 9, 2024 Regular #014 | Kaohsiung Aquas | 90–99 | Formosa Dreamers | Taichung City |
| 14:30 (UTC+8) | Scoring by quarter: 19–15, 20–24, 27–32, 24–28 |
| | Pts: Wesson 27; Rebs: Wesson 17; Asts: Brickman 11 | boxscore | Pts: Ma Chien-Hao 21; Rebs: Holman 10; Asts: Ma Chien-Hao 5 | Arena: Taichung Intercontinental Basketball Stadium; Attendance: 3,000; Referees: Yeh Chun-Hung, Huang Po-Wei, Hsu Wei-Kai |

| November 9, 2024 Regular #015 | Taoyuan Taiwan Beer Leopards | 73–99 | Hsinchu Toplus Lioneers | Hsinchu County |
| 17:00 (UTC+8) | Scoring by quarter: 19–31, 14–16, 20–29, 20–23 |
| | Pts: Kromah 21; Rebs: Williams 17; Asts: Gao Jin-Wei 8 | boxscore | Pts: Clark 25; Rebs: Holyfield 15; Asts: Kao Kuo-Hao 9 | Arena: Hsinchu County Stadium; Attendance: 5,721; Referees: Chen Hung-Ming, Huang Chen-Feng, Chen Ching-Hsiang |

| November 10, 2024 Regular #016 | New Taipei Kings | 76–87 | Formosa Dreamers | Taichung City |
| 14:30 (UTC+8) | Scoring by quarter: 17–20, 17–28, 23–20, 19–19 |
| | Pts: Jo. Lin 21; Rebs: Je. Lin, Manigault 11; Asts: Je. Lin 7 | boxscore | Pts: Beech, Holman 18; Rebs: Holman 18; Asts: Beech, Ma Chien-Hao 3 | Arena: Taichung Intercontinental Basketball Stadium; Attendance: 3,000; Referees: Sung Ming-Lu, Lai Chien-Hao, Ou Yang Yu-Hsien |

| November 10, 2024 Regular #017 | Taipei Taishin Mars | 94–84 | Hsinchu Toplus Lioneers | Hsinchu County |
| 17:00 (UTC+8) | Scoring by quarter: 22–24, 19–24, 26–18, 27–18 |
| | Pts: Zaytsev, Miller 19; Rebs: three players 11; Asts: Ting Sheng-Ju 12 | boxscore | Pts: Clark 22; Rebs: Holyfield 9 Asts: four players 3 | Arena: Hsinchu County Stadium; Attendance: 5,433; Referees: Lin Chien-Hung, Lo Kuo-Hsien, Huang Shao-Po |

=== Matchweek 5 ===
| November 27, 2024 Regular #018 | New Taipei Kings | 79–61 | New Taipei CTBC DEA | New Taipei City |
| 19:00 (UTC+8) | Scoring by quarter: 21–12, 18–14, 19–17, 21–18 |
| | Pts: Washburn 25; Rebs: Washburn 19; Asts: Je. Lin 7 | boxscore | Pts: Frankamp 15; Rebs: Griffin 16; Asts: Huang Hung-Han, Wei Chia-Hao 4 | Arena: Xinzhuang Gymnasium; Attendance: 3,756; Referees: Lan Wei-Hsiung, Huang Chen-Feng, Tsung Hsiu-Hui |

| November 30, 2024 Regular #019 | Formosa Dreamers | 90–92 | Taoyuan Taiwan Beer Leopards | Taoyuan City |
| 14:30 (UTC+8) | Scoring by quarter: 15–22, 22–21, 21–24, 32–25 |
| | Pts: Beech 24; Rebs: Beech 16; Asts: Lu Kuan-Liang, Lin Chun-Chi 3 | boxscore | Pts: Kromah 25; Rebs: Williams 12; Asts: Gao Jin-Wei 5 | Arena: Taoyuan Arena; Attendance: 5,205; Referees: Hsieh Wen-Wei, Huang Po-Wei, Huang Shao-Po |

| November 30, 2024 Regular #020 | Hsinchu Toplus Lioneers | 84–85 | New Taipei CTBC DEA | New Taipei City |
| 17:00 (UTC+8) | Scoring by quarter: 23–20, 31–21, 17–27, 13–17 |
| | Pts: Clark 28; Rebs: Clark 12; Asts: Kao Kuo-Hao 6 | boxscore | Pts: Griffin, Krajina 17; Rebs: Huang Hung-Han, Griffin 9 Asts: Tseng Wen-Ting 8 | Arena: Xinzhuang Gymnasium; Attendance: 5,195; Referees: Yeh Chun-Hung, Hsieh Shang-Chien, Peng Shih-Hsuan |

| December 1, 2024 Regular #021 | Kaohsiung Aquas | 106–94(OT) | Taoyuan Taiwan Beer Leopards | Taoyuan City |
| 14:30 (UTC+8) | Scoring by quarter: 26–29, 28–16, 16–18, 19–26, Overtime: 17–5 |
| | Pts: Wesson 31; Rebs: Wesson 13; Asts: Morse, Su Wen-Ju 6 | boxscore | Pts: Gao Jin-Wei 24; Rebs: Williams 12; Asts: Kromah 8 | Arena: Taoyuan Arena; Attendance: 4,227; Referees: Chen Chao-Hung, Lai Chien-Hao, Ou Yang Yu-Hsien |

| December 1, 2024 Regular #022 | Taipei Taishin Mars | 85–76 | New Taipei CTBC DEA | New Taipei City |
| 17:00 (UTC+8) | Scoring by quarter: 14–16, 24–23, 23–20, 24–17 |
| | Pts: McCallum 23; Rebs: Eric 13; Asts: McCallum 7 | boxscore | Pts: Krajina 21; Rebs: Thornton 13; Asts: Shih Chin-Yao 6 | Arena: Xinzhuang Gymnasium; Attendance: 3,441; Referees: Chen Hung-Ming, Lin Chien-Hung, Chen Ching-Hsiang |

=== Matchweek 6 ===
| December 4, 2024 Regular #023 | Hsinchu Toplus Lioneers | 89–112 | Taoyuan Taiwan Beer Leopards | Taoyuan City |
| 19:00 (UTC+8) | Scoring by quarter: 24–24, 19–30, 27–27, 19–31 |
| | Pts: Clark 21; Rebs: Li Han-Sheng, Holyfield 6 Asts: Lu Kuan-Hsuan, Kao Kuo-Hao 6 | boxscore | Pts: Kromah 34; Rebs: Williams 11; Asts: Kromah 7 | Arena: Taoyuan Arena; Attendance: 2,138; Referees: Lin Chien-Hung, Lan Wei-Hsiung, Yang Shih-Hsien |

| December 7, 2024 Regular #024 | Hsinchu Toplus Lioneers | 78–96 | New Taipei Kings | New Taipei City |
| 14:30 (UTC+8) | Scoring by quarter: 14–28, 23–18, 24–34, 17–16 |
| | Pts: Meeks 15; Rebs: Clark 14; Asts: Kao Kuo-Hao 5 | boxscore | Pts: Washburn 17; Rebs: Johnson 14; Asts: Je. Lin 8 | Arena: Xinzhuang Gymnasium; Attendance: 4,349; Referees: Chen Chao-Hung, Chen Chien-Lin, Huang Po-Wei |

| December 7, 2024 Regular #025 | New Taipei CTBC DEA | 87–86(OT) | Taoyuan Taiwan Beer Leopards | Taoyuan City |
| 17:00 (UTC+8) | Scoring by quarter: 25–21, 13–17, 28–26, 13–15, Overtime: 8–7 |
| | Pts: Krajina 22; Rebs: Krajina 14; Asts: Hsieh Ya-Hsuan, Frankamp 5 | boxscore | Pts: Gao Jin-Wei 24; Rebs: Williams 23; Asts: Gao Jin-Wei 7 | Arena: Taoyuan Arena; Attendance: 5,041; Referees: Sung Ming-Lu, Lo Kuo-Hsien, Wu Fang-Shan |

| December 8, 2024 Regular #026 | Formosa Dreamers | 89–121 | New Taipei Kings | New Taipei City |
| 14:30 (UTC+8) | Scoring by quarter: 25–31, 19–31, 18–32, 27–27 |
| | Pts: Ma Chien-Hao 18; Rebs: Gilbeck 12; Asts: Lin Chun-Chi 4 | boxscore | Pts: Washburn 24; Rebs: Daye, Manigault 8 Asts: Je. Lin 8 | Arena: Xinzhuang Gymnasium; Attendance: 5,255; Referees: Chen Hung-Ming, Peng Shih-Hsuan, Hsieh Shang-Chien |

| December 8, 2024 Regular #027 | Taipei Taishin Mars | 95–74 | Taoyuan Taiwan Beer Leopards | Taoyuan City |
| 17:00 (UTC+8) | Scoring by quarter: 35–16, 29–16, 8–25, 23–17 |
| | Pts: Eric 23; Rebs: Eric 11; Asts: McCallum 13 | boxscore | Pts: Gao Jin-Wei, Williams 18; Rebs: Williams 15; Asts: Gao Jin-Wei 5 | Arena: Taoyuan Arena; Attendance: 4,678; Referees: Yu Jung, Huang Chen-Feng, Hsu Wei-Kai |

=== Matchweek 7 ===
| December 11, 2024 Regular #028 | New Taipei CTBC DEA | 80–92 | Formosa Dreamers | Taichung City |
| 19:00 (UTC+8) | Scoring by quarter: 20–24, 15–22, 19–13, 26–33 |
| | Pts: Krajina 19; Rebs: Thornton 14; Asts: three players 5 | boxscore | Pts: Ma Chien-Hao 15; Rebs: Gilbeck, Holman 14; Asts: Holman 5 | Arena: Taichung Intercontinental Basketball Stadium; Attendance: 2,383; Referees: Yu Jung, Chen Chien-Lin, Hsu Wei-Kai |

| December 13, 2024 Regular #029 | Hsinchu Toplus Lioneers | 81–96 | Formosa Dreamers | Taichung City |
| 19:00 (UTC+8) | Scoring by quarter: 26–28, 23–25, 11–29, 21–14 |
| | Pts: Clark 22; Rebs: Clark 12; Asts: Lu Kuan-Hsuan 5 | boxscore | Pts: Beech 24; Rebs: Gilbeck, Holman 9 Asts: Wu Chia-Chun 8 | Arena: Taichung Intercontinental Basketball Stadium; Attendance: 2,618; Referees: Lo Kuo-Hsien, Lai Chien-Hao, Hsieh Shang-Chien |

| December 14, 2024 Regular #030 | Taoyuan Taiwan Beer Leopards | 87–95 | Kaohsiung Aquas | Kaohsiung City |
| 14:30 (UTC+8) | Scoring by quarter: 23–18, 21–26, 24–21, 19–30 |
| | Pts: Kromah, Williams 19; Rebs: Williams 15; Asts: Gao Jin-Wei 9 | boxscore | Pts: Su Wen-Ju 22; Rebs: Wesson 15; Asts: Chen Huai-An 6 | Arena: Kaohsiung Arena; Attendance: 4,062; Referees: Chen Hung-Ming, Hsieh Shang-Chien, Peng Shih-Hsuan |

| December 14, 2024 Regular #031 | New Taipei CTBC DEA | 91–98 | Taipei Taishin Mars | Taipei City |
| 17:00 (UTC+8) | Scoring by quarter: 24–25, 28–32, 20–21, 19–20 |
| | Pts: Hsieh Ya-Hsuan 32; Rebs: Thornton 10; Asts: Wei Chia-Hao 5 | boxscore | Pts: Eric 20; Rebs: Eric 15; Asts: McCallum 14 | Arena: Taipei Heping Basketball Gymnasium; Attendance: 4,027; Referees: Chen Chao-Hung, Lan Wei-Hsiung, Yang Shih-Hsien |

| December 15, 2024 Regular #032 | New Taipei Kings | 107–78 | Kaohsiung Aquas | Kaohsiung City |
| 14:30 (UTC+8) | Scoring by quarter: 26–22, 35–19, 27–20, 19–17 |
| | Pts: Johnson 22; Rebs: Johnson 11; Asts: Lee Kai-Yan 5 | boxscore | Pts: Želionis 17; Rebs: Morse, Chen Huai-An 7 Asts: Chen Huai-An 6 | Arena: Kaohsiung Arena; Attendance: 9,223; Referees: Lin Chien-Hung, Lai Chien-Hao, Wu Fang-Shan |

| December 15, 2024 Regular #033 | Formosa Dreamers | 123–107 | Taipei Taishin Mars | Taipei City |
| 17:00 (UTC+8) | Scoring by quarter: 31–30, 23–23, 31–27, 38–27 |
| | Pts: Ma Chien-Hao 26; Rebs: Gilbeck 11; Asts: Wu Chia-Chun 6 | boxscore | Pts: Robinson 23; Rebs: Eric 10; Asts: Ting Sheng-Ju 9 | Arena: Taipei Heping Basketball Gymnasium; Attendance: 3,897; Referees: Hsieh Wen-Wei, Huang Chen-Feng, Wu Fang-Shan |

=== Matchweek 8 ===
| December 18, 2024 Regular #034 | Taipei Taishin Mars | 94–102 | Kaohsiung Aquas | Kaohsiung City |
| 19:00 (UTC+8) | Scoring by quarter: 23–26, 22–38, 27–20, 22–18 |
| | Pts: Eric 20; Rebs: Robinson 14; Asts: Ting Sheng-Ju 5 | boxscore | Pts: Morse 25; Rebs: Želionis 17; Asts: Chen Huai-An 11 | Arena: Kaohsiung Arena; Attendance: 2,371; Referees: Yeh Chun-Hung, Sung Ming-Lu, Chen Chien-Lin |

| December 20, 2024 Regular #035 | Taoyuan Taiwan Beer Leopards | 95–105 | Kaohsiung Aquas | Kaohsiung City |
| 19:00 (UTC+8) | Scoring by quarter: 22–27, 19–30, 29–25, 25–23 |
| | Pts: Kromah 29; Rebs: Williams 10; Asts: Kromah 7 | boxscore | Pts: Želionis 24; Rebs: Želionis 13; Asts: Chen Huai-An 14 | Arena: Kaohsiung Arena; Attendance: 2,912; Referees: Chen Chao-Hung, Yang Shih-Hsien, Chen Ching-Hsiang |

| December 21, 2024 Regular #036 | New Taipei Kings | 102–89 | Taipei Taishin Mars | Taipei City |
| 14:30 (UTC+8) | Scoring by quarter: 25–20, 25–28, 29–14, 23–27 |
| | Pts: Johnson 27; Rebs: Manigault 9 Asts: Je. Lin 9 | boxscore | Pts: Robinson 23; Rebs: Eric 12; Asts: Tsao Xun-Xiang 7 | Arena: Taipei Heping Basketball Gymnasium; Attendance: 4,668; Referees: Chen Hung-Ming, Tsung Hsiu-Hui, Lo Kuo-Hsien |

| December 21, 2024 Regular #037 | Hsinchu Toplus Lioneers | 93–78 | New Taipei CTBC DEA | New Taipei City |
| 17:00 (UTC+8) | Scoring by quarter: 26–17, 20–17, 26–20, 21–24 |
| | Pts: Clark 30; Rebs: Clark 18; Asts: Lee Chi-Wei 4 | boxscore | Pts: Brooks 25; Rebs: Brooks 15; Asts: Hsieh Ya-Hsuan 8 | Arena: Xinzhuang Gymnasium; Attendance: 3,785; Referees: Yu Jung, Sung Ming-Lu, Wu Fang-Shan |

| December 22, 2024 Regular #038 | Formosa Dreamers | 97–84 | Kaohsiung Aquas | Kaohsiung City |
| 14:30 (UTC+8) | Scoring by quarter: 21–21, 14–19, 24–17, 38–27 |
| | Pts: Lin Chun-Chi 21; Rebs: Pacher 11; Asts: Wu Chia-Chun 5 | boxscore | Pts: Želionis 15; Rebs: Želionis 16; Asts: Chen Huai-An 6 | Arena: Kaohsiung Arena; Attendance: 5,328; Referees: Lan Wei-Hsiung, Lo Kuo-Hsien, Huang Shao-Po |

| December 22, 2024 Regular #039 | Taoyuan Taiwan Beer Leopards | 88–70 | New Taipei CTBC DEA | New Taipei City |
| 17:00 (UTC+8) | Scoring by quarter: 26–19, 19–21, 21–16, 22–14 |
| | Pts: Kromah 30; Rebs: Kromah, Williams 11; Asts: Gao Jin-Wei 8 | boxscore | Pts: Frankamp 19; Rebs: Brooks 12; Asts: Hsieh Ya-Hsuan 5 | Arena: Xinzhuang Gymnasium; Attendance: 3,814; Referees: Lin Chien-Hung, Huang Po-Wei, Ou Yang Yu-Hsien |

=== Matchweek 9 ===
| December 27, 2024 Regular #040 | Taipei Taishin Mars | 86–69 | Formosa Dreamers | Taichung City |
| 19:00 (UTC+8) | Scoring by quarter: 23–21, 21–15, 16–17, 26–16 |
| | Pts: Miller 18; Rebs: Miller, Eric 12; Asts: Ting Sheng-Ju 9 | boxscore | Pts: Lin Chun-Chi 15; Rebs: Gilbeck 13; Asts: Wu Chia-Chun, Creighton 2 | Arena: Taichung Intercontinental Basketball Stadium; Attendance: 2,480; Referees: Chen Chao-Hung, Huang Chen-Feng, Chen Ching-Hsiang |

| December 28, 2024 Regular #041 | New Taipei CTBC DEA | 97–91 | Hsinchu Toplus Lioneers | Hsinchu County |
| 14:30 (UTC+8) | Scoring by quarter: 25–24, 23–26, 26–15, 23–26 |
| | Pts: Brooks 29; Rebs: Brooks 19; Asts: Wei Chia-Hao 10 | boxscore | Pts: Clark 18; Rebs: Meeks 16; Asts: Kao Kuo-Hao, Lee Chi-Wei 5 | Arena: Hsinchu County Stadium; Attendance: 4,181; Referees: Chen Hung-Ming, Peng Shih-Hsuan, Huang Shao-Po |

| December 28, 2024 Regular #042 | Kaohsiung Aquas | 108–111(2OT) | New Taipei Kings | New Taipei City |
| 17:00 (UTC+8) | Scoring by quarter: 32–27, 20–20, 21–18, 20–28, Overtime: 15–18 |
| | Pts: Želionis 30; Rebs: Želionis 18; Asts: Chen Huai-An 14 | boxscore | Pts: Washburn 24; Rebs: Washburn 16; Asts: Jo. Lin 7 | Arena: Xinzhuang Gymnasium; Attendance: 5,659; Referees: Yu Jung, Hsieh Shang-Chien, Wu Fang-Shan |

| December 29, 2024 Regular #043 | Taoyuan Taiwan Beer Leopards | 106–102 | Hsinchu Toplus Lioneers | Hsinchu County |
| 14:30 (UTC+8) | Scoring by quarter: 34–28, 28–25, 26–26, 18–23 |
| | Pts: Kromah 29; Rebs: Mockevičius 16; Asts: Kromah 8 | boxscore | Pts: Kao Kuo-Hao 26; Rebs: Kao Kuo-Hao 12; Asts: Kao Kuo-Hao 6 | Arena: Hsinchu County Stadium; Attendance: 4,017; Referees: Hsieh Wen-Wei, Lai Chien-Hao, Hsu Wei-Kai |

| December 29, 2024 Regular #044 | Formosa Dreamers | 101–95 | New Taipei Kings | New Taipei City |
| 17:00 (UTC+8) | Scoring by quarter: 29–28, 29–19, 26–20, 17–28 |
| | Pts: Beech 27; Rebs: Pacher 17; Asts: Wu Chia-Chun 7 | boxscore | Pts: Washburn 26; Rebs: Washburn 12; Asts: Manigault 9 | Arena: Xinzhuang Gymnasium; Attendance: 5,812; Referees: Lin Chien-Hung, Yeh Chun-Hung, Ou Yang Yu-Hsien |

=== Matchweek 10 ===
| January 1, 2025 Regular #045 | New Taipei CTBC DEA | 79–96 | New Taipei Kings | New Taipei City |
| 17:00 (UTC+8) | Scoring by quarter: 33–30, 24–21, 10–32, 12–13 |
| | Pts: Brooks, Mack 16; Rebs: Brooks 15; Asts: Hsieh Ya-Hsuan, Krajina 6 | boxscore | Pts: Washburn 25; Rebs: Washburn 12; Asts: Lee Kai-Yan 6 | Arena: Xinzhuang Gymnasium; Attendance: 5,326; Referees: Chen Chao-Hung, Sung Ming-Lu, Tsung Hsiu-Hui |

| January 4, 2025 Regular #046 | New Taipei Kings | 98–89 | Hsinchu Toplus Lioneers | Hsinchu County |
| 14:30 (UTC+8) | Scoring by quarter: 24–22, 26–25, 33–25, 15–17 |
| | Pts: Sakakini 27; Rebs: Manigault 12; Asts: Jo. Lin 7 | boxscore | Pts: Kao Kuo-Hao 20; Rebs: Meeks 21; Asts: Kao Kuo-Hao 5 | Arena: Hsinchu County Stadium; Attendance: 5,077; Referees: Lan Wei-Hsiung, Huang Chen-Feng, Huang Po-Wei |

| January 4, 2025 Regular #047 | Taoyuan Taiwan Beer Leopards | 117–111(OT) | Formosa Dreamers | Taichung City |
| 17:00 (UTC+8) | Scoring by quarter: 26–22, 31–27, 25–30, 25–28, Overtime: 10–4 |
| | Pts: Kromah 38; Rebs: Williams 15; Asts: Gao Jin-Wei 9 | boxscore | Pts: Beech 29; Rebs: Beech 13; Asts: Lin Chun-Chi 7 | Arena: Taichung Intercontinental Basketball Stadium; Attendance: 2,417; Referees: Yu Jung, Peng Shih-Hsuan, Chen Chien-Lin |

| January 5, 2025 Regular #048 | New Taipei CTBC DEA | 83–75 | Hsinchu Toplus Lioneers | Hsinchu County |
| 14:30 (UTC+8) | Scoring by quarter: 24–21, 26–13, 19–18, 14–23 |
| | Pts: Mack 23; Rebs: Krajina 11; Asts: Hsieh Ya-Hsuan 7 | boxscore | Pts: Kao Kuo-Hao 16; Rebs: Meeks 18; Asts: Kao Kuo-Hao 6 | Arena: Hsinchu County Stadium; Attendance: 3,447; Referees: Yeh Chun-Hung, Lo Kuo-Hsien, Yang Shih-Hsien |

| January 5, 2025 Regular #049 | Kaohsiung Aquas | 90–100 | Taipei Taishin Mars | Taipei City |
| 17:00 (UTC+8) | Scoring by quarter: 26–28, 17–25, 20–26, 27–21 |
| | Pts: Morse 24; Rebs: Morse 12; Asts: Wei Liang-Che 6 | boxscore | Pts: Miller 22; Rebs: Miller 14; Asts: Ting Sheng-Ju 11 | Arena: Taipei Heping Basketball Gymnasium; Attendance: 3,326; Referees: Chen Hung-Ming, Lin Chien-Hung, Lai Chien-Hao |

=== Matchweek 11 ===
| January 8, 2025 Regular #050 | New Taipei CTBC DEA | 85–89(OT) | Taipei Taishin Mars | Taipei City |
| 19:00 (UTC+8) | Scoring by quarter: 9–23, 29–20, 19–20, 20–14, Overtime: 8–12 |
| | Pts: Mack 30; Rebs: Mack 14; Asts: Mack 6 | boxscore | Pts: Manu, Miller 20; Rebs: Robinson 15; Asts: Ting Sheng-Ju 6 | Arena: Taipei Heping Basketball Gymnasium; Attendance: 2,246; Referees: Yu Jung, Hsieh Shang-Chien, Peng Shih-Hsuan |

| January 10, 2025 Regular #051 | Taoyuan Taiwan Beer Leopards | 85–97 | Taipei Taishin Mars | Taipei City |
| 19:00 (UTC+8) | Scoring by quarter: 24–18, 12–32, 19–25, 30–22 |
| | Pts: Lin Sin-Kuan 21; Rebs: Williams 14; Asts: Gao Jin-Wei 6 | boxscore | Pts: Miller 26; Rebs: Robinson 15; Asts: Ting Sheng-Ju 4 | Arena: Taipei Heping Basketball Gymnasium; Attendance: 2,942; Referees: Chen Chao-Hung, Lan Wei-Hsiung, Sung Ming-Lu |

| January 11, 2025 Regular #052 | New Taipei CTBC DEA | 88–72 | Kaohsiung Aquas | Kaohsiung City |
| 14:30 (UTC+8) | Scoring by quarter: 21–15, 29–19, 12–17, 26–21 |
| | Pts: Mack 25; Rebs: Brooks 18; Asts: Hsieh Ya-Hsuan 11 | boxscore | Pts: Sword 17; Rebs: Morse 15; Asts: Yu Huan-Ya, Želionis 4 | Arena: Kaohsiung Arena; Attendance: 2,856; Referees: Yu Jung, Lin Chien-Hung, Chen Chien-Lin |

| January 11, 2025 Regular #053 | New Taipei Kings | 79–112 | Formosa Dreamers | Taichung City |
| 17:00 (UTC+8) | Scoring by quarter: 27–32, 25–23, 17–33, 10–24 |
| | Pts: Washburn 16; Rebs: Manigault 16; Asts: Je. Lin 7 | boxscore | Pts: Lin Chun-Chi 30; Rebs: three players 9 Asts: Lin Chun-Chi 8 | Arena: Taichung Intercontinental Basketball Stadium; Attendance: 3,000; Referees: Chen Hung-Ming, Lai Chien-Hao, Hsieh Shang-Chien |

| January 12, 2025 Regular #054 | Hsinchu Toplus Lioneers | 78–103 | Kaohsiung Aquas | Kaohsiung City |
| 14:30 (UTC+8) | Scoring by quarter: 20–24, 27–25, 15–33, 16–21 |
| | Pts: Lu Kuan-Hsuan 21; Rebs: Holyfield, Meeks 14; Asts: Kao Kuo-Hao, Tucker 3 | boxscore | Pts: Želionis 25; Rebs: Želionis 17; Asts: Chen Huai-An 7 | Arena: Kaohsiung Arena; Attendance: 4,015; Referees: Chen Chao-Hung, Sung Ming-Lu, Wu Fang-Shan |

| January 12, 2025 Regular #055 | Taoyuan Taiwan Beer Leopards | 102–110 | Formosa Dreamers | Taichung City |
| 17:00 (UTC+8) | Scoring by quarter: 22–21, 26–30, 24–31, 30–28 |
| | Pts: Kromah 35; Rebs: Mockevičius 12; Asts: Kromah 8 | boxscore | Pts: Holman 35; Rebs: Gilbeck 14; Asts: three players 4 | Arena: Taichung Intercontinental Basketball Stadium; Attendance: 2,048; Referees: Hsieh Wen-Wei, Yeh Chun-Hung, Huang Chen-Feng |

=== Matchweek 12 ===
| January 15, 2025 Regular #056 | Taipei Taishin Mars | 76–98 | Kaohsiung Aquas | Kaohsiung City |
| 19:00 (UTC+8) | Scoring by quarter: 16–19, 20–31, 24–21, 16–27 |
| | Pts: Miller 16; Rebs: Miller 13; Asts: Tsao Xun-Xiang 5 | boxscore | Pts: Sword 23; Rebs: Želionis 15; Asts: Sword 6 | Arena: Kaohsiung Arena; Attendance: 2,812; Referees: Yeh Chun-Hung, Lo Kuo-Hsien, Yang Shih-Hsien |

| January 18, 2025 Regular #057 | Formosa Dreamers | 95–105 | Kaohsiung Aquas | Kaohsiung City |
| 14:30 (UTC+8) | Scoring by quarter: 30–22, 26–29, 20–29, 19–25 |
| | Pts: Beech 24; Rebs: Beech 18; Asts: Lin Chun-Chi 9 | boxscore | Pts: Sword 39; Rebs: Želionis 13; Asts: Chiu Tzu-Hsuan 5 | Arena: Kaohsiung Arena; Attendance: 4,671; Referees: Chen Chao-Hung, Lan Wei-Hsiung, Peng Shih-Hsuan |

| January 18, 2025 Regular #058 | Taipei Taishin Mars | 105–117 | Hsinchu Toplus Lioneers | Hsinchu County |
| 17:00 (UTC+8) | Scoring by quarter: 26–30, 30–30, 20–31, 29–26 |
| | Pts: Miller 28; Rebs: Miller 16; Asts: Ting Sheng-Ju 4 | boxscore | Pts: Nolley 41; Rebs: Clark 13; Asts: Nolley 5 | Arena: Hsinchu County Stadium; Attendance: 3,822; Referees: Chen Hung-Ming, Lin Chien-Hung, Tsung Hsiu-Hui |

| January 19, 2025 Regular #059 | New Taipei CTBC DEA | 91–104 | Kaohsiung Aquas | Kaohsiung City |
| 14:30 (UTC+8) | Scoring by quarter: 26–18, 23–28, 24–28, 18–30 |
| | Pts: Mack 22; Rebs: Brooks 10; Asts: four players 4 | boxscore | Pts: Su Wen-Ju 22; Rebs: Morse 8 Asts: Yu Huan-Ya 8 | Arena: Kaohsiung Arena; Attendance: 4,608; Referees: Lai Chien-Hao, Huang Chen-Feng, Huang Po-Wei |

| January 19, 2025 Regular #060 | New Taipei Kings | 114–106 | Hsinchu Toplus Lioneers | Hsinchu County |
| 17:00 (UTC+8) | Scoring by quarter: 24–38, 23–28, 34–19, 33–21 |
| | Pts: Sakakini 34; Rebs: Sakakini 11; Asts: Je. Lin, Manigault 8 | boxscore | Pts: Nolley 44; Rebs: Clark 11; Asts: Nolley 8 | Arena: Hsinchu County Stadium; Attendance: 4,953; Referees: Yu Jung, Yeh Chun-Hung, Yang Shih-Hsien |

=== Matchweek 13 ===
| January 22, 2025 Regular #061 | Formosa Dreamers | 99–106 | Hsinchu Toplus Lioneers | Hsinchu County |
| 19:00 (UTC+8) | Scoring by quarter: 28–23, 22–33, 24–24, 25–26 |
| | Pts: Beech 21; Rebs: Pacher 12; Asts: Lin Chun-Chi 9 | boxscore | Pts: Nolley 30; Rebs: Meeks 17; Asts: Nolley 8 | Arena: Hsinchu County Stadium; Attendance: 4,051; Referees: Lin Chien-Hung, Lo Kuo-Hsien, Chen Chien-Lin |

=== Matchweek 14 ===
| February 5, 2025 Regular #062 | Kaohsiung Aquas | 91–97 | Hsinchu Toplus Lioneers | Hsinchu County |
| 19:00 (UTC+8) | Scoring by quarter: 29–23, 22–31, 21–15, 19–28 |
| | Pts: Želionis 26; Rebs: Morse 16; Asts: Sword 5 | boxscore | Pts: Nolley 34; Rebs: Meeks 15; Asts: Kao Kuo-Hao 6 | Arena: Hsinchu County Stadium; Attendance: 3,578; Referees: Hsieh Wen-Wei, Yeh Chun-Hung, Huang Po-Wei |

| February 7, 2025 Regular #063 | New Taipei CTBC DEA | 69–72 | Taipei Taishin Mars | Taipei City |
| 19:00 (UTC+8) | Scoring by quarter: 20–17, 16–27, 22–12, 11–16 |
| | Pts: Aska 19; Rebs: Aska 15; Asts: Wei Chia-Hao, Aska 4 | boxscore | Pts: McCallum 18; Rebs: Moerman 16; Asts: three players 2 | Arena: Taipei Heping Basketball Gymnasium; Attendance: 4,866; Referees: Yu Jung, Yeh Chun-Hung, Wu Fang-Shan |

| February 8, 2025 Regular #064 | New Taipei Kings | 84–100 | Taoyuan Taiwan Beer Leopards | Taoyuan City |
| 19:00 (UTC+8) | Scoring by quarter: 19–18, 20–30, 27–29, 18–23 |
| | Pts: Johnson, Manigault 18; Rebs: Manigault 13; Asts: Jo. Lin 8 | boxscore | Pts: Kromah 26; Rebs: Williams 18; Asts: Gao Jin-Wei 7 | Arena: Taoyuan Arena; Attendance: 6,869; Referees: Lin Chien-Hung, Lo Kuo-Hsien, Lan Wei-Hsiung |

| February 9, 2025 Regular #065 | Hsinchu Toplus Lioneers | 90–100 | Taipei Taishin Mars | Taipei City |
| 14:30 (UTC+8) | Scoring by quarter: 30–28, 18–25, 21–30, 21–17 |
| | Pts: Nolley 30; Rebs: Meeks 13; Asts: Kao Kuo-Hao 6 | boxscore | Pts: Moerman 26; Rebs: Moerman 13; Asts: McCallum 9 | Arena: Taipei Heping Basketball Gymnasium; Attendance: 3,853; Referees: Chen Chao-Hung, Huang Chen-Feng, Lai Chien-Hao |

| February 9, 2025 Regular #066 | Formosa Dreamers | 93–96 | Taoyuan Taiwan Beer Leopards | Taoyuan City |
| 17:00 (UTC+8) | Scoring by quarter: 28–25, 22–22, 10–20, 33–29 |
| | Pts: Ma Chien-Hao 23; Rebs: Gilbeck 12; Asts: Chiang Yu-An 9 | boxscore | Pts: Kromah 33; Rebs: Mockevičius 21; Asts: Gao Jin-Wei 9 | Arena: Taoyuan Arena; Attendance: 4,758; Referees: Chen Hung-Ming, Tsung Hsiu-Hui, Yang Shih-Hsien |

=== Matchweek 15 ===
| February 26, 2025 Regular #067 | New Taipei Kings | 102–99 | Taoyuan Taiwan Beer Leopards | Taoyuan City |
| 19:00 (UTC+8) | Scoring by quarter: 28–24, 29–28, 25–30, 20–17 |
| | Pts: Jo. Lin, Washburn 22; Rebs: Washburn 12; Asts: Jo. Lin, Manigault 8 | boxscore | Pts: Lin Sin-Kuan 24; Rebs: Mockevičius 15; Asts: Gao Jin-Wei 11 | Arena: Taoyuan Arena; Attendance: 3,989; Referees: Yeh Chun-Hung, Lo Kuo-Hsien, Wu Fang-Shan |

| February 28, 2025 Regular #068 | Kaohsiung Aquas | 79–85 | New Taipei CTBC DEA | New Taipei City |
| 17:00 (UTC+8) | Scoring by quarter: 19–23, 13–17, 20–14, 27–31 |
| | Pts: Sword 24; Rebs: Želionis 13; Asts: Chiu Tzu-Hsuan 7 | boxscore | Pts: Russell 31; Rebs: Todorović 13; Asts: Russell 8 | Arena: Xinzhuang Gymnasium; Attendance: 4,016; Referees: Chen Hung-Ming, Chen Chien-Lin, Peng Shih-Hsuan |

| March 1, 2025 Regular #069 | Hsinchu Toplus Lioneers | 82–98 | Taoyuan Taiwan Beer Leopards | Taoyuan City |
| 14:30 (UTC+8) | Scoring by quarter: 25–29, 26–25, 10–19, 21–25 |
| | Pts: Clark 25; Rebs: Clark 12; Asts: Li Han-Sheng 7 | boxscore | Pts: Lin Sin-Kuan 21; Rebs: Mockevičius 17; Asts: Gao Jin-Wei 9 | Arena: Taoyuan Arena; Attendance: 5,531; Referees: Chen Chao-Hung, Sung Ming-Lu, Huang Po-Wei |

| March 1, 2025 Regular #070 | New Taipei Kings | 100–106 | Taipei Taishin Mars | Taipei City |
| 17:00 (UTC+8) | Scoring by quarter: 25–27, 31–22, 27–31, 17–26 |
| | Pts: Manigault 33; Rebs: Manigault 14; Asts: Jo. Lin 6 | boxscore | Pts: Chien 23; Rebs: Moerman 16; Asts: McCallum 7 | Arena: Taipei Heping Basketball Gymnasium; Attendance: 4,798; Referees: Yu Jung, Tsung Hsiu-Hui, Lai Chien-Hao |

| March 2, 2025 Regular #071 | New Taipei CTBC DEA | 116–106 | Taoyuan Taiwan Beer Leopards | Taoyuan City |
| 14:30 (UTC+8) | Scoring by quarter: 21–28, 30–20, 30–31, 35–27 |
| | Pts: Russell 37; Rebs: Todorović 17; Asts: Russell 9 | boxscore | Pts: Gao Jin-Wei 24; Rebs: Williams 11; Asts: Gao Jin-Wei 10 | Arena: Taoyuan Arena; Attendance: 5,019; Referees: Hsieh Wen-Wei, Hsieh Shang-Chien, Ou Yang Yu-Hsien |

| March 2, 2025 Regular #072 | Kaohsiung Aquas | 99–80 | Taipei Taishin Mars | Taipei City |
| 17:00 (UTC+8) | Scoring by quarter: 31–19, 16–29, 30–15, 22–17 |
| | Pts: Morse, Želionis 23; Rebs: Morse, Želionis 14; Asts: Chiu Tzu-Hsuan, Yu Huan-Ya 4 | boxscore | Pts: Manu 18; Rebs: Eric, Miller 7 Asts: McCallum 6 | Arena: Taipei Heping Basketball Gymnasium; Attendance: 2,991; Referees: Lin Chien-Hung, Huang Chen-Feng, Yang Shih-Hsien |

=== Matchweek 16 ===
| March 5, 2025 Regular #073 | Formosa Dreamers | 118–103 | Taipei Taishin Mars | Taipei City |
| 19:00 (UTC+8) | Scoring by quarter: 33–27, 34–18, 34–30, 17–28 |
| | Pts: Beech 33; Rebs: Bennett 16; Asts: Wu Chia-Chun 8 | boxscore | Pts: McCallum 20; Rebs: Eric 11; Asts: McCallum 6 | Arena: Taipei Heping Basketball Gymnasium; Attendance: 2,568; Referees: Chen Hung-Ming, Sung Ming-Lu, Chen Ching-Hsiang |

| March 8, 2025 Regular #074 | Hsinchu Toplus Lioneers | 88–104 | Kaohsiung Aquas | Kaohsiung City |
| 14:30 (UTC+8) | Scoring by quarter: 20–30, 30–31, 24–17, 14–26 |
| | Pts: Nolley 31; Rebs: Nolley 14; Asts: Li Han-Sheng, Nolley 5 | boxscore | Pts: Sword 32; Rebs: Morse 10; Asts: Yu Huan-Ya 6 | Arena: Kaohsiung Arena; Attendance: 5,081; Referees: Yu Jung, Hsieh Wen-Wei, Tsung Hsiu-Hui |

| March 8, 2025 Regular #075 | Taoyuan Taiwan Beer Leopards | 89–93 | New Taipei CTBC DEA | New Taipei City |
| 17:00 (UTC+8) | Scoring by quarter: 14–23, 23–25, 20–24, 32–23 |
| | Pts: Gao Jin-Wei 25; Rebs: Williams 11; Asts: Kromah 6 | boxscore | Pts: Russell 18; Rebs: Todorović 20; Asts: Hsieh Ya-Hsuan, Russell 6 | Arena: Xinzhuang Gymnasium; Attendance: 3,481; Referees: Lin Chien-Hung, Lai Chien-Hao, Huang Shao-Po |

| March 9, 2025 Regular #076 | Formosa Dreamers | 95–109 | Kaohsiung Aquas | Kaohsiung City |
| 14:30 (UTC+8) | Scoring by quarter: 21–26, 23–34, 24–25, 27–24 |
| | Pts: Ma Chien-Hao 20; Rebs: Gilbeck 12; Asts: Lin Chun-Chi 7 | boxscore | Pts: Želionis 22; Rebs: Morse, Želionis 10; Asts: Yu Huan-Ya 6 | Arena: Kaohsiung Arena; Attendance: 6,212; Referees: Yeh Chun-Hung, Hsieh Shang-Chien, Hsu Wei-Kai |

| March 9, 2025 Regular #077 | Taipei Taishin Mars | 82–105 | New Taipei CTBC DEA | New Taipei City |
| 17:00 (UTC+8) | Scoring by quarter: 28–27, 19–23, 21–28, 14–27 |
| | Pts: McCallum 16; Rebs: Miller 10; Asts: McCallum 7 | boxscore | Pts: Russell 40; Rebs: Todorović 22; Asts: Russell 6 | Arena: Xinzhuang Gymnasium; Attendance: 2,935; Referees: Chen Chao-Hung, Lan Wei-Hsiung, Lo Kuo-Hsien |

=== Matchweek 17 ===
| March 12, 2025 Regular #078 | Taoyuan Taiwan Beer Leopards | 77–94 | Hsinchu Toplus Lioneers | Hsinchu County |
| 19:00 (UTC+8) | Scoring by quarter: 19–24, 18–31, 23–20, 17–19 |
| | Pts: Williams 24; Rebs: Williams 15; Asts: Kromah 8 | boxscore | Pts: Clark 28; Rebs: Nolley 9 Asts: Li Han-Sheng, Lu Kuan-Hsuan 5 | Arena: Hsinchu County Stadium; Attendance: 3,078; Referees: Yeh Chun-Hung, Lan Wei-Hsiung, Chen Chien-Lin |

| March 15, 2025 Regular #079 | New Taipei CTBC DEA | 98–75 | Formosa Dreamers | Taichung City |
| 14:30 (UTC+8) | Scoring by quarter: 26–12, 21–28, 29–14, 22–21 |
| | Pts: Todorović 24; Rebs: Brooks 14; Asts: Russell 7 | boxscore | Pts: Lin Chun-Chi 14; Rebs: Gilbeck 18; Asts: Lin Chun-Chi 4 | Arena: Taichung Intercontinental Basketball Stadium; Attendance: 2,592; Referees: Yu Jung, Huang Chen-Feng, Tsung Hsiu-Hui |

| March 15, 2025 Regular #080 | New Taipei Kings | 114–111 | Hsinchu Toplus Lioneers | Hsinchu County |
| 17:00 (UTC+8) | Scoring by quarter: 28–32, 22–29, 31–32, 33–18 |
| | Pts: Washburn 42; Rebs: Washburn 13; Asts: Manigault 6 | boxscore | Pts: Nolley 29; Rebs: Nolley 7 Asts: Nolley 9 | Arena: Hsinchu County Stadium; Attendance: 5,411; Referees: Chen Hung-Ming, Huang Po-Wei, Peng Shih-Hsuan |

| March 16, 2025 Regular #081 | Taipei Taishin Mars | 95–97 | Formosa Dreamers | Taichung City |
| 14:30 (UTC+8) | Scoring by quarter: 19–22, 24–26, 24–25, 28–24 |
| | Pts: Eric 24; Rebs: Moerman 13; Asts: Tsao Xun-Xiang 5 | boxscore | Pts: Chiang Yu-An 25; Rebs: Gilbeck 14; Asts: Lin Chun-Chi 5 | Arena: Taichung Intercontinental Basketball Stadium; Attendance: 2,858; Referees: Chen Hung-Ming, Lo Kuo-Hsien, Wu Fang-Shan |

| March 16, 2025 Regular #082 | Kaohsiung Aquas | 103–116 | Hsinchu Toplus Lioneers | Hsinchu County |
| 17:00 (UTC+8) | Scoring by quarter: 30–31, 28–31, 25–22, 20–32 |
| | Pts: Želionis 22; Rebs: Morse 11; Asts: Chiu Tzu-Hsuan, Chen Huai-An 6 | boxscore | Pts: Nolley 44; Rebs: Meeks 11; Asts: Nolley 6 | Arena: Hsinchu County Stadium; Attendance: 4,791; Referees: Chen Chao-Hung, Sung Ming-Lu, Huang Shao-Po |

=== Matchweek 18 ===
| Rescheduled (Note: The match, originally scheduled for March 19, 2025, was rescheduled to April 2, 2025 due to the 2025 FIBA Asia Cup qualification.) Regular #083 | Kaohsiung Aquas | vs. | New Taipei Kings | New Taipei City |
| | Scoring by quarter: –, –, –, – |
| | | boxscore | | Arena: Xinzhuang Gymnasium |

| March 22, 2025 Regular #084 | Kaohsiung Aquas | 87–101 | Formosa Dreamers | Taichung City |
| 14:30 (UTC+8) | Scoring by quarter: 10–28, 28–21, 23–23, 26–29 |
| | Pts: Chiu Tzu-Hsuan 23; Rebs: Želionis 10; Asts: Yu Huan-Ya 4 | boxscore | Pts: Chiang Yu-An 27; Rebs: Gilbeck 16; Asts: Holman 5 | Arena: Taichung Intercontinental Basketball Stadium; Attendance: 2,793; Referees: Peng Shih-Hsuan, Lan Wei-Hsiung, Chen Hung-Ming |

| March 22, 2025 Regular #085 | Taipei Taishin Mars | 87–114 | New Taipei Kings | New Taipei City |
| 17:00 (UTC+8) | Scoring by quarter: 15–24, 23–29, 33–32, 16–29 |
| | Pts: Manu 17; Rebs: Moerman 15; Asts: McCallum 3 | boxscore | Pts: Washburn 26; Rebs: Washburn 15; Asts: Manigault 10 | Arena: Xinzhuang Gymnasium; Attendance: 3,804; Referees: Chen Chao-Hung, Hsieh Shang-Chien, Yang Shih-Hsien |

| March 23, 2025 Regular #086 | Hsinchu Toplus Lioneers | 105–110 | Formosa Dreamers | Taichung City |
| 14:30 (UTC+8) | Scoring by quarter: 19–26, 32–29, 20–18, 34–37 |
| | Pts: Nolley 29; Rebs: Nolley, Laszewski 11; Asts: Nolley, Li Han-Sheng 5 | boxscore | Pts: Beech 28; Rebs: Holman 12; Asts: Lin Chun-Chi 8 | Arena: Taichung Intercontinental Basketball Stadium; Attendance: 2,862; Referees: Lin Chien-Hung, Lai Chien-Hao, Ou Yang Yu-Hsien |

| March 23, 2025 Regular #087 | Taoyuan Taiwan Beer Leopards | 97–108 | New Taipei Kings | New Taipei City |
| 17:00 (UTC+8) | Scoring by quarter: 29–28, 26–34, 23–26, 19–20 |
| | Pts: Kromah 26; Rebs: Williams 14; Asts: Gao Jin-Wei, Kromah 6 | boxscore | Pts: Je. Lin 36; Rebs: Washburn 18; Asts: Je. Lin 7 | Arena: Xinzhuang Gymnasium; Attendance: 3,823; Referees: Yu Jung, Sung Ming-Lu, Chen Ching-Hsiang |

=== Matchweek 19 ===
| March 26, 2025 Regular #088 | Kaohsiung Aquas | 87–78 | New Taipei CTBC DEA | New Taipei City |
| 19:00 (UTC+8) | Scoring by quarter: 23–23, 22–20, 10–22, 32–13 |
| | Pts: Želionis 22; Rebs: Morse 13; Asts: Yu Huan-Ya, Chiu Tzu-Hsuan 6 | boxscore | Pts: Brooks 19; Rebs: Aska 10; Asts: three players 4 | Arena: Xinzhuang Gymnasium; Attendance: 2,933; Referees: Chen Chao-Hung, Sung Ming-Lu, Yang Shih-Hsien |

| March 29, 2025 Regular #089 | Formosa Dreamers | 81–88 | New Taipei CTBC DEA | New Taipei City |
| 14:30 (UTC+8) | Scoring by quarter: 27–27, 12–18, 17–16, 25–27 |
| | Pts: Ma Chien-Hao 26; Rebs: Lončar 17; Asts: Wu Chia-Chun 6 | boxscore | Pts: Hsieh Ya-Hsuan 24; Rebs: Krajina 9 Asts: Hsieh Ya-Hsuan 6 | Arena: Xinzhuang Gymnasium; Attendance: 4,047; Referees: Yu Jung, Huang Chen-Feng, Huang Shao-Po |

| March 29, 2025 Regular #090 | Taoyuan Taiwan Beer Leopards | 88–97 | Taipei Taishin Mars | Taipei City |
| 17:00 (UTC+8) | Scoring by quarter: 20–16, 24–22, 21–27, 23–32 |
| | Pts: Gao Jin-Wei 20; Rebs: Mockevičius 20; Asts: Kromah 6 | boxscore | Pts: Miller 28; Rebs: Moerman 13; Asts: Ting Sheng-Ju 9 | Arena: Taipei Heping Basketball Gymnasium; Attendance: 5,568; Referees: Chen Hung-Ming, Lai Chien-Hao, Ou Yang Yu-Hsien |

| March 30, 2025 Regular #091 | New Taipei Kings | 100–98 | New Taipei CTBC DEA | New Taipei City |
| 14:30 (UTC+8) | Scoring by quarter: 25–27, 25–21, 23–34, 27–16 |
| | Pts: Je. Lin 20; Rebs: Washburn 17; Asts: Je. Lin 6 | boxscore | Pts: Aska, Krajina 21; Rebs: Brooks 13; Asts: Lin Wei-Han 11 | Arena: Xinzhuang Gymnasium; Attendance: 6,068; Referees: Lin Chien-Hung, Lo Kuo-Hsien, Chen Chien-Lin |

| March 30, 2025 Regular #092 | Hsinchu Toplus Lioneers | 98–117 | Taipei Taishin Mars | Taipei City |
| 17:00 (UTC+8) | Scoring by quarter: 25–26, 29–32, 18–29, 26–30 |
| | Pts: Nolley, Meeks 23; Rebs: Meeks 14; Asts: Nolley 8 | boxscore | Pts: McCallum 27; Rebs: Moerman 17; Asts: McCallum 12 | Arena: Taipei Heping Basketball Gymnasium; Attendance: 3,827; Referees: Yeh Chun-Hung, Lan Wei-Hsiung, Peng Shih-Hsuan |

=== Matchweek 20 ===
| April 2, 2025 Regular #083 | Kaohsiung Aquas | 91–111 | New Taipei Kings | New Taipei City |
| 19:00 (UTC+8) | Scoring by quarter: 18–29, 30–28, 26–24, 17–30 |
| | Pts: Sword 22; Rebs: Morse, Želionis 7 Asts: Chen Huai-An 5 | boxscore | Pts: Daye 32; Rebs: Daye 8 Asts: Manigault 11 | Arena: Xinzhuang Gymnasium; Attendance: 3,066; Referees: Yeh Chun-Hung, Tsung Hsiu-Hui, Wu Fang-Shan |

| April 4, 2025 Regular #093 | Taipei Taishin Mars | 97–100 | Taoyuan Taiwan Beer Leopards | Taoyuan City |
| 17:00 (UTC+8) | Scoring by quarter: 30–20, 30–36, 20–26, 17–18 |
| | Pts: Miller 22; Rebs: Miller 21; Asts: Ting Sheng-Ju 9 | boxscore | Pts: Lin Sin-Kuan 25; Rebs: Mockevičius 16; Asts: Kromah 6 | Arena: Taoyuan Arena; Attendance: 4,838; Referees: Hsieh Wen-Wei, Lo Kuo-Hsien, Chen Chien-Lin |

| April 5, 2025 Regular #094 | Kaohsiung Aquas | 92–106 | New Taipei Kings | New Taipei City |
| 14:30 (UTC+8) | Scoring by quarter: 29–33, 17–27, 29–11, 17–35 |
| | Pts: Morse 22; Rebs: Sword 11; Asts: Sword 6 | boxscore | Pts: Je. Lin 29; Rebs: Washburn 10; Asts: Je. Lin 6 | Arena: Xinzhuang Gymnasium; Attendance: 4,295; Referees: Yu Jung, Lai Chien-Hao, Chen Ching-Hsiang |

| April 5, 2025 Regular #095 | Formosa Dreamers | 90–107 | Hsinchu Toplus Lioneers | Hsinchu County |
| 17:00 (UTC+8) | Scoring by quarter: 20–28, 18–31, 30–27, 22–21 |
| | Pts: Lin Chun-Chi 21; Rebs: Lončar 13; Asts: Lončar 4 | boxscore | Pts: Nolley 30; Rebs: Laszewski 10; Asts: Nolley 10 | Arena: Hsinchu County Stadium; Attendance: 5,091; Referees: Chen Chao-Hung, Sung Ming-Lu, Wu Fang-Shan |

| April 6, 2025 Regular #096 | Taipei Taishin Mars | 96–112 | New Taipei Kings | New Taipei City |
| 14:30 (UTC+8) | Scoring by quarter: 32–27, 17–26, 25–28, 22–31 |
| | Pts: McCallum 27; Rebs: Eric, Miller 13; Asts: Manu 5 | boxscore | Pts: Washburn 26; Rebs: Washburn 12; Asts: Manigault 10 | Arena: Xinzhuang Gymnasium; Attendance: 3,866; Referees: Lin Chien-Hung, Huang Chen-Feng, Huang Po-Wei |

| April 6, 2025 Regular #097 | New Taipei CTBC DEA | 97–91 | Hsinchu Toplus Lioneers | Hsinchu County |
| 17:00 (UTC+8) | Scoring by quarter: 31–28, 19–26, 22–30, 25–7 |
| | Pts: Krajina 28; Rebs: Krajina 13; Asts: Tseng Wen-Ting 4 | boxscore | Pts: Li Han-Sheng 17; Rebs: Laszewski 13; Asts: Li Han-Sheng 7 | Arena: Hsinchu County Stadium; Attendance: 3,547; Referees: Chen Hung-Ming, Hsieh Shang-Chien, Hsu Wei-Kai |

=== Matchweek 21 ===
| April 9, 2025 Regular #098 | Taipei Taishin Mars | 92–103 | Hsinchu Toplus Lioneers | Hsinchu County |
| 19:00 (UTC+8) | Scoring by quarter: 19–33, 26–27, 26–27, 21–16 |
| | Pts: Miller 18; Rebs: Moerman 11; Asts: Ting Sheng-Ju 7 | boxscore | Pts: Nolley 31; Rebs: Meeks 14; Asts: Nolley 6 | Arena: Hsinchu County Stadium; Attendance: 3,047; Referees: Yeh Chun-Hung, Chen Chien-Lin, Yang Shih-Hsien |

| April 11, 2025 Regular #099 | Kaohsiung Aquas | 103–107 | Taoyuan Taiwan Beer Leopards | Taoyuan City |
| 19:00 (UTC+8) | Scoring by quarter: 25–31, 24–27, 31–25, 23–24 |
| | Pts: Chiu Tzu-Hsuan, Yu Huan-Ya 21; Rebs: Wesson 15; Asts: Sword 5 | boxscore | Pts: Kromah 32; Rebs: Mockevičius 10; Asts: Kromah 7 | Arena: Taoyuan Arena; Attendance: 3,813; Referees: Yeh Chun-Hung, Tsung Hsiu-Hui, Huang Po-Wei |

| April 12, 2025 Regular #100 | Formosa Dreamers | 66–72 | Taipei Taishin Mars | Taipei City |
| 14:30 (UTC+8) | Scoring by quarter: 12–19, 16–14, 21–18, 17–21 |
| | Pts: Lončar 17; Rebs: Lončar 21; Asts: Chiang Yu-An 4 | boxscore | Pts: Manu 21; Rebs: Eric 14; Asts: Ting Sheng-Ju 5 | Arena: Taipei Heping Basketball Gymnasium; Attendance: 4,926; Referees: Chen Hung-Ming, Lai Chien-Hao, Hsieh Shang-Chien |

| April 12, 2025 Regular #101 | Hsinchu Toplus Lioneers | 100–111 | New Taipei Kings | New Taipei City |
| 17:00 (UTC+8) | Scoring by quarter: 22–22, 30–32, 28–37, 20–20 |
| | Pts: Nolley, Meeks 25; Rebs: Meeks 15; Asts: Nolley 11 | boxscore | Pts: Washburn 26; Rebs: Manigault 13; Asts: Manigault 9 | Arena: Xinzhuang Gymnasium; Attendance: 4,774; Referees: Hsieh Wen-Wei, Lo Kuo-Hsien, Wu Fang-Shan |

| April 13, 2025 Regular #102 | Kaohsiung Aquas | 96–76 | Taipei Taishin Mars | Taipei City |
| 14:30 (UTC+8) | Scoring by quarter: 25–16, 26–22, 24–20, 21–18 |
| | Pts: Wesson 21; Rebs: Wesson 19; Asts: Yu Huan-Ya 6 | boxscore | Pts: Moerman 21; Rebs: Moerman 13; Asts: Ting Sheng-Ju, McCallum 5 | Arena: Taipei Heping Basketball Gymnasium; Attendance: 3,699; Referees: Yu Jung, Huang Chen-Feng, Hsu Wei-Kai |

| April 13, 2025 Regular #103 | Taoyuan Taiwan Beer Leopards | 87–68 | New Taipei Kings | New Taipei City |
| 17:00 (UTC+8) | Scoring by quarter: 12–16, 16–22, 23–13, 36–17 |
| | Pts: Kromah 27; Rebs: Williams 16; Asts: Kromah 7 | boxscore | Pts: Manigault 19; Rebs: Manigault 16; Asts: Je. Lin 6 | Arena: Xinzhuang Gymnasium; Attendance: 4,537; Referees: Chen Chao-Hung, Sung Ming-Lu, Peng Shih-Hsuan |

=== Matchweek 22 ===
| April 16, 2025 Regular #104 | New Taipei Kings | 83–107 | Taipei Taishin Mars | Taipei City |
| 19:00 (UTC+8) | Scoring by quarter: 24–26, 18–22, 23–25, 18–34 |
| | Pts: Je. Lin 17; Rebs: Manigault 12; Asts: Je. Lin 5 | boxscore | Pts: Moerman 30; Rebs: Moerman 15; Asts: McCallum 10 | Arena: Taipei Heping Basketball Gymnasium; Attendance: 4,555; Referees: Lin Chien-Hung, Lan Wei-Hsiung, Huang Shao-Po |

| April 19, 2025 Regular #105 | Formosa Dreamers | 113–95 | New Taipei CTBC DEA | New Taipei City |
| 14:30 (UTC+8) | Scoring by quarter: 28–20, 20–18, 34–28, 31–29 |
| | Pts: Beech 25; Rebs: Beech 14; Asts: Holman 6 | boxscore | Pts: Russell 37; Rebs: Krajina 16; Asts: Wei Chia-Hao, Russell 4 | Arena: Xinzhuang Gymnasium; Attendance: 4,403; Referees: Chen Chao-Hung, Huang Chen-Feng, Huang Po-Wei |

| April 19, 2025 Regular #106 | Hsinchu Toplus Lioneers | 83–95 | Taoyuan Taiwan Beer Leopards | Taoyuan City |
| 17:00 (UTC+8) | Scoring by quarter: 24–23, 29–30, 13–31, 17–11 |
| | Pts: Kao Kuo-Hao 23; Rebs: Meeks 13; Asts: Li Han-Sheng, Kao Kuo-Hao 5 | boxscore | Pts: Kromah 18; Rebs: Mockevičius 20; Asts: Gao Jin-Wei 7 | Arena: Taoyuan Arena; Attendance: 6,218; Referees: Yu Jung, Hsieh Shang-Chien, Chen Ching-Hsiang |

| April 20, 2025 Regular #107 | New Taipei Kings | 111–79 | New Taipei CTBC DEA | New Taipei City |
| 14:30 (UTC+8) | Scoring by quarter: 30–25, 26–27, 29–10, 26–17 |
| | Pts: Sakakini 28; Rebs: Sakakini 14; Asts: Je. Lin 8 | boxscore | Pts: Russell 28; Rebs: Brooks 12; Asts: Lin Wei-Han 4 | Arena: Xinzhuang Gymnasium; Attendance: 6,043; Referees: Yeh Chun-Hung, Tsung Hsiu-Hui, Lai Chien-Hao |

| April 20, 2025 Regular #108 | Kaohsiung Aquas | 103–75 | Taoyuan Taiwan Beer Leopards | Taoyuan City |
| 17:00 (UTC+8) | Scoring by quarter: 23–17, 32–28, 25–19, 23–11 |
| | Pts: Chiu Tzu-Hsuan 24; Rebs: Wesson 15; Asts: Yu Huan-Ya 8 | boxscore | Pts: Gao Jin-Wei 19; Rebs: Mockevičius 14; Asts: Gao Jin-Wei 6 | Arena: Taoyuan Arena; Attendance: 5,322; Referees: Chen Hung-Ming, Hsieh Wen-Wei, Lo Kuo-Hsien |

=== Matchweek 23 ===
| April 23, 2025 Regular #109 | New Taipei Kings | 114–109 | Taoyuan Taiwan Beer Leopards | Taoyuan City |
| 19:00 (UTC+8) | Scoring by quarter: 21–18, 33–30, 29–24, 31–37 |
| | Pts: Manigault 32; Rebs: Manigault 14; Asts: Jo. Lin 8 | boxscore | Pts: Gao Jin-Wei 30; Rebs: Williams 15; Asts: Gao Jin-Wei 8 | Arena: Taoyuan Arena; Attendance: 4,205; Referees: Lin Chien-Hung, Yeh Chun-Hung, Wu Fang-Shan |

| April 25, 2025 Regular #110 | Hsinchu Toplus Lioneers | 101–103(OT) | New Taipei CTBC DEA | New Taipei City |
| 19:00 (UTC+8) | Scoring by quarter: 26–18, 29–35, 16–14, 22–26, Overtime: 8–10 |
| | Pts: Nolley 35; Rebs: Meeks 18; Asts: Nolley 8 | boxscore | Pts: Brooks 23; Rebs: Krajina 21; Asts: Lin Wei-Han 8 | Arena: Xinzhuang Gymnasium; Attendance: 3,174; Referees: Yeh Chun-Hung, Sung Ming-Lu, Peng Shih-Hsuan |

| April 26, 2025 Regular #111 | Formosa Dreamers | 110–95 | Taoyuan Taiwan Beer Leopards | Taoyuan City |
| 14:30 (UTC+8) | Scoring by quarter: 34–22, 30–26, 22–21, 24–26 |
| | Pts: Beech 27; Rebs: Holman 11; Asts: Lin Chun-Chi, Wu Chia-Chun 7 | boxscore | Pts: Williams 23; Rebs: Mockevičius 12; Asts: Gao Jin-Wei 7 | Arena: Taoyuan Arena; Attendance: 6,124; Referees: Yu Jung, Lai Chien-Hao, Tsung Hsiu-Hui |

| April 26, 2025 Regular #112 | New Taipei Kings | 83–97 | Kaohsiung Aquas | Kaohsiung City |
| 17:00 (UTC+8) | Scoring by quarter: 23–24, 22–27, 16–25, 22–21 |
| | Pts: Manigault 26; Rebs: Sakakini 9 Asts: Jo. Lin 6 | boxscore | Pts: Morse 24; Rebs: Wesson 21; Asts: Wesson 6 | Arena: Kaohsiung Arena; Attendance: 7,386; Referees: Lo Kuo-Hsien, Huang Chen-Feng, Chen Chien-Lin |

| April 27, 2025 Regular #113 | Taipei Taishin Mars | 89–86 | Taoyuan Taiwan Beer Leopards | Taoyuan City |
| 14:30 (UTC+8) | Scoring by quarter: 24–24, 21–26, 25–17, 19–19 |
| | Pts: McCallum 28; Rebs: Manu 12; Asts: Ting Sheng-Ju 7 | boxscore | Pts: Kromah 25; Rebs: Williams 16; Asts: Gao Jin-Wei 7 | Arena: Taoyuan Arena; Attendance: 5,738; Referees: Chen Chao-Hung, Lan Wei-Hsiung, Yang Shih-Hsien |

| April 27, 2025 Regular #114 | New Taipei CTBC DEA | 80–91(OT) | Kaohsiung Aquas | Kaohsiung City |
| 17:00 (UTC+8) | Scoring by quarter: 14–28, 23–18, 20–15, 18–14, Overtime: 5–16 |
| | Pts: Krajina 19; Rebs: Krajina 18; Asts: Wei Chia-Hao 6 | boxscore | Pts: Wesson 20; Rebs: Morse 14; Asts: Chiu Tzu-Hsuan 7 | Arena: Kaohsiung Arena; Attendance: 5,015; Referees: Chen Hung-Ming, Huang Po-Wei, Hsieh Shang-Chien |

=== Matchweek 24 ===
| April 29, 2025 Regular #115 | New Taipei CTBC DEA | 77–85 | Taoyuan Taiwan Beer Leopards | Taoyuan City |
| 19:00 (UTC+8) | Scoring by quarter: 14–19, 19–10, 18–26, 26–30 |
| | Pts: Russell 17; Rebs: Brooks 10; Asts: Lin Wei-Han, Russell 8 | boxscore | Pts: Kromah 24; Rebs: Williams 14; Asts: Gao Jin-Wei, Kromah 7 | Arena: Taoyuan Arena; Attendance: 3,064; Referees: Yeh Chun-Hung, Lo Kuo-Hsien, Chen Chien-Lin |

| May 3, 2025 Regular #116 | Hsinchu Toplus Lioneers | 89–99 | Formosa Dreamers | Taichung City |
| 14:30 (UTC+8) | Scoring by quarter: 23–26, 30–14, 24–30, 12–29 |
| | Pts: Nolley 20; Rebs: Meeks 19; Asts: Li Han-Sheng 5 | boxscore | Pts: Ma Chien-Hao 23; Rebs: Beech 16; Asts: three players 4 | Arena: Taichung Intercontinental Basketball Stadium; Attendance: 2,439; Referees: Chen Hung-Ming, Huang Chen-Feng, Tsung Hsiu-Hui |

| Rescheduled (Note: The match, originally scheduled for May 3, 2025, was rescheduled to May 9, 2025 due to the 2025 Basketball Champions League Asia – East.) Regular #117 | Taipei Taishin Mars | vs. | New Taipei Kings | New Taipei City |
| | Scoring by quarter: –, –, –, – |
| | | boxscore | | Arena: Xinzhuang Gymnasium |

| May 3, 2025 Regular #119 | New Taipei CTBC DEA | 76–121 | New Taipei Kings | New Taipei City |
| 17:00 (UTC+8) | Scoring by quarter: 14–35, 25–33, 17–31, 20–22 |
| | Pts: Hsieh Ya-Hsuan 18; Rebs: Krajina 16; Asts: Wei Chia-Hao 5 | boxscore | Pts: Sakakini 32; Rebs: Manigault 17; Asts: Jo. Lin 8 | Arena: Xinzhuang Gymnasium; Attendance: 5,038; Referees: Yu Jung, Peng Shih-Hsuan, Yang Shih-Hsien |

| May 4, 2025 Regular #118 | Kaohsiung Aquas | 101–104 | Formosa Dreamers | Taichung City |
| 14:30 (UTC+8) | Scoring by quarter: 23–29, 28–24, 27–23, 23–28 |
| | Pts: Wesson 25; Rebs: Wesson 16; Asts: Yu Huan-Ya, Chen Huai-An 4 | boxscore | Pts: Ma Chien-Hao 28; Rebs: Gilbeck 8 Asts: Lin Chun-Chi 6 | Arena: Taichung Intercontinental Basketball Stadium; Attendance: 2,813; Referees: Chen Chao-Hung, Sung Ming-Lu, Wu Fang-Shan |

| Rescheduled (Note: The match, originally scheduled for May 4, 2025, was rescheduled to May 3, 2025 due to the 2025 Basketball Champions League Asia – East.) Regular #119 | New Taipei CTBC DEA | vs. | New Taipei Kings | New Taipei City |
| | Scoring by quarter: –, –, –, – |
| | | boxscore | | Arena: Xinzhuang Gymnasium |

=== Matchweek 25 ===
| Rescheduled (Note: The match, originally scheduled for May 7, 2025, was rescheduled to May 8, 2025 due to the 2025 Basketball Champions League Asia – East.) Regular #120 | Taoyuan Taiwan Beer Leopards | vs. | New Taipei Kings | New Taipei City |
| | Scoring by quarter: –, –, –, – |
| | | boxscore | | Arena: Xinzhuang Gymnasium |

| May 8, 2025 Regular #120 | Taoyuan Taiwan Beer Leopards | 84–117 | New Taipei Kings | New Taipei City |
| 19:00 (UTC+8) | Scoring by quarter: 12–48, 22–23, 27–26, 23–20 |
| | Pts: Williams 23; Rebs: Mockevičius 13; Asts: Kromah 6 | boxscore | Pts: Je. Lin 25; Rebs: Washburn 14; Asts: Jo. Lin 9 | Arena: Xinzhuang Gymnasium; Attendance: 3,073; Referees: Chen Hung-Ming, Lin Chien-Hung, Lai Chien-Hao |

| May 9, 2025 Regular #117 | Taipei Taishin Mars | 97–102 | New Taipei Kings | New Taipei City |
| 19:00 (UTC+8) | Scoring by quarter: 28–24, 22–28, 23–23, 24–27 |
| | Pts: Eric 23; Rebs: Eric 12; Asts: Manu 6 | boxscore | Pts: Washburn 20; Rebs: Manigault 11; Asts: Manigault 7 | Arena: Xinzhuang Gymnasium; Attendance: 3,423; Referees: Chen Chao-Hung, Huang Chen-Feng, Lo Kuo-Hsien |

| May 10, 2025 Regular #121 | Taoyuan Taiwan Beer Leopards | 95–76 | New Taipei CTBC DEA | New Taipei City |
| 14:30 (UTC+8) | Scoring by quarter: 26–20, 25–24, 14–20, 30–12 |
| | Pts: Kromah 31; Rebs: Mockevičius 14; Asts: Kromah 9 | boxscore | Pts: Russell 31; Rebs: Krajina 12; Asts: Hsieh Ya-Hsuan 5 | Arena: Xinzhuang Gymnasium; Attendance: 3,965; Referees: Yu Jung, Yeh Chun-Hung, Sung Ming-Lu |

| May 10, 2025 Regular #122 | Formosa Dreamers | 79–106 | Hsinchu Toplus Lioneers | Hsinchu County |
| 17:00 (UTC+8) | Scoring by quarter: 29–31, 24–29, 15–24, 11–22 |
| | Pts: Beech 24; Rebs: Beech 9 Asts: Lin Chun-Chi, Wu Chia-Chun 5 | boxscore | Pts: Nolley 30; Rebs: Meeks 13; Asts: Kao Kuo-Hao 5 | Arena: Hsinchu County Stadium; Attendance: 5,288; Referees: Hsieh Wen-Wei, Lan Wei-Hsiung, Lai Chien-Hao |

| May 11, 2025 Regular #123 | Taipei Taishin Mars | 89–96 | New Taipei CTBC DEA | New Taipei City |
| 14:30 (UTC+8) | Scoring by quarter: 23–31, 25–31, 22–11, 19–23 |
| | Pts: McCallum 26; Rebs: Eric 12; Asts: McCallum 5 | boxscore | Pts: Russell 21; Rebs: Krajina 15; Asts: Russell 10 | Arena: Xinzhuang Gymnasium; Attendance: 4,054; Referees: Chen Hung-Ming, Lin Chien-Hung, Hsieh Shang-Chien |

| May 11, 2025 Regular #124 | Kaohsiung Aquas | 99–118 | Hsinchu Toplus Lioneers | Hsinchu County |
| 17:00 (UTC+8) | Scoring by quarter: 34–34, 18–26, 20–31, 27–27 |
| | Pts: Sword 23; Rebs: Wesson 8 Asts: Yu Huan-Ya 9 | boxscore | Pts: Nolley 39; Rebs: three players 10; Asts: Nolley 10 | Arena: Hsinchu County Stadium; Attendance: 4,312; Referees: Yu Jung, Huang Chen-Feng, Peng Shih-Hsuan |

=== Matchweek 26 ===
| May 17, 2025 Regular #125 | New Taipei Kings | 78–115 | Formosa Dreamers | Taichung City |
| 17:00 (UTC+8) | Scoring by quarter: 21–35, 25–24, 13–29, 19–27 |
| | Pts: Lin Li-Jen 16; Rebs: three players 7 Asts: three players 3 | boxscore | Pts: Lu Kuan-Liang 19; Rebs: Beech 13; Asts: Lin Chun-Chi 6 | Arena: Taichung Intercontinental Basketball Stadium; Attendance: 3,000; Referees: Yu Jung, Sung Ming-Lu, Hsieh Shang-Chien |

| May 18, 2025 Regular #126 | Taoyuan Taiwan Beer Leopards | 104–85 | Formosa Dreamers | Taichung City |
| 17:00 (UTC+8) | Scoring by quarter: 33–21, 24–30, 21–22, 26–12 |
| | Pts: Williams 25; Rebs: Mockevičius 14; Asts: Kromah 15 | boxscore | Pts: Chiang Yu-An 23; Rebs: Lončar 14; Asts: Chiang Yu-An 4 | Arena: Taichung Intercontinental Basketball Stadium; Attendance: 2,368; Referees: Chen Hung-Ming, Yeh Chun-Hung, Lo Kuo-Hsien |

== Awards ==
=== Yearly awards ===
2024–25 TPBL awards
| Award | | Recipient | Team | Ref. |
|---|---|---|---|---|
| Most Valuable Player | | Jeremy Lin | New Taipei Kings | |
| Most Valuable Import | | Jason Washburn | New Taipei Kings | |
| Defensive Player of the Year | | Brandon Gilbeck | Formosa Dreamers | |
| Rookie of the Year | | Samuel Manu | Taipei Taishin Mars | |
| Sixth Man of the Year | | Yu Huan-Ya | Kaohsiung Aquas | |
| Most Improved Player | | Su Wen-Ju | Kaohsiung Aquas | |
| Most Popular Player of the Year | | Gao Jin-Wei | Taoyuan Taiwan Beer Leopards | |
| Coach of the Year | | Ryan Marchand | New Taipei Kings | |
| General Manager of the Year | | James Mao | New Taipei Kings | |
| Home-Court of the Year | | Hsinchu Toplus Lioneers | | |
| Cheerleading Team of the Year | | Passion Sisters | New Taipei CTBC DEA | |
| Most Popular Cheerleader of the Year | | Aviva | Taishin Wonders | |
| Plays of the Year | Clutch Play of the Year | Jeremy Lin | New Taipei Kings | |
| Plays of the Year | Dunk of the Year | Li Ruei-Ci | New Taipei CTBC DEA | |
| Plays of the Year | Assist of the Year | Lin Chin-Pang | New Taipei Kings | |
| Plays of the Year | Block of the Year | Gao Jin-Wei | Taoyuan Taiwan Beer Leopards | |

- All-TPBL First Team:
  - Jason Washburn (New Taipei Kings)
  - Lasan Kromah (Taoyuan Taiwan Beer Leopards)
  - Ma Chien-Hao (Formosa Dreamers)
  - Jeremy Lin (New Taipei Kings)
  - Gao Jin-Wei (Taoyuan Taiwan Beer Leopards)
- All-TPBL Second Team:
  - Brandon Gilbeck (Formosa Dreamers)
  - Kenny Manigault (New Taipei Kings)
  - Joseph Lin (New Taipei Kings)
  - Lin Chun-Chi (Formosa Dreamers)
  - Su Wen-Ju (Kaohsiung Aquas)

- All-Defensive First Team:
  - Brandon Gilbeck (Formosa Dreamers)
  - Kenny Manigault (New Taipei Kings)
  - Jeremy Lin (New Taipei Kings)
  - Su Wen-Ju (Kaohsiung Aquas)
  - Gao Jin-Wei (Taoyuan Taiwan Beer Leopards)
- All-Defensive Second Team:
  - Lasan Kromah (Taoyuan Taiwan Beer Leopards)
  - Malcolm Miller (Taipei Taishin Mars)
  - Samuel Manu (Taipei Taishin Mars)
  - Wei Chia-Hao (New Taipei CTBC DEA)
  - Hsieh Ya-Hsuan (New Taipei CTBC DEA)

=== Statistical awards ===
2024–25 TPBL statistical awards
| Award | Recipient | Team | Statistic | Ref. |
|---|---|---|---|---|
| Points Leader | Lasan Kromah | Taoyuan Taiwan Beer Leopards | 23.3 | |
| Rebounds Leader | Devin Williams | Taoyuan Taiwan Beer Leopards | 12.7 | |
| Assists Leader | Gao Jin-Wei | Taoyuan Taiwan Beer Leopards | 6.4 | |
| Steals Leader | Lasan Kromah | Taoyuan Taiwan Beer Leopards | 2.8 | |
| Blocks Leader | Brandon Gilbeck | Formosa Dreamers | 3.2 | |

=== Player of the Week ===
| Week | Recipient | Team | Ref. |
|---|---|---|---|
| 1 | Lin Chun-Chi | Formosa Dreamers | |
| 2 | Joseph Lin | New Taipei Kings | |
| 3 | Aric Holman | Formosa Dreamers | |
| 4 | Ma Chien-Hao | Formosa Dreamers | |
| 5 | Kaleb Wesson | Kaohsiung Aquas | |
| 6 | Jason Washburn | New Taipei Kings | |
| 7 | Douglas Creighton | Formosa Dreamers | |
| 8 | Chen Huai-An | Kaohsiung Aquas | |
| 9 | Jason Washburn | New Taipei Kings | |
| 10 | Lasan Kromah | Taoyuan Taiwan Beer Leopards | |
| 11 | Aric Holman | Formosa Dreamers | |
| 12 | Landers Nolley | Hsinchu Toplus Lioneers | |
| 14 | Lasan Kromah | Taoyuan Taiwan Beer Leopards | |
| 15 | Daron Russell | New Taipei CTBC DEA | |
| 16 | Marko Todorović | New Taipei CTBC DEA | |
| 17 | Landers Nolley | Hsinchu Toplus Lioneers | |
| 18 | Jeremy Lin | New Taipei Kings | |
| 19 | Malcolm Miller | Taipei Taishin Mars | |
| 20 | Jeremy Lin | New Taipei Kings | |
| 21 | Lasan Kromah | Taoyuan Taiwan Beer Leopards | |
| 22 | Chiu Tzu-Hsuan | Kaohsiung Aquas | |
| 23 | Kaleb Wesson | Kaohsiung Aquas | |
| 24 | Ma Chien-Hao | Formosa Dreamers | |
| 25 | Landers Nolley | Hsinchu Toplus Lioneers | |
| 26 | Lasan Kromah | Taoyuan Taiwan Beer Leopards | |

=== Player of the Month ===
| Month | Local player | | Import player | | Ref. |
| Month | Recipient | Team | Recipient | Team | Ref. |
2024
| October & November | Jeremy Lin | New Taipei Kings | Kaleb Wesson | Kaohsiung Aquas | |
| December | Gao Jin-Wei | Taoyuan Taiwan Beer Leopards | Jason Washburn | New Taipei Kings | |
2025
| January & February | Gao Jin-Wei | Taoyuan Taiwan Beer Leopards | Landers Nolley | Hsinchu Toplus Lioneers | |
| March | Jeremy Lin | New Taipei Kings | Daron Russell | New Taipei CTBC DEA | |
| April | Jeremy Lin | New Taipei Kings | Kaleb Wesson | Kaohsiung Aquas | |
| May | Jeremy Lin | New Taipei Kings | Lasan Kromah | Taoyuan Taiwan Beer Leopards | |

== See also ==
- 2024–25 Formosa Dreamers season
- 2024–25 Hsinchu Toplus Lioneers season
- 2024–25 Kaohsiung Aquas season
- 2024–25 New Taipei CTBC DEA season
- 2024–25 New Taipei Kings season
- 2024–25 Taipei Taishin Mars season
- 2024–25 Taoyuan Taiwan Beer Leopards season
