= 2024–25 TPBL season =

1st TPBL season

- League: Taiwan Professional Basketball League
- Sport: Basketball
- Duration: October 19, 2024 – May 18, 2025 (regular season); May 23 – 25, 2025 (play-in); May 29 – June 8, 2025 (semifinals); June 16 – 29, 2025 (finals)
- Games: 36 per team
- Teams: 7
- TV partner(s): VL Sports, MOMOTV, DAZN, Sportcast

Draft
- Top draft pick: Samuel Manu
- Picked by: Taipei Taishin Mars

Regular season
- Top seed: New Taipei Kings
- Season MVP: Jeremy Lin (Kings)
- Top scorer: Lasan Kromah (Leopards)

Playoffs

Finals
- Champions: New Taipei Kings
- Runners-up: Kaohsiung Aquas
- Finals MVP: Jeremy Lin (Kings)

Taiwan Professional Basketball League seasons
- 2025–26 →

The 2024–25 TPBL season was the first season of the Taiwan Professional Basketball League (TPBL), with the Formosa Dreamers, Hsinchu Toplus Lioneers, Kaohsiung Aquas, New Taipei CTBC DEA, New Taipei Kings, Taipei Taishin Mars, and the Taoyuan Taiwan Beer Leopards participating in this competition. The regular season started on October 19, 2024 and ended on May 18, 2025. The play-in series started on May 23 and ended on May 25. The semifinals series started on May 29 and ended on June 8. The finals series started on June 16 and ended on June 29. On June 29, the New Taipei Kings defeated the Kaohsiung Aquas, 4–3, winning the 2024–25 season championship.

== Teams ==
Team	Chinese name	Location	Arena	Map
Formosa Dreamers	福爾摩沙夢想家	Taichung City	Taichung Intercontinental Basketball Stadium	2024–25 TPBL season is located in Taiwan
Hsinchu Toplus Lioneers	新竹御嵿攻城獅	Hsinchu County	Hsinchu County Stadium	2024–25 TPBL season is located in Taiwan
Kaohsiung Aquas	高雄全家海神	Kaohsiung City	Kaohsiung Arena	2024–25 TPBL season is located in Taiwan
New Taipei CTBC DEA	新北中信特攻	New Taipei City	Xinzhuang Gymnasium	2024–25 TPBL season is located in Taiwan
New Taipei Kings	新北國王	New Taipei City	Xinzhuang Gymnasium	2024–25 TPBL season is located in Taiwan
Taipei Taishin Mars	臺北台新戰神	Taipei City	Taipei Heping Basketball Gymnasium; Hsinchu County Stadium (Note: Home game of the play-in.)	2024–25 TPBL season is located in Taiwan
Taoyuan Taiwan Beer Leopards	桃園台啤永豐雲豹	Taoyuan City	Taoyuan Arena	2024–25 TPBL season is located in Taiwan

== Season format ==
- Each team plays against another six times, three at home and three on the road, respectively. Each team plays 36 matches total in the regular season.
- Play-in series: Best-of-three series. The series are contested by the teams that finished the regular season as the fourth seed and fifth seed. The fourth seed is awarded a one-win advantage. The winner can qualify to the semifinals series.
- Semifinals series: Best-of-seven series. Matchup is decided by seeding in regular season. The first seed plays against the winner of play-in series, and the second seed plays against the third seed. The winners can qualify for the finals series.
- Finals series: Best-of-seven series. The series are contested by the winners of semifinals series.

== Import players restrictions ==
- Each team is able to register 3 to 4 import players, 1 foreign student player or Asian import player, and 2 heritage players.
1. Each team can sign a foreign student player with the contract until 2025–26 season. The eligibility of the foreign student player is same as import player. Players with original foreign student player contract can play as local player until 2025–26 season.
2. The teams represented the league at the East Asia Super League can register 1 Asian import player. The eligibility of the Asian import player is same as foreign student player.
- Each team is able to register 1 naturalised player as local player when naturalised player stayed in the same team for three years after finishing naturalisation.
- Each team is able to select 2 to 3 import players into active roster in each match.
- 8-Imports-In-4-Quarters Rule: each quarter can have 2 import players on the court.

== Import and heritage players ==
Team	Import players	Heritage players	Former players
Formosa Dreamers	(United States) (Taiwan) Brandon Gilbeck (United States) Aric Holman (United States) Beau Beech (Bosnia and Herzegovina) (Croatia) Markus Lončar	(United States) (Taiwan) Randall Walko	(Serbia) (Canada) Stefan Janković (United States) A.J. Pacher (Canada) Anthony Bennett
Hsinchu Toplus Lioneers	(United States) Earl Clark (United States) Kennedy Meeks (United States) Landers Nolley (United States) Nate Laszewski	—N/a	(Croatia) Matej Radunič (United States) Julian Gamble (United States) (Jordan) Dar Tucker (United States) Michael Holyfield
Kaohsiung Aquas	(United States) (Italy) Anthony Morse (United States) Kaleb Wesson (Lithuania) Edgaras Želionis (United States) Craig Sword	—N/a	(Philippines) (United States) Jason Brickman (Netherlands) Terrence Bieshaar (United States) Arnett Moultrie
New Taipei CTBC DEA	(Croatia) Kristijan Krajina (United States) Nysier Brooks (United States Virgin Islands) (Puerto Rico) Ivan Aska (United States) Daron Russell	—N/a	(United States) Chevez Goodwin (United States) James Eads (United States) Raynere Thornton (United States) Bryan Griffin (United States) (Georgia (country)) Conner Frankamp (United States) Tevin Mack (Montenegro) Marko Todorović
New Taipei Kings	(United States) Austin Daye (United States) (Bulgaria) Jason Washburn (United States) Kenny Manigault (Palestine) Sani Sakakini (AI)	(United States) (Taiwan) Joseph Lin (United States) (Taiwan) Jeremy Lin	(United States) Chris Johnson
Taipei Taishin Mars	(United States) Malcolm Miller (United States) Ray McCallum (Nigeria) Micheal Eric (France) Adrien Moerman	(United States) (Taiwan) Kenneth Chien	(United States) (United Kingdom) Byron Mullens (Ukraine) Ihor Zaytsev (United States) Devin Oliver (United States) (Lebanon) Thomas Robinson (Haiti) (United States) Jeantal Cylla
Taoyuan Taiwan Beer Leopards	(Liberia) (United States) Lasan Kromah (United States) Devin Williams (Lithuania) Egidijus Mockevičius (France) Axel Toupane	—N/a	(United States) Larry Sanders (United States) Robert Upshaw (United States) Mitchell Smith (Guam) (United States) Earnest Ross

(AI): Asian import players

== Transactions ==
=== Draft ===
The 2024 TPBL draft was held on July 23, 2024, at Grand Hilai Taipei in Taipei City.

=== Coaching changes ===
Coaching changes
Team	2023–24 season	2024–25 season
Off-season
Kaohsiung Aquas	Brendan Joyce	Mathias Fischer
Taipei Taishin Mars	Hsu Hao-Cheng (interim)	Hsu Hao-Cheng
In-season
Hsinchu Toplus Lioneers	Milan Mitrovic	Seng Hsin-Han (interim)
Hsinchu Toplus Lioneers	Seng Hsin-Han (interim)	Wesam Al-Sous

==== Off-season ====
- On May 23, 2024, the Kaohsiung Aquas announced that Brendan Joyce left the team.
- On July 10, 2024, the Kaohsiung Aquas hired Mathias Fischer as their new head coach.
- On August 28, 2024, the Taipei Taishin Mars interim head coach, Hsu Hao-Cheng was promoted to the new head coach.

==== In-season ====
- On December 6, 2024, the Hsinchu Toplus Lioneers announced to terminate contract relationship with Milan Mitrovic, and named Seng Hsin-Han, the Hsinchu Toplus Lioneers assistant coach, as their interim head coach.
- On December 17, 2024, the Hsinchu Toplus Lioneers hired Wesam Al-Sous as their new head coach.

== 2024 interleague play ==
Seven teams participated as a united team named RISE BEYOND in these invitational games.

=== Standings ===
Pos	Team	Pld	W	L	PCT	GB
1	University of the Philippines	7	7	0	1.000	—
2	Taiwan Beer	7	5	2	.714	2
3	Asian University Basketball Team	7	5	2	.714	2
4	Changhua BLL	7	4	3	.571	3
5	RISE BEYOND	7	3	4	.429	4
6	Bank of Taiwan	7	3	4	.429	4
7	Chinese Taipei NEXT	7	1	6	.143	6
8	Bangkok University	7	0	7	.000	7

Source: Official website

=== Game log ===
August 24, 2024	RISE BEYOND	61–68	Taiwan Beer	Keelung City
15:00 (UTC+8)	Scoring by quarter: 9–18, 15–20, 19–13, 18–17
	Pts: Wei Liang-Che 18; Rebs: Chiang Chun 12; Asts: Chiang Chun, Wang Chen-Yuan 3	boxscore	Pts: Chu I-Tsung 18; Rebs: Joof Alasan 12; Asts: Lu Zong-Lin, Lu Chieh-Min 5	Arena: Keelung Municipal Stadium

August 25, 2024	Bank of Taiwan	54–83	RISE BEYOND	Keelung City
15:00 (UTC+8)	Scoring by quarter: 10–21, 19–15, 16–26, 9–21
	Pts: Lin Jhe-Ting 11; Rebs: Wang Yung-Cheng 6 Asts: Lin Jhe-Ting 4	boxscore	Pts: Chiang Chun 19; Rebs: Chen Chun-Nan 9 Asts: Wei Liang-Che 5	Arena: Keelung Municipal Stadium

August 26, 2024	RISE BEYOND	45–84	University of the Philippines	Keelung City
13:00 (UTC+8)	Scoring by quarter: 12–19, 7–21, 15–30, 11–14
	Pts: Wei Liang-Che 10; Rebs: Chiang Chun, Chin Ming-Ching 4 Asts: Wei Liang-Che 3	boxscore	Pts: Francis Leo Lopez 14; Rebs: Jalen Isagani Stevens 16; Asts: Reyland Torres 6	Arena: Keelung Municipal Stadium

August 27, 2024	Bangkok University	78–85(OT)	RISE BEYOND	Keelung City
13:00 (UTC+8)	Scoring by quarter: 17–24, 23–27, 16–11, 17–11, Overtime: 5–12
	Pts: Suphakit Thitikhunrat 17; Rebs: Sebastine Chizoba Oguejiofor 16; Asts: Panudet Kularptip 12	boxscore	Pts: Wei Liang-Che 25; Rebs: Chiang Chun 12; Asts: Wang Yung-Cheng 6	Arena: Keelung Municipal Stadium

August 29, 2024	Chinese Taipei NEXT	77–85	RISE BEYOND	Keelung City
19:00 (UTC+8)	Scoring by quarter: 27–29, 8–15, 17–17, 25–24
	Pts: Lin Wei-Kai 18; Rebs: Tseng Hsin-Wu 7 Asts: Wang Wei-Hsiang 10	boxscore	Pts: Su Pei-Kai 16; Rebs: Chiang Chun, Iong Ngai-San 7 Asts: three players 3	Arena: Keelung Municipal Stadium

August 30, 2024	RISE BEYOND	60–78	Asian University Basketball Team	Keelung City
17:00 (UTC+8)	Scoring by quarter: 24–21, 9–19, 14–17, 13–21
	Pts: Chiang Chun 15; Rebs: Chiang Chun 10; Asts: Wei Liang-Che 3	boxscore	Pts: Liu Cheng-Hsun 22; Rebs: Liu Cheng-Hsun 9 Asts: Sung Hsin-Hao 7	Arena: Keelung Municipal Stadium

August 31, 2024	RISE BEYOND	53–63	Changhua BLL	Keelung City
15:00 (UTC+8)	Scoring by quarter: 12–18, 13–20, 17–10, 11–15
	Pts: Wang Chen-Yuan 10; Rebs: Shih Cheng-Ping 9 Asts: Chiang Kuang-Chien 4	boxscore	Pts: Lin Li, Sugar-Ochir Erdenetsetseg 11; Rebs: Chang Wei-Hsiang 10; Asts: Lin Li 5	Arena: Keelung Municipal Stadium

== Preseason ==
The Taiwan Professional Basketball League held the preseason games with the Formosa Dreamers at the Taichung Intercontinental Basketball Stadium on October 5 and 6, 2024. And the Taiwan Professional Basketball League held the preseason games at the Hsinchu County Stadium on October 12 and 13.

=== Game log ===
October 5, 2024 Preseason #01	Taoyuan Taiwan Beer Leopards	92–90	Taipei Taishin Mars	Taichung City
14:30 (UTC+8)	Scoring by quarter: 26–29, 19–22, 16–24, 31–15
	Pts: Kromah 40; Rebs: Ting Kuang-Hao, Sanders 13; Asts: Kromah 7	boxscore	Pts: Oliver 20; Rebs: Miller 11; Asts: three players 4	Arena: Taichung Intercontinental Basketball Stadium; Attendance: 2,100; Referees: Chen Chao-Hung, Lai Chien-Hao, Chen Chien-Lin

October 5, 2024 Preseason #02	New Taipei CTBC DEA	94–107	Formosa Dreamers	Taichung City
17:00 (UTC+8)	Scoring by quarter: 30–30, 10–27, 29–22, 25–28
	Pts: Shih Chin-Yao 17; Rebs: Griffin 8 Asts: Wei Chia-Hao, Eads 5	boxscore	Pts: Beech 37; Rebs: Beech 14; Asts: Lin Chun-Chi 6	Arena: Taichung Intercontinental Basketball Stadium; Attendance: 2,100; Referees: Yeh Chun-Hung, Lo Kuo-Hsien, Huang Po-Wei

October 6, 2024 Preseason #03	Kaohsiung Aquas	102–78	Hsinchu Toplus Lioneers	Taichung City
14:30 (UTC+8)	Scoring by quarter: 33–26, 21–25, 23–12, 25–15
	Pts: Wu Siao-Jin 20; Rebs: Wesson 10; Asts: Brickman 8	boxscore	Pts: Kao Kuo-Hao 12; Rebs: Radunič 9 Asts: four players 2	Arena: Taichung Intercontinental Basketball Stadium; Attendance: 2,807; Referees: Lin Chien-Hung, Hsieh Shang-Chien, Hsu Wei-Kai

October 6, 2024 Preseason #04	New Taipei Kings	81–99	Formosa Dreamers	Taichung City
17:00 (UTC+8)	Scoring by quarter: 24–26, 24–24, 21–22, 12–27
	Pts: Johnson 21; Rebs: Johnson 13; Asts: Su Shih-Hsuan, Jo. Lin 5	boxscore	Pts: Holman 34; Rebs: Holman 13; Asts: Chang Tsung-Hsien, Lin Chun-Chi 3	Arena: Taichung Intercontinental Basketball Stadium; Attendance: 2,807; Referees: Chen Hung-Ming, Huang Chen-Feng, Ou Yang Yu-Hsien

October 12, 2024 Preseason #05	Formosa Dreamers	93–118	Kaohsiung Aquas	Hsinchu County
14:30 (UTC+8)	Scoring by quarter: 27–28, 20–34, 18–31, 28–25
	Pts: Beech 24; Rebs: Ma Chien-Hao 6 Asts: Lu Kuan-Liang 3	boxscore	Pts: Morse 22; Rebs: Wesson 12; Asts: Chen Huai-An 7	Arena: Hsinchu County Stadium; Attendance: 3,169; Referees: Chen Chao-Hung, Lai Chien-Hao, Chen Ching-Hsiang

October 12, 2024 Preseason #06	Taipei Taishin Mars	108–111	Hsinchu Toplus Lioneers	Hsinchu County
17:00 (UTC+8)	Scoring by quarter: 38–28, 17–30, 26–22, 27–31
	Pts: Oliver 25; Rebs: Ting Sheng-Ju 7 Asts: Ting Sheng-Ju 11	boxscore	Pts: Clark 21; Rebs: Meeks 15; Asts: Kao Kuo-Hao 6	Arena: Hsinchu County Stadium; Attendance: 3,169; Referees: Yeh Chun-Hung, Yang Shih-Hsien, Huang Shao-Po

October 13, 2024 Preseason #07	New Taipei CTBC DEA	85–77	New Taipei Kings	Hsinchu County
14:30 (UTC+8)	Scoring by quarter: 13–17, 28–17, 21–35, 23–8
	Pts: Griffin 24; Rebs: Griffin 15; Asts: Thornton 9	boxscore	Pts: Lee Kai-Yan 17; Rebs: Johnson 13; Asts: Lee Kai-Yan 4	Arena: Hsinchu County Stadium; Attendance: 3,668; Referees: Hsieh Wen-Wei, Sung Ming-Lu, Wu Fang-Shan

October 13, 2024 Preseason #08	Taoyuan Taiwan Beer Leopards	99–98	Hsinchu Toplus Lioneers	Hsinchu County
17:00 (UTC+8)	Scoring by quarter: 28–35, 19–29, 28–17, 24–17
	Pts: Gao Jin-Wei 33; Rebs: Upshaw 10; Asts: Gao Jin-Wei 10	boxscore	Pts: Meeks 18; Rebs: Radunič 12; Asts: Tseng Po-Yu 5	Arena: Hsinchu County Stadium; Attendance: 3,668; Referees: Chen Hung-Ming, Peng Shih-Hsuan, Tsung Hsiu-Hui

== Regular season ==
The regular season started on October 19, 2024 and ended on May 18, 2025. On October 19, the 2024–25 season opening game, matched by the New Taipei CTBC DEA and the Formosa Dreamers, was played at Taichung Intercontinental Basketball Stadium.

=== League table ===
Pos	Team	Pld	W	L	PCT	GB	Qualification
1	New Taipei Kings	36	26	10	.722	—	Advance to semifinals
2	Formosa Dreamers	36	21	15	.583	5	Advance to semifinals
3	Kaohsiung Aquas	36	19	17	.528	7	Advance to semifinals
4	Taipei Taishin Mars	36	16	20	.444	10	Advance to play-in
5	Taoyuan Taiwan Beer Leopards	36	16	20	.444	10	Advance to play-in
6	New Taipei CTBC DEA	36	16	20	.444	10	
7	Hsinchu Toplus Lioneers	36	12	24	.333	14	

Source: TPBL

=== Results ===
Home \ Away	MARS	DEA	KINGS	LEOPARDS	LIONEERS	DREAMERS	AQUAS
Taipei Taishin Mars	—	98–91	89–102	78–82	76–79	107–123	100–90
Taipei Taishin Mars	—	89–85*	106–100	97–85	100–90	103–118	80–99
Taipei Taishin Mars	—	72–69	107–83	97–88	117–98	72–66	76–96
New Taipei CTBC DEA	76–85	—	61–79	70–88	85–84	82–89	107–97
New Taipei CTBC DEA	105–82	—	98–100	95–89	78–93	88–81	85–79
New Taipei CTBC DEA	96–89	—	79–111	76–95	103–101*	95–113	78–87
New Taipei Kings	114–87	98–99	—	108–97	122–93	88–81	111–108**
New Taipei Kings	112–96	96–79	—	68–87	96–78	121–89	111–91
New Taipei Kings	102–97	121–76	—	117–84	111–100	95–101	106–92
Taoyuan Taiwan Beer Leopards	74–95	86–87*	100–84	—	112–89	92–90	94–106*
Taoyuan Taiwan Beer Leopards	100–97	106–116	99–102	—	98–82	96–93	107–103
Taoyuan Taiwan Beer Leopards	86–89	85–77	109–114	—	95–83	95–110	75–103
Hsinchu Toplus Lioneers	84–94	91–97	89–98	99–73	—	106–99	97–91
Hsinchu Toplus Lioneers	117–105	75–83	106–114	102–106	—	107–90	116–103
Hsinchu Toplus Lioneers	103–92	91–97	111–114	94–77	—	106–79	118–99
Formosa Dreamers	105–85	88–74	87–76	111–117*	96–81	—	99–90
Formosa Dreamers	69–86	92–80	112–79	110–102	110–105	—	101–87
Formosa Dreamers	97–95	75–98	115–78	85–104	99–89	—	104–101
Kaohsiung Aquas	88–71	72–88	78–88	88–87	93–79	84–97	—
Kaohsiung Aquas	102–94	104–91	78–107	95–87	103–78	105–95	—
Kaohsiung Aquas	98–76	91–80*	97–83	105–95	104–88	109–95	—

Source: TPBL
Legend: Blue = home team win; Red = away team win.

=== Rescheduled games ===
- Four New Taipei Kings home games (against the Kaohsiung Aquas on March 19, against the Taipei Taishin Mars on May 3, against the New Taipei CTBC DEA on May 4, and against the Taoyuan Taiwan Beer Leopards on May 7) were rescheduled to April 2, May 9, 3, and 8 due to the 2025 FIBA Asia Cup qualification and 2025 Basketball Champions League Asia – East.

== Playoffs ==
- Play-in series: The fourth and fifth seeds play the best-of-three play-in series. The fourth seed will be awarded a one-win advantage. The winner can qualify the semifinals series.
- Semifinals series: The winner of play-in series and the top three seeds play the best-of-seven semifinals series. The winners can qualify the finals series.
- Finals series: The winners of the semifinals series play the best-of-seven finals series.

=== Bracket ===
Play-in
4	**Taipei Taishin Mars**	**2**
5	Taoyuan Taiwan Beer Leopards	1

Semifinals
1	**New Taipei Kings**	**4**
4	Taipei Taishin Mars	0
2	Formosa Dreamers	1
3	**Kaohsiung Aquas**	**4**

Finals
1	**New Taipei Kings**	**4**
3	Kaohsiung Aquas	3

Bold: Series winner
Italic: Team with home-court advantage

== Statistics ==
=== Individual statistic leaders ===
Category	Player	Team	Statistic
Points per game	Lasan Kromah	Taoyuan Taiwan Beer Leopards	23.3
Rebounds per game	Devin Williams	Taoyuan Taiwan Beer Leopards	12.7
Assists per game	Gao Jin-Wei	Taoyuan Taiwan Beer Leopards	6.4
Steals per game	Lasan Kromah	Taoyuan Taiwan Beer Leopards	2.8
Blocks per game	Brandon Gilbeck	Formosa Dreamers	3.2
Turnovers per game	Lasan Kromah	Taoyuan Taiwan Beer Leopards	4.5
Fouls per game	Brandon Gilbeck	Formosa Dreamers	4.5
Minutes per game	Gao Jin-Wei	Taoyuan Taiwan Beer Leopards	40:01
FG%	Jason Washburn	New Taipei Kings	56.4%
3P%	Lin Chun-Chi	Formosa Dreamers	42.1%
FT%	Lin Chun-Chi	Formosa Dreamers	84.1%

=== Individual game highs ===
Category	Player	Team	Statistic
Points	Landers Nolley	Hsinchu Toplus Lioneers	44
Rebounds	Devin Williams	Taoyuan Taiwan Beer Leopards	23
Assists	Lasan Kromah	Taoyuan Taiwan Beer Leopards	15
Steals	Lasan Kromah	Taoyuan Taiwan Beer Leopards	9
Blocks	Brandon Gilbeck	Formosa Dreamers	8
Turnovers	Markus Lončar	Formosa Dreamers	10
Three pointers	Hsieh Ya-Hsuan	New Taipei CTBC DEA	8

=== Team statistic leaders ===
Category	Team	Statistic
Points per game	New Taipei Kings	100.3
Rebounds per game	New Taipei Kings	53.4
Assists per game	New Taipei Kings	23.5
Steals per game	Kaohsiung Aquas	10.7
Blocks per game	Formosa Dreamers	4.9
Turnovers per game	Formosa Dreamers	18.4
Fouls per game	Kaohsiung Aquas	23.7
FG%	New Taipei Kings	44.0%
3P%	New Taipei Kings	31.8%
FT%	Formosa Dreamers	70.1%

== Awards ==
=== Yearly awards ===
2024–25 TPBL awards
Award		Recipient	Team	Ref.
Most Valuable Player		Jeremy Lin	New Taipei Kings	
Most Valuable Import		Jason Washburn	New Taipei Kings	
Defensive Player of the Year		Brandon Gilbeck	Formosa Dreamers	
Rookie of the Year		Samuel Manu	Taipei Taishin Mars	
Sixth Man of the Year		Yu Huan-Ya	Kaohsiung Aquas	
Most Improved Player		Su Wen-Ju	Kaohsiung Aquas	
Most Popular Player of the Year		Gao Jin-Wei	Taoyuan Taiwan Beer Leopards	
Coach of the Year		Ryan Marchand	New Taipei Kings	
General Manager of the Year		James Mao	New Taipei Kings	
Home-Court of the Year		Hsinchu Toplus Lioneers		
Cheerleading Team of the Year		Passion Sisters	New Taipei CTBC DEA	
Most Popular Cheerleader of the Year		Aviva	Taishin Wonders	
Plays of the Year	Clutch Play of the Year	Jeremy Lin	New Taipei Kings	
Plays of the Year	Dunk of the Year	Li Ruei-Ci	New Taipei CTBC DEA	
Plays of the Year	Assist of the Year	Lin Chin-Pang	New Taipei Kings	
Plays of the Year	Block of the Year	Gao Jin-Wei	Taoyuan Taiwan Beer Leopards	

- All-TPBL First Team:
  - Jason Washburn (New Taipei Kings)
  - Lasan Kromah (Taoyuan Taiwan Beer Leopards)
  - Ma Chien-Hao (Formosa Dreamers)
  - Jeremy Lin (New Taipei Kings)
  - Gao Jin-Wei (Taoyuan Taiwan Beer Leopards)
- All-TPBL Second Team:
  - Brandon Gilbeck (Formosa Dreamers)
  - Kenny Manigault (New Taipei Kings)
  - Joseph Lin (New Taipei Kings)
  - Lin Chun-Chi (Formosa Dreamers)
  - Su Wen-Ju (Kaohsiung Aquas)

- All-Defensive First Team:
  - Brandon Gilbeck (Formosa Dreamers)
  - Kenny Manigault (New Taipei Kings)
  - Jeremy Lin (New Taipei Kings)
  - Su Wen-Ju (Kaohsiung Aquas)
  - Gao Jin-Wei (Taoyuan Taiwan Beer Leopards)
- All-Defensive Second Team:
  - Lasan Kromah (Taoyuan Taiwan Beer Leopards)
  - Malcolm Miller (Taipei Taishin Mars)
  - Samuel Manu (Taipei Taishin Mars)
  - Wei Chia-Hao (New Taipei CTBC DEA)
  - Hsieh Ya-Hsuan (New Taipei CTBC DEA)

=== Statistical awards ===
2024–25 TPBL statistical awards
Award	Recipient	Team	Statistic	Ref.
Points Leader	Lasan Kromah	Taoyuan Taiwan Beer Leopards	23.3	
Rebounds Leader	Devin Williams	Taoyuan Taiwan Beer Leopards	12.7	
Assists Leader	Gao Jin-Wei	Taoyuan Taiwan Beer Leopards	6.4	
Steals Leader	Lasan Kromah	Taoyuan Taiwan Beer Leopards	2.8	
Blocks Leader	Brandon Gilbeck	Formosa Dreamers	3.2	

=== Finals awards ===
2025 TPBL Finals awards
Award	Recipient	Team	Ref.
Champion	New Taipei Kings		
Finals MVP	Jeremy Lin	New Taipei Kings	

=== Player of the Week ===
Week	Recipient	Team	Ref.
1	Lin Chun-Chi	Formosa Dreamers	
2	Joseph Lin	New Taipei Kings	
3	Aric Holman	Formosa Dreamers	
4	Ma Chien-Hao	Formosa Dreamers	
5	Kaleb Wesson	Kaohsiung Aquas	
6	Jason Washburn	New Taipei Kings	
7	Douglas Creighton	Formosa Dreamers	
8	Chen Huai-An	Kaohsiung Aquas	
9	Jason Washburn	New Taipei Kings	
10	Lasan Kromah	Taoyuan Taiwan Beer Leopards	
11	Aric Holman	Formosa Dreamers	
12	Landers Nolley	Hsinchu Toplus Lioneers	
14	Lasan Kromah	Taoyuan Taiwan Beer Leopards	
15	Daron Russell	New Taipei CTBC DEA	
16	Marko Todorović	New Taipei CTBC DEA	
17	Landers Nolley	Hsinchu Toplus Lioneers	
18	Jeremy Lin	New Taipei Kings	
19	Malcolm Miller	Taipei Taishin Mars	
20	Jeremy Lin	New Taipei Kings	
21	Lasan Kromah	Taoyuan Taiwan Beer Leopards	
22	Chiu Tzu-Hsuan	Kaohsiung Aquas	
23	Kaleb Wesson	Kaohsiung Aquas	
24	Ma Chien-Hao	Formosa Dreamers	
25	Landers Nolley	Hsinchu Toplus Lioneers	
26	Lasan Kromah	Taoyuan Taiwan Beer Leopards	

=== Player of the Month ===
Month	Local player		Import player		Ref.
Month	Recipient	Team	Recipient	Team	Ref.
2024
October & November	Jeremy Lin	New Taipei Kings	Kaleb Wesson	Kaohsiung Aquas	
December	Gao Jin-Wei	Taoyuan Taiwan Beer Leopards	Jason Washburn	New Taipei Kings	
2025
January & February	Gao Jin-Wei	Taoyuan Taiwan Beer Leopards	Landers Nolley	Hsinchu Toplus Lioneers	
March	Jeremy Lin	New Taipei Kings	Daron Russell	New Taipei CTBC DEA	
April	Jeremy Lin	New Taipei Kings	Kaleb Wesson	Kaohsiung Aquas	
May	Jeremy Lin	New Taipei Kings	Lasan Kromah	Taoyuan Taiwan Beer Leopards	

== Arenas ==
- The Taipei Taishin Mars announced that they would play their home game in play-in at the Hsinchu County Stadium.

== Media ==
- The games will be broadcast on television via VL Sports, MOMOTV, DAZN, and Sportcast, and online via YouTube.
- The games will be broadcast on online via AXN Asia since March 22, 2025.

== Notable occurrences ==
- On June 17, 2024, Mohammad Al Bachir Gadiaga, former player of the New Taipei CTBC DEA, signed with the Akita Northern Happinets of the B.League. And he became the first Taiwanese player to join the B.League first division team.
- On July 8, 2024, the Formosa Dreamers traded Ting Kuang-Hao to the Taiwan Beer Leopards for cash considerations. And this trade became the first interleague trade between the teams of the P. League+ and T1 League.
- On July 8, 2024, Chuang Jui-Hsiung was named as the commissioner of the new league.
- On July 9, 2024, the Taipei Taishin Mars, New Taipei Kings, New Taipei CTBC DEA, Taoyuan Taiwan Beer Leopards, Hsinchu Toplus Lioneers, Formosa Dreamers, and the Kaohsiung Aquas announced to join the Taiwan Professional Basketball League (TPBL).
- On July 20, 2024, the first trade (between Formosa Dreamers and Taoyuan Taiwan Beer Leopards) was made in TPBL history. And Yang Shen-Yen became the first player to involve the trade in TPBL history.
- On July 23, 2024, Samuel Manu became the first player of the first overall TPBL draft picks.
- On August 1, 2024, the TPBL announced that Wang Chih-Chun and Yang He-Ping, former secretary general of the T1 League and former chief operating officer of the P. League+, were the deputy secretaries of the league.
- On September 2, 2024, Jeremy Lin, the NBA champion, re-signed with the New Taipei Kings.
- On September 16, 2024, Lu Cheng-Ju of the New Taipei Kings was suspended by the league for 12 games due to the passenger of the drunk driver.
- On September 19, 2024, the TPBL announced that Larry Chi was the secretary general of the league.
- On September 19, 2024, Yeh Chun-Hung became the first full-time referee of the league.
- On October 19, 2024, the game matched by the New Taipei CTBC DEA and the Formosa Dreamers became the first game in TPBL history.
- On October 19, 2024, the first TPBL records were made as below:
  - First score: Shih Chin-Yao (New Taipei CTBC DEA)
  - First rebound: Raynere Thornton (New Taipei CTBC DEA)
  - First assist: Raynere Thornton (New Taipei CTBC DEA)
  - First steal: Bryan Griffin (New Taipei CTBC DEA)
  - First block: Brandon Gilbeck (Formosa Dreamers)
  - First dunk: Beau Beech (Formosa Dreamers)
  - First free throw: Beau Beech (Formosa Dreamers)
  - First foul: Beau Beech (Formosa Dreamers)
- On October 27, 2024, the game matched by the New Taipei CTBC DEA and the New Taipei Kings became the first game of the New Taipei Derby in TPBL history.
- On October 27, 2024, Hsieh Ya-Hsuan of the New Taipei CTBC DEA recorded 1,000 points in his career.
- On October 27, 2024, Hsieh Ya-Hsuan of the New Taipei CTBC DEA recorded 200 three pointers in his career.
- On November 10, 2024, Ting Sheng-Ju of the Taipei Taishin Mars became the first player to record triple-double (with 15 points, 11 rebounds, and 12 assists) in TPBL history.
- On November 22, 2024, the TPBL announced that Jonah Morrison, former player of the New Taipei CTBC DEA, was issued an indefinite suspension.
- On December 1, 2024, the game matched by the Kaohsiung Aquas and the Taoyuan Taiwan Beer Leopards became the first overtime game in TPBL history.
- On December 7, 2024, Devin Williams of the Taoyuan Taiwan Beer Leopards became the first player to record 20-20 (with 20 points and 23 rebounds) in TPBL history.
- On December 11, 2024, Yang Shen-Yen of the Taoyuan Taiwan Beer Leopards became the first player out on loan to Super Basketball League (SBL) in TPBL history.
- On December 22, 2024, Gao Jin-Wei of the Taoyuan Taiwan Beer Leopards recorded 200 assists in his career.
- On December 24, 2024, Anthony Bennett, the 2013 first overall NBA draft pick, signed with the Formosa Dreamers.
- On January 1, 2025, the New Taipei CTBC DEA recorded 10,000 points in franchise history.
- On January 12, 2025, Lasan Kromah of the Taoyuan Taiwan Beer Leopards recorded 1,000 points in Taiwan career.
- On January 22, 2025, the New Taipei Kings were invited to participate in 2025 Basketball Champions League Asia – East (2025 BCL Asia – East).
- On February 4, 2025, Jeremy Lin of the New Taipei Kings was named as the head coach of the team G League in 2025 NBA All-Star Game Rising Stars Challenge.
- On February 8, 2025, the game matched by the New Taipei Kings and the Taoyuan Taiwan Beer Leopards became the first game of the former P. League+ champion and T1 League champion in TPBL history.
- On February 19, 2025, the TPBL announced a 3-year partnership with the WSC Sports.
- On March 2, 2025, the New Taipei CTBC DEA became the first team with three players recorded 30+ points in one game in TPBL history.
- On March 7, 2025, Gao Jin-Wei of the Taoyuan Taiwan Beer Leopards became the first player to award the two straight Player of the Month awards in TPBL history.
- On March 8, 2025, Lin Sin-Kuan of the Taoyuan Taiwan Beer Leopards recorded 500 points in his career.
- On March 12, 2025, Huang Jhen of the Taoyuan Taiwan Beer Leopards recorded 1,500 points in his career.
- On March 21, 2025, the KC Global Media Asia announced a five-year English broadcasting partnership with the TPBL.
- On March 26, 2025, the TPBL announced a sponsorship with the Google Pixel.
- On March 29, 2025, Lasan Kromah of the Taoyuan Taiwan Beer Leopards became the first player to record 500 points in TPBL history.
- On April 5, 2025, Yu Huan-Ya of the Kaohsiung Aquas became the first player to record 300 three pointers in franchise history.
- On April 10, 2025, the TPBL announced a partnership with the ALUXE.
- On April 23, 2025, Gao Jin-Wei of the Taoyuan Taiwan Beer Leopards became the first local player to record 500 points in TPBL history.
- On April 27, 2025, Gao Jin-Wei of the Taoyuan Taiwan Beer Leopards became the first player to record 200 assists in TPBL history.
- On May 3, 2025, Beau Beech of the Formosa Dreamers became the first player to record 100 three pointers in TPBL history.
- On May 18, 2025, Gao Jin-Wei of the Taoyuan Taiwan Beer Leopards became the first local player to record 100 three pointers in TPBL history.
- On May 23, 2025, the game matched by the Taipei Taishin Mars and the Taoyuan Taiwan Beer Leopards became the first play-in game in TPBL history.
- On May 27, 2025, Jeremy Lin of the New Taipei Kings became the first player to award the three straight Player of the Month awards in TPBL history.
- On May 29, 2025, the game matched by the Kaohsiung Aquas and the Formosa Dreamers became the first semifinals game in TPBL history.
- On June 8, 2025, Kaohsiung Aquas became the first team to qualify finals series with lower seed in TPBL history.
- On June 14, 2025, Jeremy Lin of the New Taipei Kings became the first player to award the Most Valuable Player with NBA experience in TPBL history.
- On June 15, 2025, Joseph Lin of the New Taipei Kings acquired the FIBA local player eligibility.
- On June 16, 2025, the game matched by the Kaohsiung Aquas and the New Taipei Kings became the first finals game in TPBL history.
- On June 27, 2025, the game matched by the New Taipei Kings and the Kaohsiung Aquas became the first overtime finals game in TPBL history.
- On June 29, 2025, the New Taipei Kings became the first team to win the championship in TPBL history.

== TPBL team in Asian competition ==
Team	Competition	Progress	Result
New Taipei Kings	East Asia Super League	Group stage Group B	2nd place out of 5 teams (4–2)
New Taipei Kings	East Asia Super League	Final four Semifinals	Loss to (Japan) Hiroshima Dragonflies
New Taipei Kings	East Asia Super League	Final four Third place game	Win vs (Japan) Ryukyu Golden Kings
New Taipei Kings	Basketball Champions League Asia	BCL Asia – East Group stage Group B	2nd place out of 4 teams (4–2)
New Taipei Kings	Basketball Champions League Asia	BCL Asia – East Final four Semifinals	Loss to (Chinese Taipei) Taoyuan Pauian Pilots
New Taipei Kings	Basketball Champions League Asia	BCL Asia – East Final four Third place game	Loss to (Indonesia) Pelita Jaya

== See also ==
EASL

- 2024–25 East Asia Super League

BCL Asia

- 2025 Basketball Champions League Asia – East

TPBL

- 2024–25 Formosa Dreamers season
- 2024–25 Hsinchu Toplus Lioneers season
- 2024–25 Kaohsiung Aquas season
- 2024–25 New Taipei CTBC DEA season
- 2024–25 New Taipei Kings season
- 2024–25 Taipei Taishin Mars season
- 2024–25 Taoyuan Taiwan Beer Leopards season
