= Brandon Gilbeck =

American basketball player (born 1996)

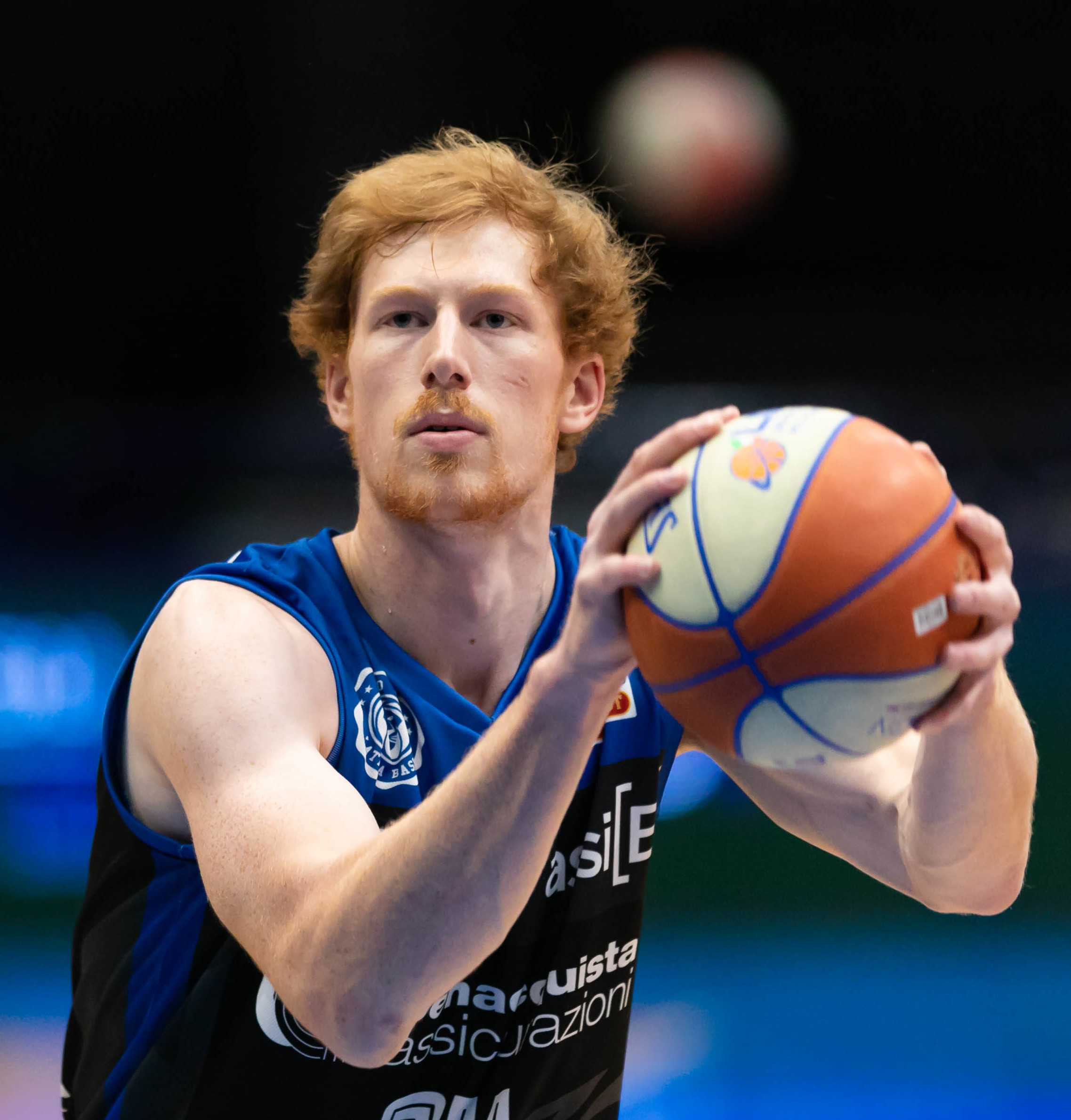
- Gilbeck with Latina in 2021

No. 34 – Formosa Dreamers
- Position: Center
- League: TPBL

Personal information
- Born: December 9, 1996 (age 29) Spring Green, Wisconsin, U.S.
- Listed height: 7 ft 0 in (2.13 m)
- Listed weight: 235 lb (107 kg)

Career information
- High school: River Valley (Spring Green, Wisconsin)
- College: Western Illinois (2015–2019)
- NBA draft: 2019: undrafted
- Playing career: 2019–present

Career history
- 2019–2020: Horsens IC
- 2020–2021: Latina
- 2021–2022: Fraser Valley Bandits
- 2021–present: Formosa Taishin Dreamers / Formosa Dreamers

Career highlights
- TPBL champion (2026); 2× TPBL Defensive Player of the Year (2025, 2026); 2x P. League+ Defensive Player of the Year (2023, 2024); CEBL Defensive Player of the Year (2021); 2× Summit League Defensive Player of the Year (2018, 2019); 2× TPBL All-Defensive First Team (2025, 2026); 2x P. League+ All Defensive Team (2023, 2024); All-TPBL Second Team (2025); P. League+ Second Team (2024); Second-team All-Summit League (2019); 2× TPBL blocks leader (2025, 2026); 3× P. League+ Block Leader (2022–2024); CEBL Blocks Leader (2021); Basketligaen Blocks Leader (2020); NCAA blocks leader (2019)

Brandon Scott Gilbeck (born December 9, 1996) is an American-Taiwanese professional basketball player for the Formosa Dreamers of the Taiwan Professional Basketball League (TPBL). He played college basketball for Western Illinois.

== High school career ==
Gilbeck played basketball for River Valley High School in Spring Green, Wisconsin. As a senior, he averaged 17.4 points, 10.7 rebounds and 3.9 blocks per game. Gilbeck was named Wisconsin Division 5 All-State Honorable Mention and graduated as his school's all-time leader in blocks.

== College career ==
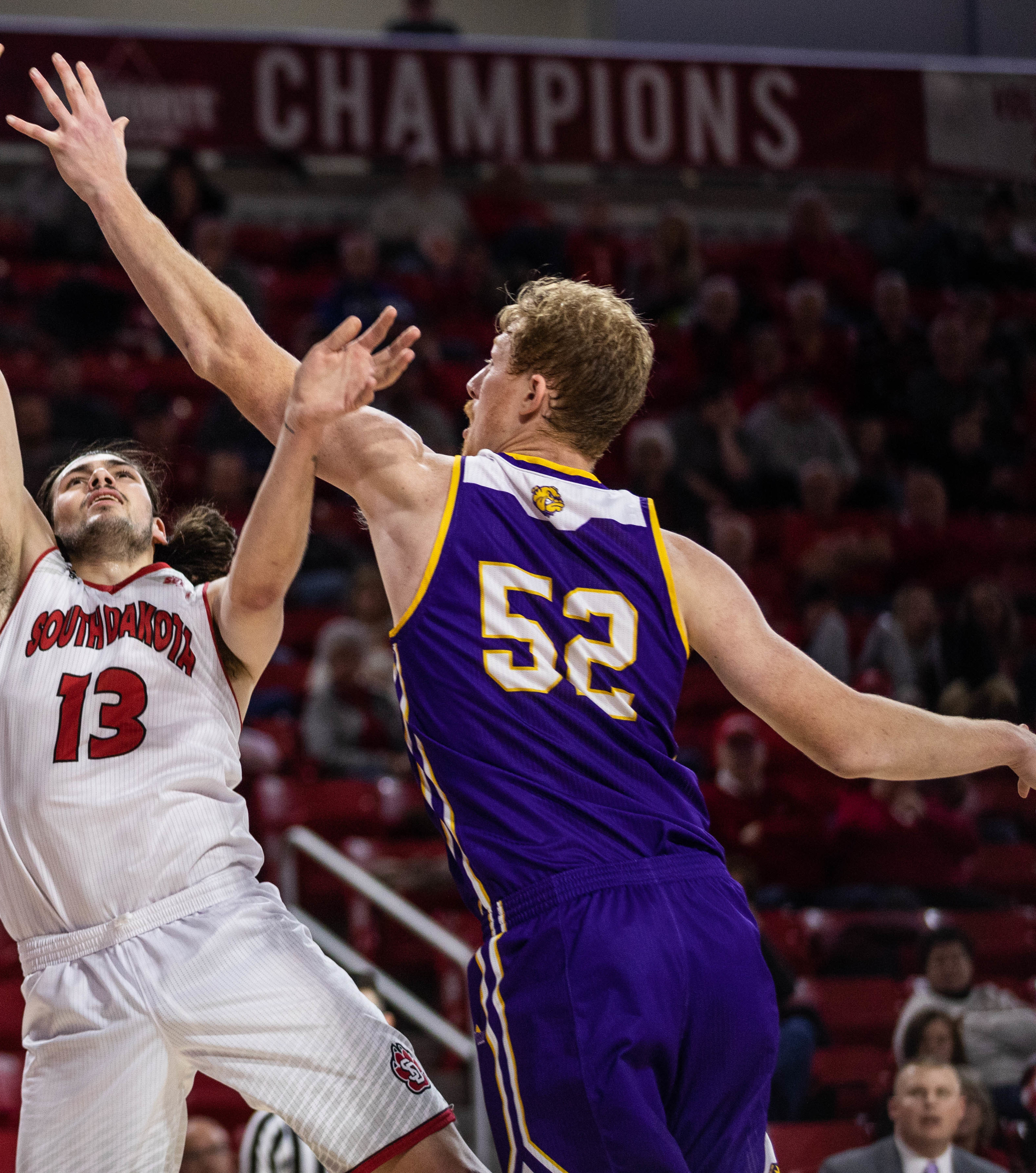
Gilbeck (right) with Western Illinois in 2019

Gilbeck played for Western Illinois for four years. As a sophomore, he set a single-season school record with 85 blocks and ranked fourth in the NCAA Division I with three blocks per game. In his junior season, Gilbeck was named Summit League Defensive Player of the Year and All-Summit League Honorable Mention. He became Western Illinois' all-time leader in blocks. Gilbeck averaged 10.8 points, 7.1 rebounds, and 2.6 blocks per game as a junior. On November 17, 2018, Gilbeck posted nine points and a career-high 19 rebounds in a 68–66 overtime loss to Eastern Illinois. On February 7, 2019, Gilbeck recorded 14 points, 16 rebounds and 10 blocks against Purdue Fort Wayne, the first triple-double in the Summit League since 2007. He averaged 3.42 blocks per game, which led NCAA Division I, repeated as Summit League Defensive Player of the Year and earned Second Team All-Summit League honors. Gilbeck also averaged 9.5 points and 8.5 rebounds per game as a senior.

== Professional career ==
On August 8, 2019, Gilbeck signed his first professional contract with Horsens IC of the Danish Basketligaen. He averaged 9.4 points, 6.7 rebounds and a league-high 2.9 blocks per game before the season was cut short due to the COVID-19 pandemic. On July 30, 2020, Gilbeck signed with Latina Basket of the Italian Serie A2 Basket.

On June 2, 2021, Gilbeck signed with the Fraser Valley Bandits of the Canadian Elite Basketball League. He averaged 14.1 points, 7.7 rebounds, and a league-high 2.8 blocks per game. On August 18, he was named the league Defensive Player of the Year. Gilbeck signed with the Formosa Taishin Dreamers of the P. League+ on September 8.

In July 2024, the Chinese Taipei Basketball Association signed Gilbeck to a naturalized player's contract. Following ratification of the contract by the Taiwanese Ministry of the Interior and the Sports Administration, Gilbeck would be eligible to play for the Chinese Taipei men's national basketball team.

On August 2, 2024, Gilbeck re-signed with the Formosa Dreamers of the Taiwan Professional Basketball League (TPBL). He was the league's blocks leader for the 2024–25 season.

On June 2, 2025, Gilbeck awarded the Defensive Player of the Year and All-Defensive First Team of the TPBL in 2024–25 season. On June 6, Gilbeck was selected to the All-TPBL Second Team in 2024–25 season. On July 16, Gilbeck re-signed with the Formosa Dreamers of the Taiwan Professional Basketball League (TPBL). He was the league's blocks leader for the 2025–26 season.

On May 9, 2026, Gilbeck awarded the Defensive Player of the Year and All-Defensive First Team of the TPBL in 2025–26 season. On July 2, Gilbeck re-signed with the Formosa Dreamers of the Taiwan Professional Basketball League (TPBL).
