= Micheal Eric =

Nigerian basketball player (born 1988)

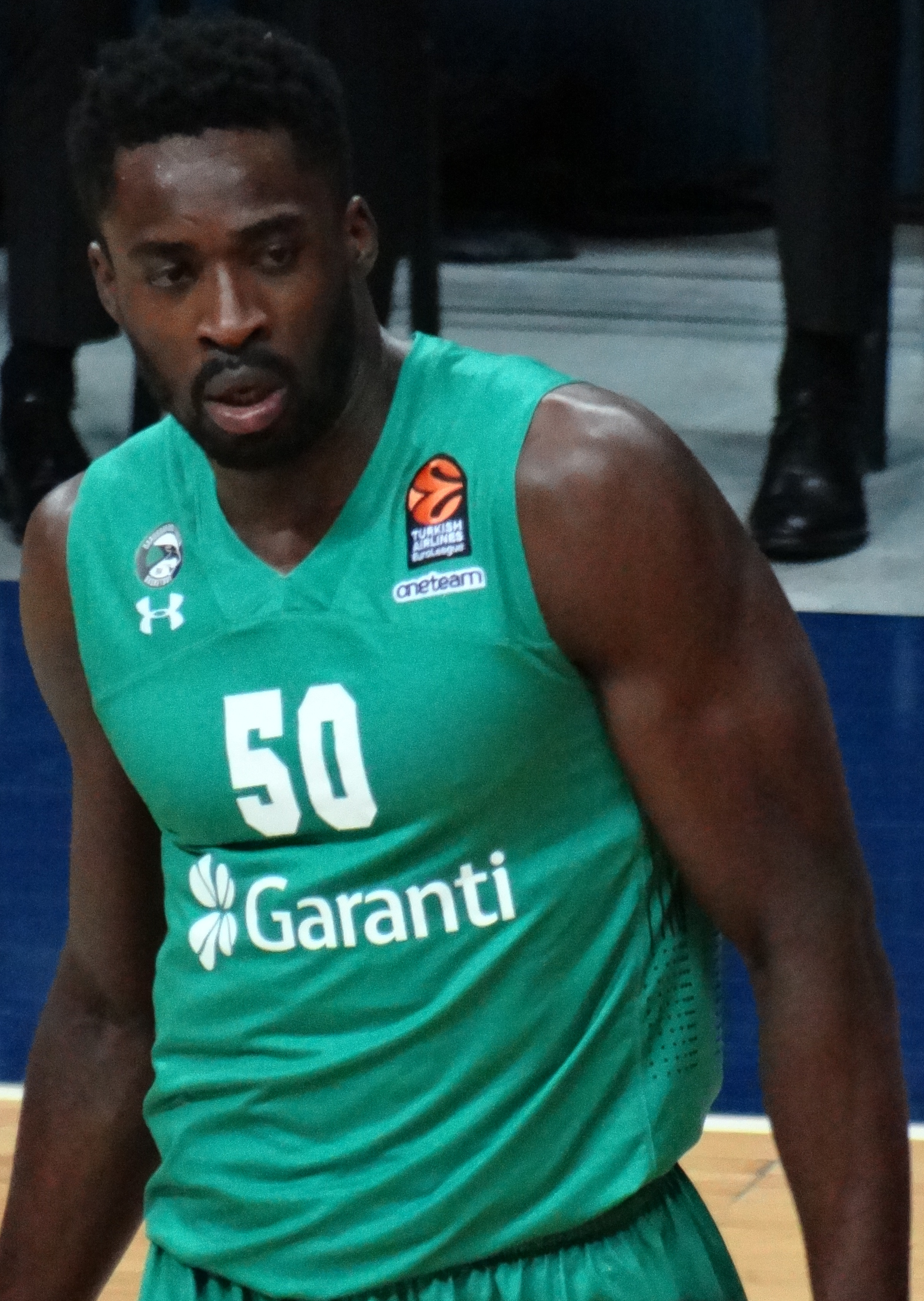
- Eric with Darüşşafaka in 2018

No. 50 – Abra Weavers
- Position: Center
- League: East Asia Super League

Personal information
- Born: June 24, 1988 (age 38) Lagos, Nigeria
- Listed height: 6 ft 11 in (2.11 m)
- Listed weight: 264 lb (120 kg)

Career information
- High school: Caesar Rodney (Camden, Delaware); Church Farm School (Exton, Pennsylvania)
- College: Temple (2008–2012)
- NBA draft: 2012: undrafted
- Playing career: 2012–present

Career history
- 2012–2013: Canton Charge
- 2013–2014: Texas Legends
- 2014: Panelefsiniakos
- 2014–2015: Enel Brindisi
- 2015–2016: Texas Legends
- 2016: AEK Athens
- 2016–2017: Bilbao Basket
- 2017–2019: Darüşşafaka
- 2019–2020: Baskonia
- 2020–2021: Türk Telekom
- 2021: CSKA Moscow
- 2021–2022: Unicaja Málaga
- 2023: Türk Telekom
- 2023–2024: Suwon KT Sonicboom
- 2024: Halcones Rojos Veracruz
- 2024: Al Ahli Tripoli
- 2024–2025: Taipei Taishin Mars
- 2025–2026: Changwon LG Sakers
- 2026–Present: Abra Weavers

Career highlights
- VTB League champion (2021); Liga Endesa champion (2020); EuroCup champion (2018); NBA D-League All-Defensive Team (2016); NBA D-League All-Star (2016); NBA D-League All-Rookie Second Team (2013)
- Stats at Basketball Reference

Micheal Oluwaseun Eric (born June 24, 1988) is a Nigerian professional basketball player for the Abra Weavers of the East Asia Super League (EASL). He played college basketball for Temple.

== Early life ==
Born and raised in Lagos, Nigeria, Eric did not play basketball as a youth as his dad was a soccer coach and he liked to focus on his education. Despite basketball being a popular sport in Nigeria, he dismissed the sport until he grew five inches in a span of two years. He traveled to Delaware in 2004 to visit his brother, Stephen, who wouldn't let him return to Nigeria. Stephen knew with his younger brother's height – he was 6-foot-8 at the time – he could make a future for himself in basketball. Newly arrived in the United States, Eric enrolled at Caesar Rodney High School in Camden, Delaware where he spent his sophomore year before transferring to Church Farm School in Exton, Pennsylvania for his junior year.

=== High school career ===
Eric played two seasons at Church Farm as he earned first-team all-league and all-area as a junior and senior. As a junior in 2005–06, he averaged 16 points, 15 rebounds and eight blocks per game.

In November 2006, Eric signed a National Letter of Intent to play college basketball for Temple University.

As a senior in 2006–07, Eric averaged 19 points, 14 rebounds and four blocks per game while leading Church Farm to the KASC regular season championship.

== College career ==
To Eric's disappointment, he was ruled ineligible to compete in 2007–08 due to NCAA initial eligibility guidelines, forcing him to redshirt the season. He went on to join the Temple Owls in 2008–09 where he averaged 2.7 points and 2.1 rebounds in 27 games.

As a sophomore in 2009–10, Eric played in 31 games, starting 29, as he finished fifth on the team in scoring with 5.9 points per game. In addition, his 20 blocks and .516 field goal percentage ranked second on the team. He also averaged 7.0 rebounds and 3.0 assists in just 15.7 minutes per game.

As a junior in 2010–11, Eric was named the team co-captain. He started the first 24 games of season before fracturing his right patella in practice which sidelined him for remainder of season. he averaged 7.1 points and 1.6 blocks, as well as ranking second on team with 5.9 rebounds per game and third with .490 field goal percentage.

As a senior in 2011–12, Eric again missed significant time with another right patella fracture, sitting out all of December and most of January with the injury. He played in 19 games, starting 15 times, as he was first on the team in rebounding (8.8 rpg) and fifth on the team in scoring (9.0 ppg). He tied his career-high with 19 points and a game-high 15 rebounds against UMass on February 29, 2012.

== Professional career ==
After going undrafted in the 2012 NBA draft, Eric joined the Cleveland Cavaliers for the 2012 NBA Summer League. On August 10, 2012, he signed with the Cavaliers but was later waived on October 27, 2012. In November 2012, he was acquired by the Canton Charge of the NBA Development League as an affiliate player.

In July 2013, Eric joined the Philadelphia 76ers for the Orlando Summer League and the Golden State Warriors for the Las Vegas Summer League. On November 1, 2013, he was reacquired by the Canton Charge. Three days later, he was traded to the Texas Legends. On January 15, 2014, he was waived by the Legends due to a season-ending injury.

On September 27, 2014, Eric signed with the Milwaukee Bucks. However, he was later waived by the Bucks on October 27, 2014. On December 4, 2014, he signed with Panelefsiniakos of the Greek Basket League and made his debut for the team on December 13. However, the next day, he signed with Enel Brindisi of Italy for the rest of the 2014–15 season, replacing Cedric Simmons in the line-up after the forward suffered a season-ending knee injury.

In July 2015, Eric joined the Milwaukee Bucks for the 2015 NBA Summer League. On October 31, Eric returned to the Texas Legends. He was waived by the Legends on November 11, and reacquired on November 20. On January 29, 2016, he was named in the West All-Star team for the 2016 NBA D-League All-Star Game. At the season's end, he earned NBA D-League All-Defensive Team honors. On April 5, 2016, Eric signed with AEK Athens of Greece for the rest of the 2015–16 Greek Basket League season.

In July 2016, Eric joined the Washington Wizards for the 2016 NBA Summer League. On August 7, 2016, he signed with Bilbao Basket of Spain for the 2016–17 season.

On July 18, 2017, Eric signed with the Turkish club Darüşşafaka for the 2017–18 season.

On July 9, 2019, Eric signed a two-year deal with Spanish club Kirolbet Baskonia. He averaged 7 points and 3.6 rebounds per game. That season, Eric won the Liga Endesa with Saski Baskonia. On July 7, 2020, Eric parted ways with the team. He signed with Türk Telekom of the Turkish Super League on July 15.

On February 10, 2021, Eric signed with CSKA Moscow of the VTB United League and the EuroLeague for the rest of the 2020–21 season.He reached Final Four and won the VTB League. On June 16, 2021, Eric officially parted ways with the Russian club.

On August 9, 2021, he has signed with Unicaja Málaga of the Spanish Liga ACB. Eric suffered a season-ending ruptured ACL injury on January 26, 2022.

On January 13, 2023, Eric returned to Türk Telekom. He reached Eurocup Finals against Gran Canaria. On June 21, 2023, he mutually parted ways with the Turkish club once again.

On July 28, 2023, Eric has agreed to play in South Korea for Suwon KT Sonicboom of Korean Basketball League.

In October 2024, Eric joined Al Ahli Tripoli of Libya. On November 8, Eric signed with the Taipei Taishin Mars of the Taiwan Professional Basketball League (TPBL).

On June 27, 2025, Eric signed with the Changwon LG Sakers of the Korean Basketball League (KBL).

== Career statistics ==
Legend
GP	Games played	GS	Games started	MPG	Minutes per game
FG%	Field-goal percentage	3P%	3-point field-goal percentage	FT%	Free-throw percentage
RPG	Rebounds per game	APG	Assists per game	SPG	Steals per game
BPG	Blocks per game	PPG	Points per game	PIR	Performance index rating
**Bold**	Career high

=== EuroLeague ===
*	Led the league

Year	Team	GP	GS	MPG	FG%	3P%	FT%	RPG	APG	SPG	BPG	PPG	PIR
2018–19	Darüşşafaka	**29**	20	**20.3**	.540	—	.656	**5.0**	**.9**	.3	**.9**	**11.1**	**10.4**
2019–20	Baskonia	28*	**22**	15.0	.552	—	.457	2.7	.3	**.8**	.6	5.7	4.4
2020–21	CSKA Moscow	14	9	12.4	**.667**	—	**.700**	3.3	.2	.6	.5	5.4	6.4
Career		71	51	16.6	.631	—	.599	3.8	.5	.5	.7	7.8	7.3
