= 2024 PLG finals =

2024 P. League+ finals
| Team | Coach | Wins |
|---|---|---|
| Taoyuan Pauian Pilots | Iurgi Caminos | 1 |
| New Taipei Kings | Ryan Marchand | 4 |
- Dates: June 9–20
- MVP: Lee Kai-Yan

The 2024 PLG finals is the championship series of the P. League+'s (PLG) 2023–24 season and conclusion of the season's playoffs. The series is scheduled to start on June 9 and end on June 24.

== Background ==
=== Road to the finals ===
| Team | GP | W | L | PCT |
|---|---|---|---|---|
| z – Taoyuan Pauian Pilots | 40 | 26 | 14 | .650 |
| x – Formosa Dreamers | 40 | 24 | 16 | .600 |
| x – New Taipei Kings | 40 | 22 | 18 | .550 |
| x – Hsinchu Toplus Lioneers | 40 | 21 | 19 | .525 |
| Taipei Fubon Braves | 40 | 18 | 22 | .450 |
| Kaohsiung 17LIVE Steelers | 40 | 9 | 31 | .225 |

Notes

- z – Clinched home court advantage for the entire playoffs
- x – Clinched playoff spot

Playoff results
| Taoyuan Pauian Pilots | | New Taipei Kings |
|---|---|---|
| Defeated the 4th-seeded Hsinchu Toplus Lioneers, 4–2 | Playoffs | Defeated the 2nd-seeded Formosa Dreamers, 4–2 |

=== Regular season series ===
The regular season series is tied 4–4.

November 19, 2023

Boxscore

Taoyuan Pauian Pilots 113, New Taipei Kings 123

Xinzhuang Gymnasium, New Taipei City

November 25, 2023

Boxscore

Taoyuan Pauian Pilots 92, New Taipei Kings 98

Xinzhuang Gymnasium, New Taipei City

December 9, 2023

Boxscore

New Taipei Kings 107, Taoyuan Pauian Pilots 86

Taoyuan Arena, Taoyuan City

December 17, 2023

Boxscore

New Taipei Kings 90, Taoyuan Pauian Pilots 100

Taoyuan Arena, Taoyuan City

February 18, 2024

Boxscore

Taoyuan Pauian Pilots 112, New Taipei Kings 97

Xinzhuang Gymnasium, New Taipei City

March 2, 2024

Boxscore

New Taipei Kings 87, Taoyuan Pauian Pilots 94

Taoyuan Arena, Taoyuan City

April 28, 2024

Boxscore

Taoyuan Pauian Pilots 76, New Taipei Kings 94

Xinzhuang Gymnasium, New Taipei City

May 15, 2024

Boxscore

New Taipei Kings 90, Taoyuan Pauian Pilots 92

Taoyuan Arena, Taoyuan City

== Series summary ==
| Game | Date | Away team | Result | Home team |
|---|---|---|---|---|
| Game 1 | Sunday, June 9 | New Taipei Kings | 89–82 (1–0) | Taoyuan Pauian Pilots |
| Game 2 | Wednesday, June 12 | New Taipei Kings | 70–90 (1–1) | Taoyuan Pauian Pilots |
| Game 3 | Saturday, June 15 | Taoyuan Pauian Pilots | 82–83 (1–2) | New Taipei Kings |
| Game 4 | Monday, June 17 | Taoyuan Pauian Pilots | 82–90 (1–3) | New Taipei Kings |
| Game 5 | Thursday, June 20 | New Taipei Kings | 103–97 (OT) (4–1) | Taoyuan Pauian Pilots |

== Game summaries ==
=== Game 1 ===
June 9
5:00pm

Boxscore

New Taipei Kings 89, Taoyuan Pauian Pilots 82
Scoring by quarter: 31–17, 23–24, 30–25, 5–16
| Pts: Lee Kai-Yan 18; Rebs: Wendell Lewis 11; Asts: Jeremy Lin 5 | Pts: Alec Brown 17; Rebs: Brown, Washburn 9 each Asts: Pai Yao-Cheng 7 |
Kings leads series, 1–0

Taoyuan Arena, Taoyuan City
Attendance: 6,470
Referees: Chang Lu-Yueh, Chen Chao-Hung, Yu Hao-Ping

=== Game 2 ===
June 12
7:00pm

Boxscore

New Taipei Kings 70, Taoyuan Pauian Pilots 90
Scoring by quarter: 16–14, 7–27, 25–27, 22–22
| Pts: Jeremy Lin 20; Rebs: Daye, Manigault 8 each Asts: Jeremy Lin 6 | Pts: Lu Chun-Hsiang 18; Rebs: Alec Brown 15; Asts: Chou Yi-Hsiang 4 |
Series tied, 1–1

Taoyuan Arena, Taoyuan City
Attendance: 6,470
Referees: Lai Jian-Zhong, Yeh Chun-Hung, Yang Shih-Hsien

=== Game 3 ===
June 15
5:00pm

Boxscore

Taoyuan Pauian Pilots 82, New Taipei Kings 83
Scoring by quarter: 23–21, 24–23, 26–19, 9–20
| Pts: Alec Brown 22; Rebs: Jason Washburn 14; Asts: Chou Yi-Hsiang 5 | Pts: Je. Lin, Jo. Lin 15 each Rebs: Kenny Manigault 12; Asts: Jeremy Lin 4 |
King leads series, 2–1

Xinzhuang Gymnasium, New Taipei City
Attendance: 6,540
Referees: Pang Yun-Han, Mei Ming-Sheng, Wang Li-Chang

=== Game 4 ===
June 17
7:00pm

Boxscore

Taoyuan Pauian Pilots 82, New Taipei Kings 90
Scoring by quarter: 29–29, 19–20, 13–24, 21–17
| Pts: Jason Washburn 19; Rebs: Brown, Meeks, Washburn 7 each Asts: Meeks, Pai 3 each | Pts: Austin Daye 28; Rebs: Wendell Lewis 11; Asts: Joseph Lin 11 |
Kings leads series, 3–1

Xinzhuang Gymnasium, New Taipei City
Attendance: 6,540
Referees: Chen Hung-Ming, Hung Yung-Yu, Huang Chen-Feng

=== Game 5 ===
June 20
7:00pm

Boxscore

New Taipei Kings 103, Taoyuan Pauian Pilots 97 (OT)
Scoring by quarter: 22–22, 30–19, 28–26, 5–18, Overtime: 18–12
| Pts: Lee, Jo. Lin 17 each Rebs: Austin Daye 16; Asts: Joseph Lin 7 | Pts: Lu Chun-Hsiang 23; Rebs: Treveon Graham 13; Asts: Pai Yao-Cheng 6 |
Kings wins series, 4–1

Taoyuan Arena, Taoyuan City
Attendance: 6,470
Referees: Chang Lu-Yueh, Chen Chao-Hung, Yeh Chun-Hung

== Rosters ==
=== Taoyuan Pauian Pilots ===
2023–24 Taoyuan Pauian Pilots roster
Players
Coaches

| Pos. | No. | Nat. | Name | Ht. | Wt. | DOB (YYYY-MM-DD) | From |
|---|---|---|---|---|---|---|---|
| G | 0 | (Taiwan) | Chou Yi-Hsiang | 1.91 m (6 ft 3 in) | 99 kg (218 lb) | 34 – 4 February 1991 | SLCC |
| C | 1 | (Senegal) | Amdy Dieng (FS) | 2.07 m (6 ft 9 in) | 105 kg (231 lb) | 26 – 1 August 1998 | NCCU |
| G | 2 | (Taiwan) | Chen Yu-Jui | 1.85 m (6 ft 1 in) | 75 kg (165 lb) | 29 – 22 December 1995 | NTSU |
| C | 5 | (United States) | Kennedy Meeks (I) | 2.08 m (6 ft 10 in) | 113 kg (249 lb) | 30 – 5 February 1995 | North Carolina |
| G | 6 | (Taiwan) | Kuan Ta-You | 1.81 m (5 ft 11 in) | 89 kg (196 lb) | 27 – 15 September 1997 | NTSU |
| F | 7 | (Taiwan) | Chiao Chu-Yu | 2.00 m (6 ft 7 in) | 98 kg (216 lb) | 24 – 28 September 2000 | Fu Jen |
| G | 8 | (Taiwan) | Chen Yu-Han | 1.88 m (6 ft 2 in) | 80 kg (176 lb) | 31 – 14 December 1993 | I-Shou |
| G | 9 | (Taiwan) | Lee Hsueh-Lin | 1.76 m (5 ft 9 in) | 75 kg (165 lb) | 41 – 31 January 1984 | TPEC |
| G | 10 | (Taiwan) | Lin Tzu-Wei | 1.88 m (6 ft 2 in) | 82 kg (181 lb) | 24 – 12 May 2000 | NKNU |
| G | 12 | (Taiwan) | Li Chia-Kang | 1.85 m (6 ft 1 in) | 85 kg (187 lb) | 26 – 16 October 1998 | NTSU |
| C | 21 | (United States) | Alec Brown (I) | 2.16 m (7 ft 1 in) | 107 kg (236 lb) | 32 – 23 July 1992 | Green Bay |
| F | 24 | (United States) | Treveon Graham (I) | 1.98 m (6 ft 6 in) | 100 kg (220 lb) | 31 – 28 October 1993 | VCU |
| C | 25 | (Taiwan) | Lin Cheng | 2.02 m (6 ft 8 in) | 102 kg (225 lb) | 24 – 25 July 2000 | NTSU |
| F | 27 | (Taiwan) | Chang Chen-Ya | 1.96 m (6 ft 5 in) | 86 kg (190 lb) | 25 – 13 October 1999 | NCCU |
| G | 30 | (Taiwan) | Pai Yao-Cheng | 1.84 m (6 ft 0 in) | 72 kg (159 lb) | 26 – 2 February 1999 | I-Shou |
| C | 42 | (United States) (Bulgaria) | Jason Washburn (I) | 2.13 m (7 ft 0 in) | 111 kg (245 lb) | 34 – 5 June 1990 | Utah |
| G | 69 | (Taiwan) | Lu Chun-Hsiang | 1.90 m (6 ft 3 in) | 82 kg (181 lb) | 27 – 15 July 1997 | Fu Jen |

Head coach

- (Spain) Iurgi Caminos

Assistant coach(es)

- (Taiwan) Huang Chi-Feng
- (Taiwan) Ma Yi-Hung
- (Taiwan) Tang Wei-Jie
- (Taiwan) Yang I-Feng

Strength & conditioning coach(es)

- (Taiwan) Liu Hou-Shao
- (Taiwan) Liu Nien-Chieh

Athletic trainer(s)

- (Taiwan) Peng Li-Chen
- (Taiwan) Wu Yun-Kai

Legend

- (C) Team captain
- (I) Import player
- (FS) Foreign student player
- (HP) Heritage player
- (FA) Free agent
- (DP) Unsigned draft pick
- (AI) EASL Asian import
- (S) Suspended
- Injured

=== New Taipei Kings ===
2023–24 New Taipei Kings roster
Players
Coaches

| Pos. | No. | Nat. | Name | Ht. | Wt. | DOB (YYYY-MM-DD) | From |
|---|---|---|---|---|---|---|---|
| G | 1 | (United States) (Taiwan) | Joseph Lin (HP) | 1.82 m (6 ft 0 in) | 69 kg (152 lb) | 32 – 21 June 1992 | Hamilton |
| G | 2 | (Taiwan) | Su Pei-Kai | 1.83 m (6 ft 0 in) | 84 kg (185 lb) | 25 – 2 November 1999 | NTUA |
| F | 3 | (Taiwan) | Chen Chun-Nan | 1.90 m (6 ft 3 in) | 90 kg (198 lb) | 24 – 20 April 2000 | NTSU |
| G | 4 | (Taiwan) | Li Wei-Ting | 1.81 m (5 ft 11 in) | 84.3 kg (186 lb) | 25 – 3 October 1999 | SHU |
| F | 6 | (Taiwan) | Yang Chin-Min | 1.90 m (6 ft 3 in) | 92 kg (203 lb) | 41 – 22 January 1984 | Fu Jen |
| G | 7 | (United States) (Taiwan) | Jeremy Lin (HP) | 1.91 m (6 ft 3 in) | 91 kg (201 lb) | 36 – 23 August 1988 | Harvard |
| G | 9 | (Taiwan) | Lee Kai-Yan | 1.82 m (6 ft 0 in) | 80 kg (176 lb) | 31 – 6 May 1993 | HWU |
| G | 10 | (Taiwan) | Chien You-Che | 1.80 m (5 ft 11 in) | 80 kg (176 lb) | 29 – 10 September 1995 | Chien Hsin Tech |
| C | 11 | (Taiwan) | Wang Po-Chih | 1.95 m (6 ft 5 in) | 130 kg (287 lb) | 28 – 29 October 1996 | NTSU |
| F | 14 | (United States) | Tony Mitchell (I) | 2.01 m (6 ft 7 in) | 107 kg (236 lb) | 32 – 7 April 1992 | North Texas |
| F | 17 | (Taiwan) | Su Shih-Hsuan | 1.97 m (6 ft 6 in) | 95 kg (209 lb) | 28 – 9 April 1996 | NTNU |
| F | 19 | (Taiwan) | Lin Chin-Pang (C) | 1.90 m (6 ft 3 in) | 90 kg (198 lb) | 39 – 15 June 1985 | NTCPE |
| G | 24 | (Taiwan) | Hung Chih-Shan | 1.76 m (5 ft 9 in) | 80 kg (176 lb) | 39 – 5 July 1985 | NTUT |
| F | 25 | (United States) | Austin Daye (I) | 2.07 m (6 ft 9 in) | 91 kg (201 lb) | 36 – 5 June 1988 | Gonzaga |
| F | 35 | (United States) | Wendell Lewis (I) | 2.08 m (6 ft 10 in) | 118 kg (260 lb) | 35 – 21 September 1989 | Alabama State |
| F | 49 | (Taiwan) | Chai Chen-Hao | 1.94 m (6 ft 4 in) | 95 kg (209 lb) | 31 – 25 July 1993 | UKN |
| F | 55 | (United States) | Kenny Manigault (I) | 1.96 m (6 ft 5 in) | 93 kg (205 lb) | 33 – 22 May 1991 | Pikeville |
| G | 72 | (Taiwan) | Lin Li-Jen | 1.83 m (6 ft 0 in) | 85 kg (187 lb) | 34 – 16 June 1990 | MingDao |

Head coach

- (United States) Ryan Marchand

Assistant coach(es)

- (United States) Mark Coppola
- (Taiwan) Lin Cheng-Yu

Strength & conditioning coach(es)

- (Taiwan) Chang Chung-Hsi
- (Taiwan) Liu Cheng-Yu

Athletic trainer(s)

- (Taiwan) Chiu Po-Kai
- (Taiwan) Wu Chung-Hao

Legend

- (C) Team captain
- (I) Import player
- (FS) Foreign student player
- (HP) Heritage player
- (FA) Free agent
- (DP) Unsigned draft pick
- (AI) EASL Asian import
- (S) Suspended
- Injured

== Player statistics ==
Legend
| GP | Games played | MPG | Minutes per game | 2P% | 2-point field goal percentage |
| 3P% | 3-point field goal percentage | FT% | Free throw percentage | RPG | Rebounds per game |
| APG | Assists per game | SPG | Steals per game | BPG | Blocks per game |
| PPG | Points per game |

Taoyuan Pauian Pilots

| Player | GP | MPG | PPG | 2P% | 3P% | FT% | RPG | APG | SPG | BPG |
|---|---|---|---|---|---|---|---|---|---|---|
| Alec Brown | 5 | 30:47 | 14.20 | 64.29% | 53.85% | 66.67% | 10.20 | 1.40 | 0.60 | 1.00 |
| Chang Chen-Ya | 5 | 12:47 | 1.00 | 50.00% | 0.00% | 75.00% | 0.40 | 0.40 | 0.40 | 0.00 |
| Chen Yu-Jui | 4 | 03:30 | 0.25 | 0.00% | 0.00% | 50.00% | 0.50 | 1.00 | 0.25 | 0.00 |
| Chou Yi-Hsiang | 5 | 28:50 | 7.20 | 19.05% | 26.09% | 100.00% | 3.40 | 3.00 | 0.40 | 0.20 |
| Treveon Graham | 1 | 39:53 | 17.00 | 57.14% | 28.57% | 50.00% | 13.00 | 3.00 | 2.00 | 0.00 |
| Kuan Ta-You | 4 | 05:29 | 1.00 | 40.00% | 0.00% | 0.00% | 0.00 | 0.75 | 0.25 | 0.00 |
| Lee Hsueh-Lin | 3 | 07:02 | 0.67 | 33.33% | 0.00% | 0.00% | 1.00 | 1.33 | 0.00 | 0.00 |
| Li Chia-Kang | 5 | 26:27 | 10.40 | 37.93% | 30.43% | 69.23% | 4.60 | 2.00 | 1.40 | 0.00 |
| Lin Cheng | 2 | 10:06 | 1.50 | 0.00% | 100.00% | 0.00% | 2.00 | 0.50 | 0.00 | 0.00 |
| Lin Tzu-Wei | 1 | 02:19 | 2.00 | 100.00% | 0.00% | 0.00% | 0.00 | 0.00 | 0.00 | 0.00 |
| Lu Chun-Hsiang | 5 | 35:39 | 13.60 | 38.30% | 31.82% | 73.33% | 3.00 | 2.40 | 0.80 | 0.00 |
| Kennedy Meeks | 4 | 28:56 | 9.75 | 40.63% | 20.00% | 76.92% | 8.75 | 1.50 | 0.50 | 0.75 |
| Pai Yao-Cheng | 5 | 27:56 | 11.00 | 34.09% | 38.46% | 66.67% | 4.60 | 4.40 | 0.80 | 0.20 |
| Jason Washburn | 5 | 35:28 | 15.60 | 53.19% | 0.00% | 80.00% | 10.00 | 0.80 | 1.00 | 0.40 |

New Taipei Kings

| Player | GP | MPG | PPG | 2P% | 3P% | FT% | RPG | APG | SPG | BPG |
|---|---|---|---|---|---|---|---|---|---|---|
| Chen Chun-Nan | 1 | 02:19 | 0.00 | 0.00% | 0.00% | 0.00% | 0.00 | 0.00 | 0.00 | 0.00 |
| Chien You-Che | 4 | 07:08 | 2.25 | 0.00% | 60.00% | 0.00% | 0.75 | 0.25 | 0.25 | 0.00 |
| Austin Daye | 5 | 34:09 | 13.20 | 43.33% | 31.25% | 90.91% | 9.80 | 3.40 | 0.80 | 1.40 |
| Hung Chih-Shan | 4 | 09:24 | 3.00 | 0.00% | 57.14% | 0.00% | 0.00 | 1.00 | 0.00 | 0.00 |
| Lee Kai-Yan | 5 | 37:30 | 14.20 | 45.71% | 44.44% | 60.00% | 4.40 | 1.40 | 1.20 | 0.20 |
| Wendell Lewis | 5 | 31:44 | 11.40 | 68.42% | 0.00% | 33.33% | 8.40 | 0.40 | 1.00 | 0.80 |
| Li Wei-Ting | 1 | 02:19 | 3.00 | 0.00% | 100.00% | 0.00% | 0.00 | 0.00 | 0.00 | 0.00 |
| Lin Chin-Pang | 3 | 09:21 | 0.67 | 33.33% | 0.00% | 0.00% | 1.00 | 0.67 | 0.00 | 0.00 |
| Jeremy Lin | 4 | 35:23 | 17.00 | 46.15% | 14.81% | 95.24% | 6.25 | 4.25 | 2.25 | 1.50 |
| Joseph Lin | 5 | 30:09 | 9.20 | 31.58% | 34.48% | 80.00% | 1.20 | 5.00 | 1.60 | 0.60 |
| Kenny Manigault | 3 | 26:07 | 12.00 | 34.78% | 45.45% | 83.33% | 8.33 | 2.00 | 2.00 | 0.00 |
| Tony Mitchell | 2 | 13:09 | 2.50 | 25.00% | 0.00% | 100.00% | 5.50 | 1.50 | 0.00 | 1.50 |
| Su Shih-Hsuan | 5 | 12:40 | 3.20 | 40.00% | 37.50% | 100.00% | 4.80 | 0.20 | 0.60 | 0.40 |
| Wang Po-Chih | 1 | 02:19 | 0.00 | 0.00% | 0.00% | 0.00% | 1.00 | 0.00 | 0.00 | 0.00 |
| Yang Chin-Min | 5 | 29:16 | 8.80 | 30.77% | 33.33% | 58.33% | 4.00 | 1.20 | 0.60 | 0.20 |
