= List of Hsinchu Toplus Lioneers head coaches =

The Hsinchu Toplus Lioneers are a Taiwanese professional basketball team based in Hsinchu County, Taiwan. The team was formerly known as the Hsinchu JKO Lioneers from 2020 to 2023. The team is owned by Bros Sports Marketing and coached by Wesam Al-Sous, with Chang Shu-Jen as the general manager. The Lioneers won 0 P. League+ championship and 0 Taiwan Professional Basketball League championship since the team was founded in 2020.

There have been 4 head coaches for the Hsinchu Toplus Lioneers franchise and haven't won any P. League+ and Taiwan Professional Basketball League championship.

== Coaches ==
=== Key ===
GC	Games coached
W	Wins
L	Losses
Win%	Winning percentage
#	Number of coaches

Note: Statistics are correct through the end of the 2025–26 TPBL season.

#	Name	Term	GC	W	L	Win%	GC	W	L	Win%	Achievements
#	Name	Term	Regular season				Playoffs				Achievements
Hsinchu JKO Lioneers
1	Lin Kuan-Lun	2020–2023	94	42	52	.447	10	4	6	.400	2021–22 PLG Coach of the Year
Hsinchu Toplus Lioneers
—	Lin Kuan-Lun	2023–2024	16	7	9	.438	–	–	–	–	
2	Milan Mitrovic	2024 (PLG, TPBL)	31	16	15	.516	6	2	4	.333	
3	Seng Hsin-Han	2024	2	0	2	.000	–	–	–	–	
4	Wesam Al-Sous	2024–present	63	32	31	.508	4	1	3	.250	
