= 2024 PLG playoffs =

Professional basketball tournament to determine the 2024 champion of the PLG

Tournament details
- Dates: May 23–June 20, 2024
- Season: 2023–24
- Teams: 4

Final positions
- Champions: New Taipei Kings (1st title)
- Runner-up: Taoyuan Pauian Pilots

The 2024 PLG playoffs is the postseason tournament of the 2023–24 PLG season. The playoffs began on May 23 and ended on June 24.

== Format ==
The top four seed qualify the playoffs. All seeds will play the playoffs series. The winners advance and play in the finals series. The seeding is based on each team's regular season record. Home court advantage goes to the higher seed for both series. All series are best-of-seven, which is in a 2-2-1-1-1 format.

== Playoff qualifying ==
On April 28, 2024, the Formosa Dreamers became the first team to clinch a playoff spot. On May 18, the Taoyuan Pauian Pilots clinched the regular season title.

Seed	Team	Record	Clinched	
Seed	Team	Record	Playoff berth	Best record in PLG
1	Taoyuan Pauian Pilots	26–14	April 30	May 18
2	Formosa Dreamers	24–16	April 28	—
3	New Taipei Kings	22–18	May 11	—
4	Hsinchu Toplus Lioneers	21–19	May 18	—

== Bracket ==
Playoffs
1	Pilots	4
4	Lioneers	2
2	Dreamers	2
3	Kings	4

Finals
1	Pilots	1
3	Kings	4

Bold Series winner
Italic Team with home-court advantage

== Playoffs: (1) Taoyuan Pauian Pilots vs. (4) Hsinchu Toplus Lioneers ==
23 May 2024 Game 1	Hsinchu Toplus Lioneers	82– 95 (Series: Pilots leads series, 1–0)	Taoyuan Pauian Pilots	Taoyuan Arena, Taoyuan City
19:00 (UTC+8)	Scoring by quarter: 22–25, 14–28, 23–20, 23–22
	Pts: Michael Holyfield 22; Rebs: Michael Holyfield 19; Asts: Michael Efevberha 5	boxscore	Pts: Lu Chun-Hsiang 24; Rebs: Treveon Graham 12; Asts: Lu Chun-Hsiang 7	Attendance: 3,255; Referees: Pang Yun-Han, Yeh Chun-Hung, Yang Shih-Hsian

25 May 2024 Game 2	Hsinchu Toplus Lioneers	118–102 (Series: Series tied, 1–1)	Taoyuan Pauian Pilots	Taoyuan Arena, Taoyuan City
17:00 (UTC+8)	Scoring by quarter: 37–22, 26–27, 29–29, 26–24
	Pts: Michael Efevberha 38; Rebs: Michael Holyfield 14; Asts: Tien Hao 7	boxscore	Pts: Jason Washburn 25; Rebs: Kennedy Meeks 11; Asts: Lu Chun-Hsiang 12	Attendance: 6,088; Referees: Lai Jian-Zhong, Mei Ming-Sheng, Chen Chao-Hung

27 May 2024 Game 3	Taoyuan Pauian Pilots	95–99 (Series: Lioneers leads series, 2–1)	Hsinchu Toplus Lioneers	Hsinchu County Stadium, Hsinchu County
19:00 (UTC+8)	Scoring by quarter: 20–25, 28–24, 27–28, 20–22
	Pts: Lu Chun-Hsiang 23; Rebs: Jason Washburn 12; Asts: Chou, Lu, Pai 5 each	boxscore	Pts: Michael Efevberha 29; Rebs: Michael Holyfield 17; Asts: Michael Efevberha 5	Attendance: 5,121; Referees: Hung Yung-Yu, Peng Shih-Hsuan, Huang Hsiao-Han

29 May 2024 Game 4	Taoyuan Pauian Pilots	101–88 (Series: Series tied, 2–2)	Hsinchu Toplus Lioneers	Hsinchu County Stadium, Hsinchu County
19:00 (UTC+8)	Scoring by quarter: 20–23, 27–23, 28–20, 26–22
	Pts: Treveon Graham 26; Rebs: Lin C., Washburn 7 each Asts: Lu, Pai 5 each	boxscore	Pts: Michael Efevberha 29; Rebs: Michael Holyfield 19; Asts: Tien Hao 3	Attendance: 5,831; Referees: Chen Hung-Ming, Huang Chen-Feng, Wang Li-Chang

31 May 2024 Game 5	Hsinchu Toplus Lioneers	79–97 (Series: Pilots leads series, 3–2)	Taoyuan Pauian Pilots	Taoyuan Arena, Taoyuan City
19:00 (UTC+8)	Scoring by quarter: 17–29, 22–31, 25–25, 15–12
	Pts: Kao Kuo-Hao 20; Rebs: Michael Holyfield 13; Asts: Tseng Po-Yu 4	boxscore	Pts: Lu Chun-Hsiang 27; Rebs: Jason Washburn 15; Asts: Kuan Ta-You 6	Attendance: 3,848; Referees: Chang Lu-Yueh, Chen Chao-Hung, Yu Hao-Ping

2 June 2024 Game 6	Taoyuan Pauian Pilots	98–94 (Series: Pilots wins series, 4–2)	Hsinchu Toplus Lioneers	Hsinchu County Stadium, Hsinchu County
17:00 (UTC+8)	Scoring by quarter: 26–21, 21–12, 24–34, 27–27
	Pts: Alec Brown 24; Rebs: Alec Brown 11; Asts: Jason Washburn 6	boxscore	Pts: Michael Holyfield 23; Rebs: Deyonta Davis 15; Asts: Tien Hao 7	Attendance: 6,733; Referees: Pang Yun-Han, Yeh Chun-Hung, Yang Shih-Hsian

Regular-season series
Pilots won 6–2 in the regular-season series

December 10, 2023

Boxscore

Hsinchu Lioneers	98–81	Taoyuan Pauian Pilots

Taoyuan Arena, Taoyuan City

December 23, 2023

Boxscore

Taoyuan Pauian Pilots	80–93	Hsinchu Toplus Lioneers

Hsinchu County Stadium, Hsinchu County

January 16, 2024

Boxscore

Hsinchu Toplus Lioneers	82–94	Taoyuan Pauian Pilots

Taoyuan Arena, Taoyuan City

January 21, 2024

Boxscore

Taoyuan Pauian Pilots	83–72	Hsinchu Toplus Lioneers

Hsinchu County Stadium, Hsinchu County

March 30, 2024

Boxscore

Hsinchu Toplus Lioneers	71–96	Taoyuan Pauian Pilots

Taoyuan Arena, Taoyuan City

April 20, 2024

Boxscore

Taoyuan Pauian Pilots	106–96	Hsinchu Toplus Lioneers

Hsinchu County Stadium, Hsinchu County

May 5, 2024

Boxscore

Taoyuan Pauian Pilots	100–80	Hsinchu Toplus Lioneers

Hsinchu County Stadium, Hsinchu County

May 10, 2024

Boxscore

Hsinchu Toplus Lioneers	81–98	Taoyuan Pauian Pilots

Taoyuan Arena, Taoyuan City

== Playoffs: (2) Formosa Dreamers vs. (3) New Taipei Kings ==
24 May 2024 Game 1	New Taipei Kings	88–89 (Series: Dreamers leads series, 1–0)	Formosa Dreamers	Intercontinental Basketball Stadium, Taichung City
19:00 (UTC+8)	Scoring by quarter: 22–25, 26–28, 23–23, 17–13
	Pts: Jeremy Lin 25; Rebs: Kenny Manigault 9 Asts: Yang Chin-Min 5	boxscore	Pts: Chris McCullough 24; Rebs: Chris McCullough 13; Asts: Lin Chun-Chi 6	Attendance: 3,000; Referees: Chen Hung-Ming, Sung Ming-Lu, Wang Li-Chang

26 May 2024 Game 2	New Taipei Kings	90–86 (Series: Series tied, 1–1)	Formosa Dreamers	Intercontinental Basketball Stadium, Taichung City
17:00 (UTC+8)	Scoring by quarter: 33–27, 17–28, 13–11, 27–20
	Pts: Kenny Manigault 17; Rebs: Wendell Lewis 11; Asts: Joseph Lin 6	boxscore	Pts: Chris McCullough 23; Rebs: Chris McCullough 16; Asts: Devyn Marble 9	Attendance: 3,000; Referees: Chen Chao-Hung, Yu Hao-Ping, Huang Chen-Feng

28 May 2024 Game 3	Formosa Dreamers	89– 96 (Series: Kings leads series, 2–1)	New Taipei Kings	Xinzhuang Gymnasium, New Taipei City
19:00 (UTC+8)	Scoring by quarter: 28–22, 18–20, 24–28, 19–26
	Pts: Austin Daye 22; Rebs: Kenny Manigault 12; Asts: Kenny Manigault 5	boxscore	Pts: Chris McCullough 27; Rebs: Chris McCullough 12; Asts: Lin Chun-Chi 7	Attendance: 6,073; Referees: Chang Lu-Yueh, Tsung Hsiu-Hui, Chang Wei-Chun

30 May 2024 Game 4	Formosa Dreamers	73–87 (Series: Kings leads series, 3–1)	New Taipei Kings	Xinzhuang Gymnasium, New Taipei City
19:00 (UTC+8)	Scoring by quarter: 16–18, 18–17, 17–28, 22–24
	Pts: Julian Boyd 25; Rebs: Brandon Gilbeck 15; Asts: Lin Chun-Chi 7	boxscore	Pts: Kenny Manigault 21; Rebs: Kenny Manigault 17; Asts: Joseph Lin 8	Attendance: 6,394; Referees: Pang Yun-Han, Yeh Chun-Hung, Yang Shih-Hsian

1 June 2024 Game 5	New Taipei Kings	76–96 (Series: Kings leads series, 3–2)	Formosa Dreamers	Intercontinental Basketball Stadium, Taichung City
17:00 (UTC+8)	Scoring by quarter: 18–29, 20–26, 28–21, 10–20
	Pts: Jeremy Lin 19; Rebs: Kenny Manigault 13; Asts: Joseph Lin 6	boxscore	Pts: Chris McCullough 19; Rebs: Boyd, McCullough 11 each Asts: Lin Chun-Chi 10	Attendance: 3,000; Referees: Lai Jian-Zhong, Mei Ming-Sheng, Chen Chao-Hung

3 June 2024 Game 6	Formosa Dreamers	88–97 (Series: Kings wins series, 4–2)	New Taipei Kings	Xinzhuang Gymnasium, New Taipei City
19:00 (UTC+8)	Scoring by quarter: 33–31, 23–25, 14–12, 18–27
	Pts: Chris McCullough 22; Rebs: Chris McCullough 9 Asts: Lin Chun-Chi 5	boxscore	Pts: Jeremy Lin 33; Rebs: Lewis, Manigault 12 each Asts: Jeremy Lin 6	Attendance: 5,260; Referees: Chen Hung-Ming, Hung Yung-Yu, Peng Shih-Hsuan

Regular-season series
Dreamers won 6–2 in the regular-season series

December 24, 2023

Boxscore

Formosa Dreamers	120–104	New Taipei Kings

Xinzhuang Gymnasium, New Taipei City

January 6, 2023

Boxscore

New Taipei Kings	76–93	Formosa Dreamers

Changhua County Stadium, Changhua County

January 20, 2024

Boxscore

Formosa Dreamers	82–114	New Taipei Kings

Xinzhuang Gymnasium, New Taipei City

February 3, 2024

Boxscore

New Taipei Kings	70–91	Formosa Dreamers

Changhua County Stadium, Changhua County

March 26, 2024

Boxscore

Formosa Dreamers	103–101	New Taipei Kings

Xinzhuang Gymnasium, New Taipei City

March 31, 2024

Boxscore

Formosa Dreamers	108–105	New Taipei Kings

Xinzhuang Gymnasium, New Taipei City

April 13, 2024

Boxscore

New Taipei Kings	116–94	Formosa Dreamers

Changhua County Stadium, Changhua County

April 19, 2024

Boxscore

New Taipei Kings	93–97	Formosa Dreamers

Intercontinental Basketball Stadium, Taichung City

== PLG finals: (1) Taoyuan Pauian Pilots vs. (3) New Taipei Kings ==
9 June 2024 Game 1	New Taipei Kings	89–82 (Series: Kings leads series, 1–0)	Taoyuan Pauian Pilots	Taoyuan Arena, Taoyuan City
17:00 (UTC+8)	Scoring by quarter: 31–17, 23–24, 30–25, 5–16
	Pts: Lee Kai-Yan 18; Rebs: Wendell Lewis 11; Asts: Jeremy Lin 5	boxscore	Pts: Alec Brown 17; Rebs: Brown, Washburn 9 Asts: Pai Yao-Cheng 7	Referees: Chang Lu-Yueh, Chen Chao-Hung, Yu Hao-Ping

12 June 2024 Game 2	New Taipei Kings	70–90 (Series: Series tied, 1–1)	Taoyuan Pauian Pilots	Taoyuan Arena, Taoyuan City
19:00 (UTC+8)	Scoring by quarter: 16–14, 7–27, 25–27, 22–22
	Pts: Jeremy Lin 20; Rebs: Austin Daye 8 Asts: Jeremy Lin 6	boxscore	Pts: Lu Chun-Hsiang 18; Rebs: Alec Brown 15; Asts: Chou Yi-Hsiang 4	Referees: Lai Jian-Zhong, Yeh Chun-Hung, Yang Shih-Hsian

15 June 2024 Game 3	Taoyuan Pauian Pilots	82–83 (Series: Kings leads series, 2–1)	New Taipei Kings	Xinzhuang Gymnasium, New Taipei City
17:00 (UTC+8)	Scoring by quarter: 23–21, 24–23, 26–19, 9–20
	Pts: Alec Brown 22; Rebs: Jason Washburn 14; Asts: Chou Yi-Hsiang 5	boxscore	Pts: Jeremy, Joseph 15; Rebs: Kenny Manigault 12; Asts: Jeremy Lin 4	Referees: Pang Yun-Han, Mei Ming-Sheng, Wang Li-Chang

17 June 2024 Game 4	Taoyuan Pauian Pilots	82–90 (Series: Kings leads series, 3–1)	New Taipei Kings	Xinzhuang Gymnasium, New Taipei City
19:00 (UTC+8)	Scoring by quarter: 29–29, 19–20, 13–24, 21–17
	Pts: Jason Washburn 14; Rebs: Washburn, Brown, Meeks 7 Asts: Pai, Meeks 3	boxscore	Pts: Austin Daye 28; Rebs: Wendell Lewis 11; Asts: Joseph Lin 11	Referees: Chen Hung-Ming, Hung Yung-Yu, Huang Chen-Feng

20 June 2024 Game 5	New Taipei Kings	103–97(OT) (Series: Kings wins series, 4–1)	Taoyuan Pauian Pilots	Taoyuan Arena, Taoyuan City
19:00 (UTC+8)	Scoring by quarter: 22–22, 30–19, 30–26, 5–18, Overtime: 18–12
	Pts: Joseph Lin 17; Rebs: Austin Daye 16; Asts: Joseph Lin 7	boxscore	Pts: Lu Chun-Hsiang 23; Rebs: Trevon Graham 12; Asts: Pai Yao-Cheng 6	Referees: Chang Lu-Yueh, Chen Chao-Hung, Yeh Chun-Hung

Regular-season series
Teams draw 4–4 in the regular-season series

November 19, 2023

Boxscore

Taoyuan Pauian Pilots	113–123	New Taipei Kings

Xinzhuang Gymnasium, New Taipei City

November 25, 2023

Boxscore

Taoyuan Pauian Pilots	92–98	New Taipei Kings

Xinzhuang Gymnasium, New Taipei City

December 9, 2023

Boxscore

New Taipei Kings	107–86	Taoyuan Pauian Pilots

Taoyuan Arena, Taoyuan

December 17, 2023

Boxscore

New Taipei Kings	90–100	Taoyuan Pauian Pilots

Taoyuan Arena, Taoyuan

February 18, 2024

Boxscore

Taoyuan Pauian Pilots	112–97	New Taipei Kings

Xinzhuang Gymnasium, New Taipei City

March 2, 2024

Boxscore

New Taipei Kings	87–94	Taoyuan Pauian Pilots

Taoyuan Arena, Taoyuan

April 28, 2024

Boxscore

Taoyuan Pauian Pilots	76–94	New Taipei Kings

Xinzhuang Gymnasium, New Taipei City

May 14, 2024

Boxscore

New Taipei Kings	90–92	Taoyuan Pauian Pilots

Taoyuan Arena, Taoyuan
