= 2023–24 Taoyuan Pauian Pilots season =

Taiwanese professional basketball season

Taoyuan Pauian Pilots
2023–24 season
- President: Li Chung-Shu
- General Manager: ~~Chen Hsin-An~~ (role adjustment); Li Chung-Shu
- Head Coach: Iurgi Caminos
- Arena: Taoyuan Arena
- P. League+: 26–14 (.650)
- Playoffs: PLG finals (lost to Kings 1–4)
- Scoring leader: Jason Washburn (21.86)
- Rebounding leader: Jason Washburn (13.16)
- Assists leader: Pai Yao-Cheng (4.87)
- Highest home attendance: 4,288 (December 9, 2023)
- Lowest home attendance: 1,279 (December 16, 2023)
- Average home attendance: 2,250
- Biggest win: Pilots 100–71 Braves (January 7, 2024)
- Biggest defeat: Pilots 83–106 Braves (January 28, 2024)
- All statistics correct as of May 20, 2024.

The 2023–24 Taoyuan Pauian Pilots season was the franchise's 4th season, its fourth season in the P. League+ (PLG), its 4th in Taoyuan City. The Pilots is coached by Iurgi Caminos in his second year as head coach.

== Draft ==
Round	Pick	Player	Position	Status	School/club team
1	2	Qiao Chu-Yu	F	Local	FJU

On October 21, 2021, the Pilots acquired 2023 first-round draft pick from Kaohsiung Steelers in exchange for Peng Chun-Yen. On June 19, 2023, the Pilots' 2023 first-round 4th draft pick, Chen Kuan-Chuan and Shih Chin-Yao was traded to Kaohsiung 17LIVE Steelers in exchange for Chou Yi-Hsiang.

== Standings ==
Pos	Team	W	L	PCT	GB	Qualification
1	Taoyuan Pauian Pilots	26	14	.650	—	Playoffs
2	Formosa Dreamers	24	16	.600	2	Playoffs
3	New Taipei Kings	22	18	.550	4	Playoffs
4	Hsinchu Toplus Lioneers	21	19	.525	5	Playoffs
5	Taipei Fubon Braves	18	22	.450	8	
6	Kaohsiung 17LIVE Steelers	9	31	.225	17	

Updated to match(es) played on 19 May 2024. Source: P.League+

== Roster ==
Note: Flags indicate national team eligibility at FIBA-sanctioned events. Players may hold other non-FIBA nationalities not displayed.

2023–24 Taoyuan Pauian Pilots roster
Players
Coaches

Pos.	No.	Nat.	Name	Ht.	Wt.	DOB (YYYY-MM-DD)	From
G	0	(Taiwan)	Chou Yi-Hsiang	1.91 m (6 ft 3 in)	99 kg (218 lb)	34 – 4 February 1991	SLCC
C	1	(Senegal)	Amdy Dieng (injured) (FS)	2.07 m (6 ft 9 in)	105 kg (231 lb)	27 – 1 August 1998	NCCU
G	2	(Taiwan)	Chen Yu-Jui	1.85 m (6 ft 1 in)	75 kg (165 lb)	29 – 22 December 1995	NTSU
C	5	(United States)	Kennedy Meeks (I)	2.08 m (6 ft 10 in)	113 kg (249 lb)	30 – 5 February 1995	North Carolina
G	6	(Taiwan)	Kuan Ta-You	1.81 m (5 ft 11 in)	89 kg (196 lb)	27 – 15 September 1997	NTSU
F	7	(Taiwan)	Chiao Chu-Yu	2.00 m (6 ft 7 in)	98 kg (216 lb)	24 – 28 September 2000	Fu Jen
G	8	(Taiwan)	Chen Yu-Han	1.88 m (6 ft 2 in)	80 kg (176 lb)	31 – 14 December 1993	I-Shou
G	9	(Taiwan)	Lee Hsueh-Lin	1.76 m (5 ft 9 in)	75 kg (165 lb)	41 – 31 January 1984	TPEC
G	10	(Taiwan)	Lin Tzu-Wei	1.88 m (6 ft 2 in)	82 kg (181 lb)	25 – 12 May 2000	NKNU
G	12	(Taiwan)	Li Chia-Kang	1.85 m (6 ft 1 in)	85 kg (187 lb)	26 – 16 October 1998	NTSU
C	21	(United States)	Alec Brown (I)	2.16 m (7 ft 1 in)	107 kg (236 lb)	33 – 23 July 1992	Green Bay
F	24	(United States)	Treveon Graham (I)	1.98 m (6 ft 6 in)	100 kg (220 lb)	31 – 28 October 1993	VCU
C	25	(Taiwan)	Lin Cheng	2.02 m (6 ft 8 in)	102 kg (225 lb)	25 – 25 July 2000	NTSU
F	27	(Taiwan)	Chang Chen-Ya	1.96 m (6 ft 5 in)	86 kg (190 lb)	25 – 13 October 1999	NCCU
G	30	(Taiwan)	Pai Yao-Cheng	1.84 m (6 ft 0 in)	72 kg (159 lb)	26 – 2 February 1999	I-Shou
C	42	(United States) (Bulgaria)	Jason Washburn (I)	2.13 m (7 ft 0 in)	111 kg (245 lb)	35 – 5 June 1990	Utah
G	69	(Taiwan)	Lu Chun-Hsiang	1.90 m (6 ft 3 in)	82 kg (181 lb)	28 – 15 July 1997	Fu Jen

Head coach

- (Spain) Iurgi Caminos

Assistant coach(es)

- (Taiwan) Huang Chi-Feng
- (Taiwan) Ma Yi-Hung
- (Taiwan) Tang Wei-Jie
- (Taiwan) Yang I-Feng

Strength & conditioning coach(es)

- (Taiwan) Liu Hou-Shao
- (Taiwan) Liu Nien-Chieh

Athletic trainer(s)

- (Taiwan) Peng Li-Chen
- (Taiwan) Wu Yun-Kai

Legend

- (C) Team captain
- (I) Import player
- (FS) Foreign student player
- (HP) Heritage player
- (FA) Free agent
- (DP) Unsigned draft pick
- (AI) EASL Asian import
- (S) Suspended
- Injured

- Roster
Updated: February 7, 2024

== Game log ==
=== Interleague play ===
September 16
5:00pm

boxscore

Taoyuan Pauian Pilots x Formosa Dreamers	59–81	Bank of Taiwan
Scoring by quarter: 14–17, 14–21, 8–23, 23–20
Pts: Chang Wei-Hsiang 17; Rebs: Huang Wei-Cheng 7 Asts: Lin Tzu-Wei 5		Pts: Pan Hsiang-Wei 22; Rebs: Omar Niang 13; Asts: Kao Chien-Yi 5

Taipei Heping Basketball Gymnasium, Taipei City
Referees: Tsai Tsung-Ting, Chuang Chih-Chun, Chen Hsin

September 17
7:00pm

boxscore

Changhua BLL	89–71	Taoyuan Pauian Pilots x Formosa Dreamers
Scoring by quarter: 22–13, 21–25, 21–17, 25–16
Pts: Sugar-Ochir Erdenetsetseg 15; Rebs: Sugar-Ochir Erdenetsetseg 12; Asts: Tsai Houng-Yang 6		Pts: Tung Fang Yi-Kang 14; Rebs: Huang Wei-Cheng 7 Asts: Chang C., Chen L., Chen T. 3 each

Taipei Heping Basketball Gymnasium, Taipei City
Referees: Lin Tsung-Yun, Luo Kuo-Hsien, Chen Hsin

September 18
7:00pm

boxscore

Taoyuan Pauian Pilots x Formosa Dreamers	69–88	Taipei Taishin Mars
Scoring by quarter: 20–22, 24–25, 17–20, 8–21
Pts: Kuan Ta-You 13; Rebs: Hu Chin-Hao 7 Asts: Kuan Ta-You 6		Pts: Tsao Hsun-Hsiang 21; Rebs: Chang Chao-Chen 11; Asts: Tsao Hsun-Hsiang 6

Taipei Heping Basketball Gymnasium, Taipei City

September 19
5:00pm

boxscore

Taoyuan Pauian Pilots x Formosa Dreamers	65–107	NCCU Griffins
Scoring by quarter: 15–31, 13–26, 26–33, 11–17
Pts: Chen Li-Sheng 15; Rebs: Hu Chin-Hao 5 Asts: Chang C., Chen L. 3 each		Pts: Sung Hsin-Hao 19; Rebs: Boubacar Mboup 11; Asts: Yu Ai-Che 10

Taipei Heping Basketball Gymnasium, Taipei City
Referees: He Chang-Jen, Yu Fu-Jung, Lin Yuan-Tien

September 22
5:00pm

boxscore

Taoyuan Pauian Pilots x Formosa Dreamers	68–88	Taiwan Beer
Scoring by quarter: 19–23, 23–26, 14–18, 12–21
Pts: Tung Fang Yi-Kang 17; Rebs: Hu Chin-Hao 6 Asts: Kuan Ta-You 5		Pts: Humphery Gabriel 25; Rebs: Humphery Gabriel 11; Asts: Humphery Gabriel 7

Taipei Heping Basketball Gymnasium, Taipei City
Referees: Chuang Chih-Chun, Lin Tsung-Yun, Chang Chia-Nen

=== The interleague basketball games ===
October 22
2:30pm

Recap

New Taipei CTBC DEA	99–86	Taoyuan Pauian Pilots
Scoring by quarter: 28–25, 26–21, 27–26, 18–14
Pts: Viktor Gaddefors 18; Rebs: Krajina, Morrison, Zekovic 6 each Asts: Wei Chia-Hao 7		Pts: Jason Washburn 24; Rebs: Kennedy Meeks 11; Asts: Lawrence, Washburn 3 each

Intercontinental Basketball Stadium, Taichung City
Referees: Chang Lu-Yueh, Wang Li-Chang, Hsieh Shang-Chien

=== Taoyuan basketball shared arena exhibition game ===
November 13
7:30pm

Taoyuan Pauian Pilots	71–97	Taiwan Beer Leopards

Taoyuan Arena, Taoyuan City

=== Preseason ===
2023 preseason game log
Total: 1–1 (Home: 0–1; Road: 1–0)
Preseason : 1–1 (Home: 0–1; Road: 1–0)

Game	Date	Team	Score	High points	High rebounds	High assists	Location Attendance	Record
1	October 8	@Lioneers	W 91–82	Kennedy Meeks (17)	Kennedy Meeks (12)	Chen, Dieng, Li, Lin T., Meeks, Washburn (2)	Keelung Municipal Stadium; 3,998	1–0
2	October 9	Braves	L 96–102	Jason Washburn (23)	Kennedy Meeks (11)	Jason Washburn (5)	Keelung Municipal Stadium; 4,597	1–1

2023–24 schedule

=== Regular season ===
2023–24 game log
Total: 26–14 (home: 15–5; road: 11–9)
November : 0–2 (Home: 0–0; Road: 0–2)

Game	Date	Team	Score	High points	High rebounds	High assists	Location Attendance	Record
1	November 19	@Kings	L 113–123	Anthony Tucker (26)	Kennedy Meeks (11)	Anthony Tucker (8)	Xinzhuang Gymnasium; 4,086	0–1
2	November 25	@Kings	L 92–98	Jason Washburn (23)	Amdy Dieng (12)	Pai Yao-Cheng (7)	Xinzhuang Gymnasium; 4,592	0–2

December : 4–4 (Home: 2–3; Road: 2–1)

Game	Date	Team	Score	High points	High rebounds	High assists	Location Attendance	Record
3	December 2	@Steelers	W 119–114 (OT)	Jason Washburn (27)	Jason Washburn (18)	Anthony Tucker (14)	Fengshan Arena; 3,681	1–2
4	December 9	Kings	L 86–107	Jason Washburn (21)	Jason Washburn (15)	Pai Yao-Cheng (4)	Taoyuan Arena; 4,288	1–3
5	December 10	Lioneers	L 81–98	Jason Washburn (21)	Jason Washburn (16)	Lu Chun-Hsiang (4)	Taoyuan Arena; 1,596	1–4
6	December 16	Dreamers	L 69–85	Chang Cheng-Ya (19)	Kennedy Meeks (14)	Pai Yao-Cheng (4)	Taoyuan Arena; 1,279	1–5
7	December 17	Kings	W 100–90	Jason Washburn (30)	Kennedy Meeks (17)	Chen, Lin T. (4)	Taoyuan Arena; 3,529	2–5
8	December 19	Steelers	W 81–71	Anthony Tucker (16)	Jason Washburn (13)	Anthony Tucker (11)	Taoyuan Arena; 1,308	3–5
9	December 23	@Lioneers	L 80–93	Lu, Washburn (22)	Jason Washburn (13)	Anthony Tucker (6)	Hsinchu County Stadium; 4,923	3–6
10	December 30	@Steelers	W 110–106(OT)	Anthony Lawrence (24)	Alec Brown (14)	Pai Yao-Cheng (8)	Fengshan Arena; 2,984	4–6

January : 4–3 (Home: 3–2; Road: 1–1)

Game	Date	Team	Score	High points	High rebounds	High assists	Location Attendance	Record
11	January 6	Steelers	L 83–87	Lu Chun-Hsiang (26)	Jason Washburn (22)	Pai Yao-Cheng (4)	Taoyuan Arena; 1,389	4–7
12	January 7	Braves	W 100–71	Lu Chun-Hsiang (19)	Kennedy Meeks (18)	Pai Yao-Cheng (10)	Taoyuan Arena; 2,046	5–7
13	January 9	Braves	W 96–87	Jason Washburn (30)	Jason Washburn (12)	Pai Yao-Cheng (8)	Taoyuan Arena; 1,297	6–7
14	January 14	Steelers	L 82–91	Lawrence, Washburn (20)	Jason Washburn (18)	Lu Chun-Hsiang (4)	Taoyuan Arena; 1,315	6–8
15	January 16	Lioneers	W 94–82	Lu Chun-Hsiang (34)	Jason Washburn (14)	Lu Chun-Hsiang (6)	Taoyuan Arena; 1,477	7–8
16	January 21	@Lioneers	W 83–72	Jason Washburn (22)	Jason Washburn (17)	Lu Chun-Hsiang (6)	Hsinchu County Stadium; 4,622	8–8
17	January 28	@Braves	L 83–106	Lu Chun-Hsiang (20)	Kennedy Meeks (9)	Chen, Chang, Kuan (4)	Taipei Heping Basketball Gymnasium; 5,015	8–9

February : 2–1 (Home: 1–0; Road: 1–1)

Game	Date	Team	Score	High points	High rebounds	High assists	Location Attendance	Record
18	February 4	@Dreamers	L 84–87	Lu Chun-Hsiang (23)	Jason Washburn (11)	Jason Washburn (6)	Changhua County Stadium; 2,888	8–10
19	February 18	@Kings	W 112–97	Lu Chun-Hsiang (29)	Jason Washburn (13)	Chou Yi-Hsiang (7)	Xinzhuang Gymnasium; 4,370	9–10
PPD	February 24	Braves	Postponed					
PPD	February 25	Dreamers	Postponed					
20	February 28	Dreamers	W 93–82	Alec Brown (31)	Jason Washburn (18)	Chou Yi-Hsiang (7)	Taoyuan Arena; 1,987	10–10

March : 8–1 (Home: 6–0; Road: 2–1)

Game	Date	Team	Score	High points	High rebounds	High assists	Location Attendance	Record
21	March 2	Kings	W 94–87	Kennedy Meeks (22)	Kennedy Meeks (17)	Kennedy Meeks (6)	Taoyuan Arena; 3,088	11–10
22	March 3	Braves	W 94–92	Lu Chun-Hsiang (24)	Graham, Washburn (10)	Lu Chun-Hsiang (6)	Taoyuan Arena; 2,159	12–10
23	March 10	@Dreamers	L 88–93	Jason Washburn (33)	Jason Washburn (12)	Chou, Lu, Washburn (4)	Intercontinental Basketball Stadium; 2,678	12–11
24	March 16	@Braves	W 113–92	Jason Washburn (22)	Kennedy Meeks (12)	Kennedy Meeks (6)	Taipei Heping Basketball Gymnasium; 5,590	13–11
25	March 19	@Steelers	W 104–94	Jason Washburn (25)	Jason Washburn (15)	Treveon Graham (6)	Fengshan Arena; 1,568	14–11
26	March 23	Dreamers	W 89–85	Jason Washburn (37)	Jason Washburn (13)	Chou Yi-Hsiang (8)	Taoyuan Arena; 2,386	15–11
27	March 24	Braves	W 98–76	Lu Chun-Hsiang (40)	Kennedy Meeks (15)	Pai Yao-Cheng (7)	Taoyuan Arena; 2,885	16–11
28	March 30	Lioneers	W 96–71	Jason Washburn (21)	Kennedy Meeks (14)	Lu Chun-Hsiang (5)	Taoyuan Arena; 2,845	17–11
29	March 31	Steelers	W 83–79	Jason Washburn (23)	Jason Washburn (20)	Pai Yao-Cheng (6)	Taoyuan Arena; 1,783	18–11

April : 3–2 (Home: 1–0; Road: 2–2)

Game	Date	Team	Score	High points	High rebounds	High assists	Location Attendance	Record
30	April 5	Dreamers	W 96–92	Jason Washburn (24)	Jason Washburn (13)	Lu Chun-Hsiang (5)	Taoyuan Arena; 3,386	19–11
31	April 7	@Braves	W 101–97	Treveon Graham (24)	Kennedy Meeks (11)	Kennedy Meeks (9)	Taipei Heping Basketball Gymnasium; 5,175	20–11
32	April 14	@Dreamers	L 80–97	Jason Washburn (27)	Jason Washburn (15)	Pai Yao-Cheng (4)	Changhua County Stadium; 2,809	20–12
33	April 20	@Lioneers	W 106–96	Jason Washburn (25)	Jason Washburn (12)	Pai Yao-Cheng (7)	Hsinchu County Stadium; 4,307	21–12
34	April 28	@Kings	L 76–94	Jason Washburn (25)	Jason Washburn (14)	Lu Chun-Hsiang (6)	Xinzhuang Gymnasium; 4,216	21–13

May : 5–1 (Home: 2–0; Road: 3–1)

Game	Date	Team	Score	High points	High rebounds	High assists	Location Attendance	Record
35	May 5	@Lioneers	W 100–80	Jason Washburn (26)	Treveon Graham (14)	Graham, Pai (7)	Hsinchu County Stadium; 5,012	22–13
36	May 10	Lioneers	W 98–81	Lu, Washburn (25)	Jason Washburn (17)	Chou Yi-Hsiang (5)	Taoyuan Arena; 1,886	23–13
37	May 12	@Dreamers	W 90–88 (OT)	Kennedy Meeks (30)	Jason Washburn (14)	Pai Yao-Cheng (8)	Intercontinental Basketball Stadium; 3,000	24–13
38	May 15	Kings	W 92–90	Pai Yao-Cheng (20)	Jason Washburn (15)	Pai Yao-Cheng (6)	Taoyuan Arena; 3,072	25–13
39	May 17	@Braves	L 89–92 (OT)	Lu Chun-Hsiang (28)	Jason Washburn (16)	Pai Yao-Cheng (5)	Taipei Heping Basketball Gymnasium; 6,275	25–14
40	May 19	@Steelers	W 90–89	Chang Chen-Ya (17)	Treveon Graham (14)	Lin Tzu-Wei (6)	Fengshan Arena; 3,168	26–14

2023–24 schedule

=== Playoffs ===
2024 playoffs game log
Total: 5–6 (home: 3–3; road: 2–3)
Playoffs : 4–2 (Home: 2–1; Road: 2–1)

Game	Date	Team	Score	High points	High rebounds	High assists	Location Attendance	Record
1	May 23	Lioneers	W 95–82	Lu Chun-Hsiang (24)	Treveon Graham (12)	Lu Chun-Hsiang (7)	Taoyuan Arena; 3,255	1–0
2	May 25	Lioneers	L 102–118	Jason Washburn (25)	Kennedy Meeks (12)	Lu Chun-Hsiang (12)	Taoyuan Arena; 6,088	1–1
3	May 27	@Lioneers	L 95–99	Lu Chun-Hsiang (23)	Jason Washburn (12)	Chou, Lu, Pai (5)	Hsinchu County Stadium; 5,121	1–2
4	May 29	@Lioneers	W 101–88	Treveon Graham (26)	Lin C., Washburn (7)	Lu, Pai (5)	Hsinchu County Stadium; 5,831	2–2
5	May 31	Lioneers	W 97–79	Lu Chun-Hsiang (27)	Jason Washburn (15)	Kuan Ta-You (6)	Taoyuan Arena; 3,848	3–2
6	June 2	@Lioneers	W 98–94	Alec Brown (24)	Alec Brown (11)	Jason Washburn (6)	Hsinchu County Stadium; 6,733	4–2

Finals : 1–4 (Home: 1–2; Road: 0–2)

Game	Date	Team	Score	High points	High rebounds	High assists	Location Attendance	Record
1	June 9	Kings	L 82–89	Alec Brown (17)	Brown, Washburn (9)	Pai Yao-Cheng (7)	Taoyuan Arena; 6,470	0–1
2	June 12	Kings	W 90–70	Lu Chun-Hsiang (18)	Alec Brown (15)	Chou Yi-Hsiang (4)	Taoyuan Arena; 6,470	1–1
3	June 15	@Kings	L 82–83	Alec Brown (22)	Jason Washburn (14)	Chou Yi-Hsiang (5)	Xinzhuang Gymnasium; 6,540	1–2
4	June 17	@Kings	L 82–90	Jason Washburn (19)	Brown, Meeks, Washburn (7)	Meeks, Pai (3)	Xinzhuang Gymnasium; 6,540	1–3
5	June 20	Kings	L 97–103 (OT)	Lu Chun-Hsiang (23)	Treveon Graham (13)	Pai Yao-Cheng (6)	Taoyuan Arena; 6,470	1–4

2023–24 schedule

== Player statistics ==
Legend
GP	Games played	MPG	Minutes per game	2P%	2-point field goal percentage
3P%	3-point field goal percentage	FT%	Free throw percentage	RPG	Rebounds per game
APG	Assists per game	SPG	Steals per game	BPG	Blocks per game
PPG	Points per game		Led the league

=== Regular season ===
Player	GP	MPG	PPG	2P%	3P%	FT%	RPG	APG	SPG	BPG
Alec Brown^{≠}	30	27:19	12.00	44.44%	33.33%	82.61%	7.37	1.03	0.80	1.30
Chang Chen-Ya	36	17:58	5.11	54.17%	33.79%	68.75%	1.58	0.89	0.31	0.08
Chen Yu-Han^{≠}	3	05:50	1.33	100.00%	0.00%	0.00%	0.33	0.33	0.00	0.00
Chen Yu-Jui	37	14:35	3.19	36.67%	23.08%	66.20%	1.68	1.32	0.78	0.08
Chiao Chu-Yu	16	05:14	0.94	50.00%	15.38%	100.00%	0.63	0.19	0.06	0.06
Chou Yi-Hsiang	27	24:39	6.15	26.92%	22.76%	70.91%	2.70	3.04	0.44	0.07
Amdy Dieng	2	28:49	7.00	33.33%	66.67%	80.00%	8.50	1.00	1.00	1.00
Treveon Graham^{≠}	11	26:55	13.82	41.49%	30.91%	57.50%	9.82	3.09	0.91	0.00
Kuan Ta-You	38	12:53	2.53	39.19%	21.88%	77.27%	1.50	1.71	0.58	0.08
Anthony Lawrence^{‡}	5	25:11	16.00	44.00%	25.00%	81.82%	8.80	1.40	2.00	0.40
Lee Hsueh-Lin	15	09:44	0.87	44.44%	50.00%	100.00%	1.00	0.67	0.13	0.00
Li Chia-Kang	33	25:30	6.18	36.75%	25.00%	62.22%	2.67	2.42	1.12	0.03
Lin Cheng	22	12:21	2.55	34.78%	25.00%	40.91%	2.91	0.27	0.41	0.32
Lin Tzu-Wei	18	06:44	1.50	38.46%	9.09%	66.67%	0.61	0.89	0.22	0.00
Lu Chun-Hsiang	37	33:07	16.81	43.45%	30.17%	78.72%	4.14	3.27	1.97	0.16
Kennedy Meeks	29	30:58	16.62	53.87%	36.11%	67.47%	10.76	2.24	1.48	0.72
Pai Yao-Cheng	30	27:06	6.23	44.36%	23.08%	60.00%	3.60	4.87	1.37	0.13
Anthony Tucker^{‡}	8	34:10	16.13	54.35%	27.40%	67.86%	6.88	6.63	2.13	0.38
Jason Washburn	37	36:53	21.86	54.22%	27.03%	77.03%	13.16	2.43	1.14	0.78

^{‡} Waived during the season
^{≠} Acquired during the season

=== Playoffs ===
Player	GP	MPG	PPG	2P%	3P%	FT%	RPG	APG	SPG	BPG
Alec Brown	6	27:50	15.83	45.16%	47.37%	86.67%	7.83	1.00	0.67	1.33
Chang Chen-Ya	5	08:34	4.20	0.00%	42.86%	75.00%	0.60	0.00	0.20	0.00
Chen Yu-Han	Did not play									
Chen Yu-Jui	5	09:28	1.00	25.00%	25.00%	0.00%	2.20	0.80	0.80	0.00
Chiao Chu-Yu	1	00:32	0.00	0.00%	0.00%	0.00%	0.00	0.00	0.00	0.00
Chou Yi-Hsiang	6	19:18	4.83	50.00%	22.22%	87.50%	1.83	2.33	0.17	0.00
Amdy Dieng	Did not play									
Treveon Graham	5	29:19	16.20	47.62%	37.50%	53.85%	6.80	2.00	0.60	0.00
Kuan Ta-You	6	17:15	2.67	66.67%	0.00%	80.00%	2.50	2.67	0.67	0.17
Lee Hsueh-Lin	Did not play									
Li Chia-Kang	6	19:28	7.83	50.00%	47.06%	42.86%	3.00	1.33	1.00	0.00
Lin Cheng	4	18:28	4.25	75.00%	20.00%	100.00%	3.00	1.00	0.50	0.00
Lin Tzu-Wei	1	04:41	2.00	100.00%	0.00%	0.00%	1.00	0.00	0.00	0.00
Lu Chun-Hsiang	6	34:55	19.83	44.44%	27.66%	88.89%	4.00	6.33	1.67	0.33
Kennedy Meeks	1	34:15	17.00	40.00%	0.00%	81.82%	12.00	5.00	1.00	0.00
Pai Yao-Cheng	6	26:41	4.50	50.00%	20.00%	71.43%	2.83	4.17	1.67	0.00
Jason Washburn	6	36:06	18.67	44.44%	21.43%	81.58%	10.17	3.00	0.83	1.00

=== Finals ===
Player	GP	MPG	PPG	2P%	3P%	FT%	RPG	APG	SPG	BPG
Alec Brown	5	30:47	14.20	64.29%	53.85%	66.67%	10.20	1.40	0.60	1.00
Chang Chen-Ya	5	12:47	1.00	50.00%	0.00%	75.00%	0.40	0.40	0.40	0.00
Chen Yu-Han	Did not play									
Chen Yu-Jui	4	03:30	0.25	0.00%	0.00%	50.00%	0.50	1.00	0.25	0.00
Chiao Chu-Yu	Did not play									
Chou Yi-Hsiang	5	28:50	7.20	19.05%	26.09%	100.00%	3.40	3.00	0.40	0.20
Amdy Dieng	Did not play									
Treveon Graham	1	39:53	17.00	57.14%	28.57%	50.00%	13.00	3.00	2.00	0.00
Kuan Ta-You	4	05:29	1.00	40.00%	0.00%	0.00%	0.00	0.75	0.25	0.00
Lee Hsueh-Lin	3	07:02	0.67	33.33%	0.00%	0.00%	1.00	1.33	0.00	0.00
Li Chia-Kang	5	26:27	10.40	37.93%	30.43%	69.23%	4.60	2.00	1.40	0.00
Lin Cheng	2	10:06	1.50	0.00%	100.00%	0.00%	2.00	0.50	0.00	0.00
Lin Tzu-Wei	1	02:19	2.00	100.00%	0.00%	0.00%	0.00	0.00	0.00	0.00
Lu Chun-Hsiang	5	35:39	13.60	38.30%	31.82%	73.33%	3.00	2.40	0.80	0.00
Kennedy Meeks	4	28:56	9.75	40.63%	20.00%	76.92%	8.75	1.50	0.50	0.75
Pai Yao-Cheng	5	27:56	11.00	34.09%	38.46%	66.67%	4.60	4.40	0.80	0.20
Jason Washburn	5	35:28	15.60	53.19%	0.00%	80.00%	10.00	0.80	1.00	0.40

== Transactions ==
=== Trades ===
July 19, 2023
To Taoyuan Pauian Pilots

- Chou Yi-Hsiang
To Kaohsiung 17LIVE Steelers

- Chen Kuan-Chuan
- Shih Chin-Yao
- 2023 first-round 4th pick

=== Free agency ===
==== Re-signed ====
Date	Player	Contract terms	Ref.
September 5, 2023	Jason Washburn	—	

==== Additions ====
Date	Player	Contract terms	Former team	Ref.
August 14, 2023	Chiao Chu-Yu(Qiao Chu-Yu)	—	FJU	
September 13, 2023	Kennedy Meeks	—	(Dominican Republic) Marineros de Puerto Plata	
September 18, 2023	Anthony Lawrence	—	(Japan) SeaHorses Mikawa	
October 20, 2023	Anthony Tucker	—	(United States) Windy City Bulls	
November 15, 2023	Lee Hsueh-Lin	—	New Taipei CTBC DEA	
December 20, 2023	Alec Brown	—	(Puerto Rico) Indios de Mayagüez	
February 2, 2024	Chen Yu-Han	—	Taiwan Beer	
February 7, 2024	Treveon Graham	—	(United States) Motor City Cruise	

==== Subtractions ====
Date	Player	Reason	New team	Ref.
June 30, 2023	Huang Hung-Han	contract expired	New Taipei CTBC DEA	
July 21, 2023	Shih Yen-Tsung	contract terminated	Hsinchu Lioneers	
July 31, 2023	Chieng Li-Huan	contract expired	—	
August 19, 2023	Sani Sakakini	contract expired	(Lebanon) Al Riyadi Club Beirut	
October 5, 2023	Jeff Ayres	contract expired	(Mexico) Freseros de Irapuato	
December 31, 2023	Anthony Tucker	contract terminated	—	
February 6, 2024	Anthony Lawrence	mutual agreement to part ways	(Japan) Yokohama Excellence	

== Awards ==
=== End-of-season awards ===
Recipient	Award	Ref.
Jason Washburn	Rebounds Leader	
Jason Washburn	Mr. Clutch	
Jason Washburn	All-PLG Team	
Jason Washburn	Import Player of the Year	
Iurgi Caminos	Coach of the Year	
Lu Chun-Hsiang	All-Defensive Team	
Lu Chun-Hsiang	All-PLG Team	
Lu Chun-Hsiang	Most Valuable Player	

=== Players of the Week ===
Week	Recipient	Date awarded	Ref.
Week 9	Pai Yao-Cheng	January 6 - January 9	
Week 10	Lu Chun-Hsiang	January 12 - January 16	
Week 11	Jason Washburn	January 20 - January 21	
Week 15	Chou Yi-Hsiang	February 16 - February 18	
Week 16	Alec Brown	February 27 - February 28	
Week 17	Chou Yi-Hsiang	March 2 - March 3	
Week 19	Jason Washburn	March 16 - March 19	
Week 20	Lu Chun-Hsiang	March 23 - March 26	
Week 21	Kennedy Meeks	March 29 - April 2	
Week 27	Pai Yao-Cheng	May 10 - May 15	

=== Players of the Month ===
Recipient	Month awarded	Ref.
Lu Chun-Hsiang	February	
Lu Chun-Hsiang	March	
Jason Washburn	May	
