= 2023–24 Formosa Dreamers season =

Taiwanese professional basketball season

Formosa Dreamers
2023–24 season
- President: Tien Lei
- General Manager: Han Chun-Kai
- Head Coach: Jamie Pearlman
- Arena: Changhua County Stadium; Intercontinental Basketball Stadium
- P. League+: 24–16 (.600)
- Playoffs: Playoffs (lost to Kings 2–4)
- Scoring leader: Julian Boyd (17.41)
- Rebounding leader: Brandon Gilbeck (11.71)
- Assists leader: Lin Chun-Chi (6.15)
- Highest home attendance: 5,600 (February 3, 2024)
- Lowest home attendance: 2,241 (December 3, 2023)
- Average home attendance: 3,693 (Changhua); 2,730 (Taichung)
- Biggest win: Dreamers 93–66 Lioneers (April 27, 2024)
- Biggest defeat: Dreamers 82–114 Kings (January 20, 2024)
- All statistics correct as of June 3, 2024.

The 2023–24 Formosa Dreamers season was the franchise's 7th season, its fourth season in the P. LEAGUE+ (PLG). The Dreamers hired Jamie Pearlman as their new head coach.

== Draft ==
Round	Pick	Player	Position	Status	School/club team
1	3	Ting Kuang-Hao	F	Local	UCH

== Standings ==
Pos	Team	W	L	PCT	GB	Qualification
1	Taoyuan Pauian Pilots	26	14	.650	—	Playoffs
2	Formosa Dreamers	24	16	.600	2	Playoffs
3	New Taipei Kings	22	18	.550	4	Playoffs
4	Hsinchu Toplus Lioneers	21	19	.525	5	Playoffs
5	Taipei Fubon Braves	18	22	.450	8	
6	Kaohsiung 17LIVE Steelers	9	31	.225	17	

Updated to match(es) played on 19 May 2024. Source: P.League+

== Roster ==
2023–24 Formosa Dreamers roster
Players
Coaches

Pos.	No.	Nat.	Name	Ht.	Wt.	Age	From
G	0	(Taiwan)	Chen Jen-Jei	1.83 m (6 ft 0 in)	79 kg (174 lb)	27 – 16 September 1997	Grand View
G	3	(Taiwan)	Wu Chia-Chun	1.74 m (5 ft 9 in)	68 kg (150 lb)	31 – 3 March 1994	NTSU
F	4	(United States)	Devyn Marble (I)	1.98 m (6 ft 6 in)	90 kg (198 lb)	32 – 21 September 1992	Iowa
F	5	(United States)	Chris McCullough (I)	2.08 m (6 ft 10 in)	102 kg (225 lb)	30 – 5 February 1995	Syracuse
F	7	(Taiwan)	Lin Yao-Tsung	1.94 m (6 ft 4 in)	100 kg (220 lb)	34 – 7 September 1990	MingDao
G	8	(Taiwan)	Wang Chen-Yuan	1.76 m (5 ft 9 in)	70 kg (154 lb)	26 – 2 September 1998	NCCU
F	10	(Taiwan)	Ting Kuang-Hao	1.92 m (6 ft 4 in)	90 kg (198 lb)	24 – 23 October 2000	Chien Hsin Tech
G	11	(Taiwan)	Lin Chun-Chi	1.75 m (5 ft 9 in)	70 kg (154 lb)	27 – 29 January 1998	Chien Hsin Tech
G	18	(Taiwan)	Yang Shen-Yen	1.78 m (5 ft 10 in)	80 kg (176 lb)	28 – 18 January 1997	NTSU
F	21	(Taiwan) (United States)	Douglas Creighton	2.00 m (6 ft 7 in)	90 kg (198 lb)	40 – 7 March 1985	Madonna
F	23	(United States) (Taiwan)	Kenneth Chien (HP)	1.85 m (6 ft 1 in)	86 kg (190 lb)	30 – 6 February 1995	Broward
F	24	(United States) (Taiwan)	Randall Walko (HP)	1.96 m (6 ft 5 in)	93 kg (205 lb)	26 – 21 September 1998	TCNJ
C	26	(Taiwan)	Lee Te-Wei	2.00 m (6 ft 7 in)	105 kg (231 lb)	33 – 15 October 1991	Neng Ren VS
F	28	(Taiwan)	Lu Kuan-Liang	1.85 m (6 ft 1 in)	79 kg (174 lb)	34 – 9 April 1991	NTUA
G	30	(Taiwan)	Wu Sung-Wei	1.82 m (6 ft 0 in)	82 kg (181 lb)	32 – 21 May 1993	I-Shou
C	34	(United States)	Brandon Gilbeck (I)	2.13 m (7 ft 0 in)	107 kg (236 lb)	28 – 9 December 1996	Western Illinois
F	42	(United States)	Julian Boyd (I)	2.01 m (6 ft 7 in)	104 kg (229 lb)	35 – 2 February 1990	LIU Brooklyn
F	88	(Taiwan)	Chou Po-Chen	1.98 m (6 ft 6 in)	98 kg (216 lb)	35 – 8 August 1990	NTNU

Head coach

- (Australia) Jamie Pearlman

Assistant coach(es)

- (Taiwan) Lai Po-Lin
- (Taiwan) Chen Shih-Nien

Athletic trainer(s)

- (Taiwan) Hou Yao-Hsin

Legend

- (C) Team captain
- (I) Import player
- (FS) Foreign student player
- (HP) Heritage player
- (FA) Free agent
- (DP) Unsigned draft pick
- (AI) EASL Asian import
- (S) Suspended
- Injured

- Roster
Updated: April 24, 2024

== Game log ==
=== The Interleague Basketball Games ===
October 21
5:00pm

Recap

Formosa Dreamers	107–101	New Taipei CTBC DEA
Scoring by quarter: 31–37, 28–23, 24–19, 24–22
Pts: Lin Chun-Chi 25; Rebs: Giorgi Bezhanishvili 9 Asts: Lin Chun-Chi 5		Pts: Dragan Zekovic 20; Rebs: Viktor Gaddefors 9 Asts: Viktor Gaddefors 9

Intercontinental Basketball Stadium, Taichung City
Referees: Lai Chien-Chung, Yeh Chun-Hung, Chen Chien-Lin

October 22
5:00pm

Recap

Formosa Dreamers	87–84	Kaohsiung Aquas
Scoring by quarter: 33–27, 15–17, 14–21, 25–19

Intercontinental Basketball Stadium, Taichung City
Referees: Chen Hung-Ming, Lin Chien-Hung, Peng Shih-Hsuan

=== Preseason ===
2023 preseason game log
Total: 2–0 (Home: 1–0; Road: 1–0)
Preseason : 2–0 (Home: 1–0; Road: 1–0)

Game	Date	Team	Score	High points	High rebounds	High assists	Location Attendance	Record
1	October 7	Lioneers	W 105–99	Giorgi Bezhanishvili (20)	Julian Boyd (16)	Julian Boyd (4)	Keelung Municipal Stadium; 3,286	1–0
2	October 8	@Kings	W 101–95	Julian Boyd (25)	Giorgi Bezhanishvili (14)	Wu Chia-Chun (7)	Keelung Municipal Stadium; 3,998	2–0

2023–24 schedule

=== Regular season ===
2023–24 game log
Total: 24–16 (home: 15–5; road: 9–11)
November : 2–1 (Home: 1–1; Road: 1–0)

Game	Date	Team	Score	High points	High rebounds	High assists	Location Attendance	Record
1	November 18	Steelers	L 93–101	Julian Boyd (30)	Brandon Gilbeck (13)	Lin Chun-Chi (5)	Changhua County Stadium; 3,134	0–1
2	November 19	Braves	W 89–86	Lin Chun-Chi (24)	Julian Boyd (11)	Kenneth Chien (5)	Changhua County Stadium; 3,639	1–1
3	November 25	@Lioneers	W 91–73	Julian Boyd (28)	Chris McCullough (17)	Lin C., Wu C. (5)	Hsinchu County Stadium; 5,103	2–1

December : 7–0 (Home: 3–0; Road: 4–0)

Game	Date	Team	Score	High points	High rebounds	High assists	Location Attendance	Record
4	December 2	Braves	W 90–76	Julian Boyd (23)	Julian Boyd (17)	Lin C., Wu C. (4)	Intercontinental Basketball Stadium; 3,000	3–1
5	December 3	Lioneers	W 95–73	Giorgi Bezhanishvili (21)	Giorgi Bezhanishvili (13)	Lin Chun-Chi (6)	Intercontinental Basketball Stadium; 2,241	4–1
6	December 10	@Steelers	W 91–90	Brandon Gilbeck (23)	Brandon Gilbeck (14)	Wu Chia-Chun (6)	Fengshan Arena; 2,686	5–1
7	December 16	@Pilots	W 85–69	Brandon Gilbeck (20)	Giorgi Bezhanishvili (12)	Lin Chun-Chi (6)	Taoyuan Arena; 1,279	6–1
8	December 22	Steelers	W 96–79	Randall Walko (26)	Bezhanishvili, Gilbeck (13)	Lin Chun-Chi (5)	Intercontinental Basketball Stadium; 2,811	7–1
9	December 24	@Kings	W 120–104	Chris McCullough (40)	Chris McCullough (18)	Lin Chun-Chi (13)	Xinzhuang Gymnasium; 5,817	8–1
10	December 31	@Steelers	W 109–90	Julian Boyd (25)	Julian Boyd (13)	Lin Chun-Chi (7)	Fengshan Arena; 3,166	9–1

January : 1–5 (Home: 1–2; Road: 0–3)

Game	Date	Team	Score	High points	High rebounds	High assists	Location Attendance	Record
11	January 6	Kings	W 93–76	Julian Boyd (23)	Chris McCullough (16)	Wu Chia-Chun (5)	Changhua County Stadium; 5,111	10–1
12	January 7	Lioneers	L 89–94	Julian Boyd (19)	Julian Boyd (13)	Boyd, Lin C., Lu (4)	Changhua County Stadium; 3,169	10–2
13	January 14	Braves	L 84–94	Chris McCullough (22)	Chris McCullough (16)	Boyd, Lu, McCullough (4)	Intercontinental Basketball Stadium; 3,000	10–3
14	January 20	@Kings	L 82–114	Lin Chun-Chi (18)	Boyd, Gilbeck (6)	Lin Chun-Chi (6)	Xinzhuang Gymnasium; 5,818	10–4
15	January 27	@Braves	L 98–103	Lu Kuan-Liang (25)	Brandon Gilbeck (14)	Devyn Marble (8)	Taipei Heping Basketball Gymnasium; 5,815	10–5
16	January 31	@Braves	L 104–111(OT)	Chris McCullough (35)	Chris McCullough (16)	Lin Chun-Chi (8)	Taipei Heping Basketball Gymnasium; 6,258	10–6

February : 3–1 (Home: 2–0; Road: 1–1)

Game	Date	Team	Score	High points	High rebounds	High assists	Location Attendance	Record
17	February 3	Kings	W 91–70	Randall Walko (22)	Brandon Gilbeck (20)	Lin C., Marble (3)	Changhua County Stadium; 5,600	11–6
18	February 4	Pilots	W 87–84	Brandon Gilbeck (22)	Brandon Gilbeck (15)	Lin Chun-Chi (5)	Changhua County Stadium; 2,888	12–6
19	February 17	@Braves	W 96–73	Devyn Marble (36)	Julian Boyd (11)	Devyn Marble (5)	Taipei Heping Basketball Gymnasium; 5,188	13–6
PPD	February 20	Steelers	Postponed					
PPD	February 25	@Pilots	Postponed					
20	February 28	@Pilots	L 82–93	Devyn Marble (30)	Chris McCullough (11)	Lin Chun-Chi (4)	Taoyuan Arena; 1,987	13–7

March : 6–2 (Home: 3–0; Road: 3–2)

Game	Date	Team	Score	High points	High rebounds	High assists	Location Attendance	Record
21	March 3	@Steelers	W 102–83	Devyn Marble (26)	Brandon Gilbeck (15)	Lin Chun-Chi (8)	Fengshan Arena; 2,328	14–7
22	March 9	Lioneers	W 101–85	Lin Chun-Chi (24)	Brandon Gilbeck (17)	Lin Chun-Chi (6)	Intercontinental Basketball Stadium; 3,000	15–7
23	March 10	Pilots	W 93–88	Lin Chun-Chi (20)	Julian Boyd (12)	Lin Chun-Chi (4)	Intercontinental Basketball Stadium; 2,678	16–7
24	March 17	@Lioneers	L 96–98	Devyn Marble (28)	Brandon Gilbeck (14)	Lin Chun-Chi (6)	Hsinchu County Stadium; 4,798	16–8
25	March 23	@Pilots	L 85–89	Julian Boyd (22)	Chris McCullough (13)	Lin Chun-Chi (8)	Taoyuan Arena; 2,386	16–9
26	March 26	@Kings	W 103–101	Chris McCullough (26)	Chris McCullough (16)	Lin Chun-Chi (11)	Xinzhuang Gymnasium; 3,532	17–9
27	March 29	Steelers	W 117–104	Julian Boyd (32)	Boyd, Gilbeck (9)	Devyn Marble (9)	Intercontinental Basketball Stadium; 2,276	18–9
28	March 31	@Kings	W 108–105	Chris McCullough (27)	Brandon Gilbeck (20)	Lin Chun-Chi (5)	Xinzhuang Gymnasium; 3,964	19–9

April : 4–4 (Home: 4–1; Road: 0–3)

Game	Date	Team	Score	High points	High rebounds	High assists	Location Attendance	Record
29	April 5	@Pilots	L 92–96	Chien, McCullough (16)	Chris McCullough (8)	Lin Chun-Chi (10)	Taoyuan Arena; 3,386	19–10
30	April 7	@Lioneers	L 96–98	Lin Chun-Chi (21)	Brandon Gilbeck (17)	Devyn Marble (7)	Hsinchu County Stadium; 4,675	19–11
31	April 13	Kings	L 94–116	Lin Chun-Chi (22)	Chris McCullough (12)	Lin Chun-Chi (7)	Changhua County Stadium; 3,190	19–12
32	April 14	Pilots	W 97–80	Julian Boyd (18)	Chris McCullough (12)	Lin Chun-Chi (13)	Changhua County Stadium; 2,809	20–12
33	April 19	Kings	W 97–93	Devyn Marble (29)	Chris McCullough (18)	Lin Chun-Chi (8)	Intercontinental Basketball Stadium; 3,000	21–12
34	April 21	@Steelers	L 100–103	Julian Boyd (31)	Chris McCullough (20)	Lin Chun-Chi (5)	Fengshan Arena; 1,653	21–13
35	April 27	Lioneers	W 93–66	Chris McCullough (20)	Brandon Gilbeck (17)	Lin Chun-Chi (5)	Intercontinental Basketball Stadium; 2,482	22–13
36	April 28	Steelers	W 102–99 (OT)	Chris McCullough (38)	Chris McCullough (17)	Lin Chun-Chi (7)	Intercontinental Basketball Stadium; 2,272	23–13

May : 1–3 (Home: 1–1; Road: 0–2)

Game	Date	Team	Score	High points	High rebounds	High assists	Location Attendance	Record
37	May 5	@Braves	L 74–79	Chris McCullough (22)	Boyd, McCullough (18)	Devyn Marble (5)	Taipei Heping Basketball Gymnasium; 5,824	23–14
38	May 11	Braves	W 85–81	Lin Chun-Chi (25)	Chris McCullough (18)	Lin Chun-Chi (8)	Intercontinental Basketball Stadium; 3,000	24–14
39	May 12	Pilots	L 88–90 (OT)	Lin Chun-Chi (20)	Brandon Gilbeck (13)	Lin Chun-Chi (7)	Intercontinental Basketball Stadium; 3,000	24–15
40	May 18	@Lioneers	L 87–99	Julian Boyd (20)	Julian Boyd (10)	Lin Chun-Chi (10)	Hsinchu County Stadium; 5,804	24–16

2023–24 schedule

=== Playoffs ===
2024 playoffs game log
Total: 2–4 (home: 2–1; road: 0–3)
Playoffs : 2–4 (Home: 2–1; Road: 0–3)

Game	Date	Team	Score	High points	High rebounds	High assists	Location Attendance	Record
1	May 24	Kings	W 89–88	Chris McCullough (24)	Chris McCullough (13)	Lin Chun-Chi (6)	Intercontinental Basketball Stadium; 3,000	1–0
2	May 26	Kings	L 86–90	Chris McCullough (23)	Chris McCullough (16)	Devyn Marble (9)	Intercontinental Basketball Stadium; 3,000	1–1
3	May 28	@Kings	L 89–96	Chris McCullough (27)	Chris McCullough (14)	Lin Chun-Chi (7)	Xinzhuang Gymnasium; 6,073	1–2
4	May 30	@Kings	L 73–87	Julian Boyd (25)	Brandon Gilbeck (15)	Lin Chun-Chi (7)	Xinzhuang Gymnasium; 6,394	1–3
5	June 1	Kings	W 96–76	Chris McCullough (19)	Boyd, McCullough (11)	Lin Chun-Chi (10)	Intercontinental Basketball Stadium; 3,000	2–3
6	June 3	@Kings	L 88–97	Chris McCullough (22)	Julian Boyd (11)	Lin Chun-Chi (5)	Xinzhuang Gymnasium; 5,260	2–4

2023–24 schedule

== Player statistics ==
Legend
GP	Games played	MPG	Minutes per game	2P%	2-point field goal percentage
3P%	3-point field goal percentage	FT%	Free throw percentage	RPG	Rebounds per game
APG	Assists per game	SPG	Steals per game	BPG	Blocks per game
PPG	Points per game		Led the league

=== Regular season ===
Player	GP	MPG	PPG	2P%	3P%	FT%	RPG	APG	SPG	BPG
Giorgi Bezhanishvili^{‡}	5	31:38	15.80	56.41%	22.58%	50.00%	11.00	2.60	0.40	0.00
Julian Boyd	34	31:48	17.41	50.97%	27.40%	68.42%	10.50	1.91	1.56	0.97
Chen Jen-Jei	32	21:17	7.38	42.35%	33.08%	80.00%	2.56	0.91	0.72	0.00
Kenneth Chien	35	19:40	4.54	36.89%	21.43%	54.55%	1.83	1.37	0.91	0.09
Chou Po-Chen	23	12:29	1.09	57.14%	22.22%	18.75%	2.43	0.22	0.26	0.26
Douglas Creighton	35	16:50	4.11	33.33%	34.15%	100.00%	2.06	1.03	0.34	0.11
Brandon Gilbeck	38	29:35	11.26	58.46%	0.00%	55.36%	11.71	0.63	0.92	2.50
Lee Te-Wei	15	06:43	1.40	33.33%	33.33%	0.00%	1.20	0.07	0.27	0.00
Lin Chun-Chi	40	32:09	15.48	48.33%	37.17%	81.06%	4.18	6.15	0.80	0.00
Lin Yao-Tsung	8	01:41	0.00	0.00%	0.00%	0.00%	0.50	0.00	0.13	0.00
Lu Kuan-Liang	35	24:25	6.46	41.84%	31.97%	60.00%	2.63	1.80	0.66	0.03
Devyn Marble^{≠}	17	29:41	18.59	50.00%	28.13%	59.60%	5.76	4.41	1.82	0.29
Chris McCullough	26	35:03	20.08	48.68%	27.22%	65.19%	12.81	2.15	1.65	1.00
Ting Kuang-Hao	10	01:54	0.40	40.00%	0.00%	0.00%	0.30	0.10	0.30	0.00
Randall Walko	31	28:12	9.81	38.61%	35.33%	81.67%	4.29	1.29	0.52	0.23
Wang Chen-Yuan^{‡}	3	02:34	0.00	0.00%	0.00%	0.00%	0.00	0.67	0.33	0.00
Wu Chia-Chun	29	15:54	3.14	37.84%	16.67%	85.00%	1.66	2.00	0.62	0.00
Wu Sung-Wei	12	01:22	0.50	0.00%	28.57%	0.00%	0.08	0.00	0.00	0.00
Yang Shen-Yen	9	01:32	0.33	50.00%	0.00%	50.00%	0.33	0.00	0.11	0.00

^{‡} Waived during the season
^{≠} Acquired during the season

=== Playoffs ===
Player	GP	MPG	PPG	2P%	3P%	FT%	RPG	APG	SPG	BPG
Julian Boyd	4	31:17	18.75	50.00%	43.75%	80.00%	11.50	2.25	1.75	0.75
Chen Jen-Jei	6	23:15	8.00	52.17%	28.00%	50.00%	3.33	0.17	0.33	0.00
Kenneth Chien	6	19:22	6.67	38.10%	36.84%	37.50%	1.17	0.33	0.67	0.00
Chou Po-Chen	4	11:46	0.50	100.00%	0.00%	0.00%	1.00	0.00	0.50	0.00
Douglas Creighton	5	12:22	2.20	50.00%	27.27%	0.00%	1.40	1.00	0.40	0.20
Brandon Gilbeck	6	28:33	8.83	58.82%	0.00%	48.15%	9.50	1.17	1.33	1.17
Lee Te-Wei	Did not play									
Lin Chun-Chi	6	29:34	9.83	37.14%	35.29%	83.33%	3.50	6.83	1.17	0.00
Lin Yao-Tsung	1	00:42	0.00	0.00%	0.00%	0.00%	0.00	0.00	0.00	0.00
Lu Kuan-Liang	6	20:59	4.50	30.77%	24.00%	50.00%	2.00	1.50	1.00	0.00
Devyn Marble	3	29:16	12.67	37.50%	21.05%	80.00%	5.33	5.67	0.67	0.00
Chris McCullough	5	36:53	23.00	50.85%	24.24%	52.54%	12.60	0.80	2.40	1.80
Ting Kuang-Hao	Did not play									
Randall Walko	6	23:22	4.17	27.27%	27.78%	80.00%	2.83	0.83	0.50	0.50
Wu Chia-Chun	3	20:30	9.33	33.33%	50.00%	100.00%	2.67	2.67	0.67	0.00
Wu Sung-Wei	1	00:42	0.00	0.00%	0.00%	0.00%	0.00	0.00	0.00	0.00
Yang Shen-Yen	Did not play									

== Transactions ==
=== Overview ===
Players Added

Via draft

- Ting Kuang-Hao

Free agency

- Giorgi Bezhanishvili
- Julian Boyd
- Devyn Marble
- Wang Chen-Yuan
Players Lost

Free agency

- Ilkan Karaman
- Wu Yung-Sheng

Waived

- Giorgi Bezhanishvili
- Wang Chen-Yuan

=== Free Agency ===
==== Re-signed ====
Date	Player	Contract terms	Ref.
July 24, 2023	Randall Walko	2-year contract, worth unknown	
August 4, 2023	Douglas Creighton	2-year contract, worth unknown	
August 4, 2023	Lin Chun-Chi	4-year contract, worth unknown	
August 4, 2023	Wu Sung-Wei	1-year contract, worth unknown	
August 4, 2023	Yang Shen-Yen	2-year contract, worth unknown	
August 15, 2023	Brandon Gilbeck	—	

==== Additions ====
Date	Player	Contract terms	Former team	Ref.
July 26, 2023	Ting Kuang-Hao	—	UCH	
August 30, 2023	Giorgi Bezhanishvili	—	(Canada) Vancouver Bandits	
September 1, 2023	Julian Boyd	—	Changhua BLL	
December 26, 2023	Devyn Marble	—	(Israel) Hapoel Galil Elyon	
April 24, 2024	Wang Chen-Yuan	—	Changhua BLL	

==== Subtractions ====
Date	Player	Reason	New Team	Ref.
June 30, 2023	Wu Yung-Sheng	contract expired	Taipei Fubon Braves	
October 27, 2023	Ilkan Karaman	contract expired	(Turkey) Çayırova Belediyesi	
January 2, 2024	Giorgi Bezhanishvili	contract terminated	(United States) Iowa Wolves	
January 10, 2024	Wang Chen-Yuan	contract terminated	Changhua BLL	

== Awards ==
=== End-of-Season Awards ===
Recipient	Award	Ref.
Brandon Gilbeck	Blocks Leader	
Brandon Gilbeck	All-Defensive Team	
Brandon Gilbeck	Defensive Player of the Year	
Brandon Gilbeck	All-PLG 2nd Team	
Chloe	PLG Cheerleader Ms. Popular	
Han Chun-Kai	GM of the Year	
Randall Walko	All-Defensive Team	
Randall Walko	All-PLG 2nd Team	
Chris McCullough	Comeback Player of the Year	
Lin Chun-Chi	All-PLG Team	

=== Players of the Week ===
Week	Recipient	Date awarded	Ref.
Week 4	Lin Chun-Chi	December 2 - December 3	
Week 7	Chris McCullough	December 22 - December 24	
Week 18	Lin Chun-Chi	March 9 - March 10	
Week 23	Lin Chun-Chi	April 13 - April 14	

=== Players of the Month ===
Recipient	Month awarded	Ref.
Lin Chun-Chi	December	
Lin Chun-Chi	April	
