= Wesam Al-Sous =

Jordanian basketball player

Hsinchu Toplus Lioneers
- Position: Head coach
- League: Taiwan Professional Basketball League

Personal information
- Born: February 24, 1983 (age 43) Jordan
- Listed height: 6 ft 0 in (1.83 m)
- Listed weight: 176 lb (80 kg)

Career history

Coaching
- 2021: Jordan (associate head coach)
- 2021–2024: Jordan
- 2024–present: Hsinchu Toplus Lioneers
- 2026: Jordan
Medals
Men's basketball
Representing Jordan
FIBA Asia Championship
| Bronze medal – third place | 2009 Tianjin | Team |
| Silver medal – second place | 2011 Wuhan | Team |
Head Coach for Jordan
Asian Games
| Silver medal – second place | 2022 Hangzhou |

Wesam Al-Sous (Arabic: وسام الصوص) (born February 24, 1983) is a retired Jordanian professional basketball player. He played for the ASU Club of the Jordanian Basketball League. He is currently serving as the head coach of the Hsinchu Toplus Lioneers of the Taiwan Professional Basketball League (TPBL).

On December 17, 2024, Al-Sous was hired as the head coach of the Hsinchu Toplus Lioneers of the Taiwan Professional Basketball League (TPBL).

On June 16, 2026, the Hsinchu Toplus Lioneers re-signed a multi-year contract with Al-Sous.

Al-Sous competed with the Jordanian team at the FIBA Asia Championship 2007 and FIBA Asia Championship 2009. In 2009, Al-Sous helped the Jordanian team to a national best third-place finish by averaging 3.9 points per game off the bench for the team.
