= 2023–24 Hsinchu Toplus Lioneers season =

Taiwanese professional basketball season

Hsinchu Toplus Lioneers
2023–24 season
- President: Chen Mei-Ling
- General Manager: Chang Shu-Jen
- Head Coach: ~~Lin Kuan-Lun~~ (fired); Milan Mitrovic
- Arena: Hsinchu County Stadium
- P. League+: 21–19 (.525)
- Playoffs: Playoffs (lost to Pilots 2–4)
- Scoring leader: Michael Efevberha (23.03)
- Rebounding leader: Earl Clark (10.77)
- Assists leader: Kao Kuo-Hao (5.27)
- Highest home attendance: 7,400 (February 28, 2024)
- Lowest home attendance: 4,133 (May 1, 2024)
- Average home attendance: 5,174
- Biggest win: Lioneers 97–78 Steelers (March 16, 2024); Lioneers 120–101 Braves (April 2, 2024); Lioneers 128–109 Braves (May 19, 2024)
- Biggest defeat: Lioneers 66–93 Dreamers (April 27, 2024)
- All statistics correct as of June 2, 2024.

The 2023–24 Hsinchu Toplus Lioneers season was the franchise's 4th season, its fourth season in the P. League+ (PLG), its 4th in Hsinchu County. The Lioneers are coached by Lin Kuan-Lun in his fourth year as head coach. The Lioneers named Chang Shu-Jen as their new general manager.

On December 20, 2023, the Lioneers received naming sponsorship via Toplus Global, renamed the team name Hsinchu Toplus Lioneers.

On February 14, 2024, the Lioneers and head coach Lin Kuan-Lun had reached mutual agreement to end the contract, named assistant coach Milan Mitrovic as the new head coach.

== Draft ==
Round	Pick	Player	Position	Status	School/club team
1	1	Joof Alasan	C	Foreign student	NTUA
2	7	Wang Yi-Fan	G	Local	FJU

On August 2, 2023, the Lioneers announced their failure of reaching signing agreement with the first-rounder Joof Alasan. On August 3, 2023, the second-rounder Wang Yi-Fan has signed with Yulon Luxgen Dinos of the Super Basketball League.

== Standings ==
Pos	Team	W	L	PCT	GB	Qualification
1	Taoyuan Pauian Pilots	26	14	.650	—	Playoffs
2	Formosa Dreamers	24	16	.600	2	Playoffs
3	New Taipei Kings	22	18	.550	4	Playoffs
4	Hsinchu Toplus Lioneers	21	19	.525	5	Playoffs
5	Taipei Fubon Braves	18	22	.450	8	
6	Kaohsiung 17LIVE Steelers	9	31	.225	17	

Updated to match(es) played on 19 May 2024. Source: P.League+

== Roster ==
Note: Flags indicate national team eligibility at FIBA-sanctioned events. Players may hold other non-FIBA nationalities not displayed.

2023–24 Hsinchu Toplus Lioneers roster
Players
Coaches

Pos.	No.	Nat.	Name	Ht.	Wt.	Age	From
G	0	(United States)	Jamarcus Mearidy (FS)	1.84 m (6 ft 0 in)	85 kg (187 lb)	29 – 6 September 1997	VNU
F	1	(Taiwan)	Shih Yen-Tsung	1.92 m (6 ft 4 in)	91 kg (201 lb)	34 – 29 May 1992	I-Shou
G	2	(Taiwan)	Chiang Kuang-Chien	1.84 m (6 ft 0 in)	81 kg (179 lb)	28 – 7 May 1998	NTUA
G	3	(Taiwan)	Wang Tzu-Kang	1.83 m (6 ft 0 in)	73 kg (161 lb)	33 – 27 January 1993	NKNU
G	4	(Taiwan)	Kao Kuo-Hao	1.79 m (5 ft 10 in)	76 kg (168 lb)	28 – 22 September 1998	Southeast Missouri State
G	5	(Taiwan)	Sung Yu-Hsuan	1.84 m (6 ft 0 in)	80 kg (176 lb)	36 – 5 December 1989	Chinese Culture
F	6	(United States)	Earl Clark (I)	2.06 m (6 ft 9 in)	106 kg (234 lb)	38 – 17 January 1988	Louisville
G	7	(Taiwan)	Tseng Po-Yu	1.86 m (6 ft 1 in)	89 kg (196 lb)	29 – 3 December 1996	MingDao
F	8	(Taiwan)	Chu Yun-Hao	1.94 m (6 ft 4 in)	90 kg (198 lb)	28 – 3 November 1997	Chien Hsin Tech
G	9	(Taiwan)	Tien Hao	1.73 m (5 ft 8 in)	68 kg (150 lb)	28 – 16 September 1998	NCCU
F	11	(Taiwan)	Hsiao Shun-Yi (C)	1.92 m (6 ft 4 in)	82 kg (181 lb)	33 – 23 October 1992	NTUA
F	12	(Taiwan)	Lee Chia-Jui	2.00 m (6 ft 7 in)	86 kg (190 lb)	31 – 4 December 1994	KLCIVS
F	17	(Taiwan)	Liu Guang-Shang	1.92 m (6 ft 4 in)	88 kg (194 lb)	26 – 30 September 1999	Fu Jen
F	20	(Taiwan)	Chou Po-Hsun	1.97 m (6 ft 6 in)	94 kg (207 lb)	35 – 6 March 1991	MingDao
C	21	(United States)	Deyonta Davis (I)	2.11 m (6 ft 11 in)	108 kg (238 lb)	29 – 2 December 1996	Michigan State
G	23	(Taiwan)	Lu Chi-Min	1.88 m (6 ft 2 in)	87 kg (192 lb)	36 – 27 October 1989	NTUS
G	24	(Nigeria) (United States)	Michael Efevberha (I)	1.93 m (6 ft 4 in)	88 kg (194 lb)	42 – 22 August 1984	Cal State Northridge
G	42	(Taiwan)	Lu Kuan-Hsuan	1.84 m (6 ft 0 in)	88 kg (194 lb)	31 – 2 April 1995	NTNU
C	55	(United States)	Michael Holyfield (I)	2.08 m (6 ft 10 in)	118 kg (260 lb)	33 – 18 November 1992	Sam Houston State

Head coach

- (Serbia) Milan Mitrovic

Assistant coach(es)

- (Taiwan) Chen Tse-Yu
- (Taiwan) Huang Sheng-Fu
- (Taiwan) Seng Hsin-Han
- (Taiwan) Wang Te-Yung

Athletic trainer(s)

- (Taiwan) Huang Chien-Yuan
- (Taiwan) Ou Po-Hung

Legend

- (C) Team captain
- (I) Import player
- (FS) Foreign student player
- (HP) Heritage player
- (FA) Free agent
- (DP) Unsigned draft pick
- (AI) EASL Asian import
- (S) Suspended
- Injured

- Roster
Updated: February 14, 2024

== Game log ==
=== Xiamen Professional Basketball Invitation ===
September 2
18:30 UTC+8

Hsinchu Lioneers	52–67	Cape Town Tigers

Xiamen, Fujian

September 3
18:00 UTC+8

Hsinchu Lioneers	20–0	10 Ten Sports & Entertainment/OTE

Xiamen, Fujian

September 4
20:30 UTC+8

Hsinchu Lioneers	54–69	Nanjing Tongxi Monkey Kings

Xiamen, Fujian

September 5
20:30 UTC+8

Hsinchu Lioneers	20–0	Cape Town Tigers

Xiamen, Fujian

==== Final ====
September 6
20:30 UTC+8

Hsinchu Lioneers	59–56	10 Ten Sports & Entertainment/OTE

Xiamen, Fujian

=== FIBA International Cup Singapore 2023 Exhibition Game ===
September 23
12:00 UTC+8

recap

Hsinchu Lioneers	84–61	Eng Tat Hornets
Scoring by quarter: 25–13, 25–18, 10–13, 24–17
Pts: Mearidy, Ochefu 12 each Rebs: Daniel Ochefu 7 Asts: Tseng Po-Yu 8		Pts: Jackson Mah 12; Rebs: Russel Low 7 Asts: Espinosa, H. Huang, Lim 3 each

Singapore Indoor Stadium, Singapore
Referees: Leong Chuen Wing, Ong Jin Leong, Jeremy Goh

=== 2024 Lioneers Masters Game ===
January 30
19:00 UTC+8

recap

Hsinchu Toplus Lioneers	84–81	Taiwan Beer Leopards
Scoring by quarter: 24–20, 18–24, 31–15, 11–22

Hsinchu County Stadium, Hsinchu County
Referees: Chen Hung-Ming, Yeh Chun-Hung, Chen Chao-Ying

=== Preseason ===
2023 preseason game log
Total: 0–2 (Home: 0–1; Road: 0–1)
Preseason : 0–2 (Home: 0–1; Road: 0–1)

Game	Date	Team	Score	High points	High rebounds	High assists	Location Attendance	Record
1	October 7	@Dreamers	L 99–105	Kao Kuo-Hao (20)	Daniel Ochefu (8)	Kao, Lee (4)	Keelung Municipal Stadium; 3,286	0–1
2	October 8	Pilots	L 82–91	Kao Kuo-Hao (16)	Earl Clark (8)	Kao Kuo-Hao (5)	Keelung Municipal Stadium; 3,998	0–2

2023–24 schedule

=== Regular season ===
2023–24 game log
Total: 21–19 (home: 12–8; road: 9–11)
November : 0–3 (Home: 0–2; Road: 0–1)

Game	Date	Team	Score	High points	High rebounds	High assists	Location Attendance	Record
1	November 18	@Kings	L 87–111	Kao Kuo-Hao (27)	Ivan Marinković (14)	Kao, Shih, Tseng (3)	Xinzhuang Gymnasium; 5,149	0–1
2	November 25	Dreamers	L 73–91	Will Artino (17)	Michael Efevberha (11)	Kao Kuo-Hao (7)	Hsinchu County Stadium; 5,103	0–2
3	November 26	Braves	L 84–99	Kao Kuo-Hao (22)	Will Artino (15)	Kao Kuo-Hao (6)	Hsinchu County Stadium; 4,577	0–3

December : 5–1 (Home: 2–0; Road: 3–1)

Game	Date	Team	Score	High points	High rebounds	High assists	Location Attendance	Record
4	December 3	@Dreamers	L 73–95	Will Artino (21)	Will Artino (16)	Lu Kuan-Hsuan (4)	Intercontinental Basketball Gymnasium; 2,241	0–4
5	December 10	@Pilots	W 98–81	Michael Efevberha (37)	Earl Clark (18)	Kao Kuo-Hao (7)	Taoyuan Arena; 1,596	1–4
6	December 17	@Braves	W 103–102	Michael Efevberha (29)	Michael Holyfield (11)	Michael Efevberha (7)	Taipei Heping Basketball Gymnasium; 5,360	2–4
7	December 23	Pilots	W 93–80	Michael Efevberha (30)	Michael Efevberha (13)	Kao, Tseng (5)	Hsinchu County Stadium; 4,923	3–4
8	December 24	Steelers	W 94–83	Michael Holyfield (22)	Earl Clark (16)	Michael Efevberha (6)	Hsinchu County Stadium; 5,643	4–4
9	December 30	@Kings	W 105–98	Michael Efevberha (24)	Earl Clark (12)	Kao Kuo-Hao (8)	Xinzhuang Gymnasium; 5,853	5–4

January : 2–4 (Home: 1–2; Road: 1–2)

Game	Date	Team	Score	High points	High rebounds	High assists	Location Attendance	Record
10	January 7	@Dreamers	W 94–89	Michael Efevberha (28)	Deyonta Davis (13)	Kao Kuo-Hao (6)	Changhua County Stadium; 3,169	6–4
11	January 12	Kings	L 80–95	Earl Clark (15)	Michael Holyfield (13)	Kao Kuo-Hao (4)	Hsinchu County Stadium; 7,124	6–5
12	January 16	@Pilots	L 82–94	Deyonta Davis (25)	Deyonta Davis (14)	Lu K., Tseng (4)	Taoyuan Arena; 1,477	6–6
13	January 20	Braves	W 77–72	Michael Efevberha (36)	Deyonta Davis (10)	Kao Kuo-Hao (4)	Hsinchu County Stadium; 5,002	7–6
14	January 21	Pilots	L 72–83	Michael Efevberha (21)	Clark, Davis (10)	Earl Clark (4)	Hsinchu County Stadium; 4,622	7–7
15	January 27	@Steelers	L 89–104	Earl Clark (25)	Deyonta Davis (15)	Kao, Mearidy, Tseng (4)	Fengshan Arena; 2,972	7–8

February : 2–2 (Home: 1–0; Road: 1–2)

Game	Date	Team	Score	High points	High rebounds	High assists	Location Attendance	Record
16	February 4	@Braves	L 103–109	Michael Efevberha (30)	Earl Clark (10)	Efevberha, Kao (7)	Taipei Heping Basketball Gymnasium; 6,055	7–9
17	February 16	@Kings	W 97–79	Michael Efevberha (24)	Earl Clark (16)	Kao Kuo-Hao (9)	Xinzhuang Gymnasium; 4,241	8–9
18	February 18	@Braves	L 97–102	Earl Clark (21)	Michael Holyfield (16)	Kao Kuo-Hao (6)	Taipei Heping Basketball Gymnasium; 5,550	8–10
PPD	February 24	Steelers	Postponed					
PPD	February 25	Kings	Postponed					
19	February 28	Kings	W 88–80	Kao Kuo-Hao (20)	Michael Efevberha (18)	Kao Kuo-Hao (7)	Hsinchu County Stadium; 7,400	9–10

March : 3–3 (Home: 2–0; Road: 1–3)

Game	Date	Team	Score	High points	High rebounds	High assists	Location Attendance	Record
20	March 2	@Steelers	W 99–98	Michael Efevberha (31)	Deyonta Davis (13)	Kao Kuo-Hao (8)	Fengshan Arena; 2,525	10–10
21	March 9	@Dreamers	L 85–101	Deyonta Davis (15)	Deyonta Davis (14)	Michael Efevberha (6)	Intercontinental Basketball Gymnasium; 3,000	10–11
22	March 16	Steelers	W 97–78	Michael Efevberha (26)	Michael Holyfield (15)	Efevberha, Kao (5)	Hsinchu County Stadium; 4,266	11–11
23	March 17	Dreamers	W 98–96	Michael Efevberha (26)	Earl Clark (10)	Kao Kuo-Hao (5)	Hsinchu County Stadium; 4,798	12–11
24	March 24	@Steelers	L 103–110	Michael Efevberha (36)	Earl Clark (12)	Kao Kuo-Hao (4)	Fengshan Arena; 1,453	12–12
25	March 30	@Pilots	L 71–96	Michael Holyfield (17)	Michael Holyfield (12)	Michael Efevberha (5)	Taoyuan Arena; 2,845	12–13

April : 5–3 (Home: 3–2; Road: 2–1)

Game	Date	Team	Score	High points	High rebounds	High assists	Location Attendance	Record
26	April 2	@Braves	W 120–101	Earl Clark (30)	Earl Clark (15)	Kao, Lu K. (6)	Taipei Heping Basketball Gymnasium; 5,266	13–13
27	April 6	Steelers	W 115–108	Michael Efevberha (27)	Michael Holyfield (14)	Kao Kuo-Hao (9)	Hsinchu County Stadium; 4,271	14–13
28	April 7	Dreamers	W 98–96	Earl Clark (20)	Michael Holyfield (16)	Kao Kuo-Hao (6)	Hsinchu County Stadium; 4,675	15–13
29	April 13	@Steelers	W 116–110	Michael Efevberha (29)	Michael Holyfield (16)	Kao Kuo-Hao (9)	Fengshan Arena; 2,014	16–13
30	April 20	Pilots	L 96–106	Earl Clark (19)	Michael Holyfield (15)	Tseng Po-Yu (6)	Hsinchu County Stadium; 4,307	16–14
31	April 21	Kings	L 72–94	Michael Holyfield (11)	Davis, Efevberha (14)	Michael Efevberha (6)	Hsinchu County Stadium; 6,203	16–15
32	April 27	@Dreamers	L 66–93	Lu Kuan-Hsuan (14)	Clark, Davis, Lee (6)	Shih Yen-Tsung (5)	Intercontinental Basketball Gymnasium; 2,482	16–16
33	April 30	Braves	W 95–89	Michael Efevberha (44)	Michael Efevberha (13)	Tseng Po-Yu (5)	Hsinchu County Stadium; 4,432	17–16

May : 4–3 (Home: 3–2; Road: 1–1)

Game	Date	Team	Score	High points	High rebounds	High assists	Location Attendance	Record
34	May 1	Steelers	W 116–112	Michael Efevberha (29)	Earl Clark (16)	Efevberha, Tseng (7)	Hsinchu County Stadium; 4,133	18–16
35	May 4	Kings	L 88–98	Tien Hao (18)	Earl Clark (13)	Tien Hao (4)	Hsinchu County Stadium; 6,004	18–17
36	May 5	Pilots	L 80–100	Michael Holyfield (13)	Davis, Holyfield (14)	Tien Hao (6)	Hsinchu County Stadium; 5,012	18–18
37	May 10	@Pilots	L 81–98	Earl Clark (23)	Clark, Efevberha (11)	Lu Kuan-Hsuan (5)	Taoyuan Arena; 1,886	18–19
38	May 12	@Kings	W 105–101	Michael Efevberha (37)	Michael Holyfield (12)	Chou, Efevberha, Lu K. (3)	Xinzhuang Gymnasium; 3,645	19–19
39	May 18	Dreamers	W 99–87	Michael Efevberha (25)	Deyonta Davis (19)	Efevberha, Tseng (7)	Hsinchu County Stadium; 5,804	20–19
40	May 19	Braves	W 128–109	Shih Yen-Tsung (17)	Michael Holyfield (20)	Mearidy, Tien (7)	Hsinchu County Stadium; 5,188	21–19

2023–24 schedule

=== Playoffs ===
2024 playoffs game log
Total: 2–4 (home: 1–2; road: 1–2)
Playoffs : 2–4 (Home: 1–2; Road: 1–2)

Game	Date	Team	Score	High points	High rebounds	High assists	Location Attendance	Record
1	May 23	@Pilots	L 82–95	Michael Holyfield (22)	Michael Holyfield (19)	Michael Efevberha (5)	Taoyuan Arena; 3,255	0–1
2	May 25	@Pilots	W 118–102	Michael Efevberha (38)	Michael Holyfield (14)	Tien Hao (7)	Taoyuan Arena; 6,088	1–1
3	May 27	Pilots	W 99–95	Michael Efevberha (29)	Michael Holyfield (17)	Michael Efevberha (5)	Hsinchu County Stadium; 5,121	2–1
4	May 29	Pilots	L 88–101	Michael Efevberha (29)	Michael Holyfield (19)	Tien Hao (3)	Hsinchu County Stadium; 5,831	2–2
5	May 31	@Pilots	L 79–97	Kao Kuo-Hao (20)	Michael Holyfield (13)	Tseng Po-Yu (4)	Taoyuan Arena; 3,848	2–3
6	June 2	Pilots	L 94–98	Michael Holyfield (25)	Deyonta Davis (15)	Tien Hao (7)	Hsinchu County Stadium; 6,733	2–4

2023–24 schedule

== Player statistics ==
Legend
GP	Games played	MPG	Minutes per game	2P%	2-point field goal percentage
3P%	3-point field goal percentage	FT%	Free throw percentage	RPG	Rebounds per game
APG	Assists per game	SPG	Steals per game	BPG	Blocks per game
PPG	Points per game		Led the league

=== Regular season ===
Player	GP	MPG	PPG	2P%	3P%	FT%	RPG	APG	SPG	BPG
Will Artino^{‡}	3	31:22	16.67	51.22%	20.00%	38.46%	13.33	1.00	0.67	0.67
Chiang Kuang-Chien	5	05:15	2.20	50.00%	40.00%	33.33%	0.00	0.40	0.20	0.00
Chou Po-Hsun	33	13:20	1.91	40.43%	28.57%	68.42%	2.64	0.58	0.36	0.12
Chu Yun-Hao	39	18:26	6.28	42.11%	35.86%	59.52%	1.79	0.74	0.59	0.21
Earl Clark	30	34:10	15.77	39.87%	36.36%	73.91%	10.77	2.00	0.73	1.90
Deyonta Davis^{≠}	22	28:25	13.18	66.26%	23.19%	68.42%	11.09	0.95	1.32	1.95
Michael Efevberha	31	35:39	23.03	45.55%	31.67%	83.16%	7.97	3.65	1.77	0.87
Michael Holyfield^{≠}	28	21:33	10.93	57.59%	0.00%	52.44%	10.71	0.68	0.50	1.04
Hsiao Shun-Yi	26	17:58	5.12	41.49%	24.44%	66.67%	2.65	0.73	0.92	0.19
Kao Kuo-Hao	30	35:23	13.17	41.67%	34.59%	73.44%	4.30	5.27	1.50	0.03
Lee Chia-Jui	33	13:15	4.12	33.33%	28.57%	77.78%	2.42	0.52	0.39	0.30
Liu Kuang-Shang	1	08:48	2.00	33.33%	0.00%	0.00%	2.00	1.00	1.00	0.00
Lu Chi-Min	5	09:24	3.40	40.00%	40.00%	25.00%	0.80	0.80	0.40	0.00
Lu Kuan-Hsuan	40	23:24	5.73	46.24%	30.56%	73.33%	1.85	1.80	0.70	0.00
Ivan Marinkovic^{‡}	3	24:09	7.33	36.00%	0.00%	44.44%	8.00	0.67	1.00	0.33
Jamarcus Mearidy	23	10:46	4.65	38.46%	16.67%	75.68%	2.52	1.78	0.78	0.04
Daniel Ochefu^{‡}	1	25:20	4.00	28.57%	0.00%	0.00%	7.00	1.00	2.00	0.00
Shih Yen-Tsung	27	11:05	2.41	42.31%	29.73%	50.00%	2.00	0.59	0.37	0.11
Sung Yu-Hsuan	2	08:02	5.00	83.33%	0.00%	0.00%	0.00	0.50	0.50	0.00
Tien Hao	23	11:18	4.13	34.69%	41.67%	76.19%	0.91	1.78	0.52	0.00
Tseng Po-Yu	39	23:03	7.15	43.33%	30.95%	68.18%	2.46	2.79	0.49	0.03
Wang Tzu-Kang	19	09:34	3.74	57.89%	28.07%	50.00%	0.68	0.53	0.21	0.00

^{‡} Waived during the season
^{≠} Acquired during the season

=== Playoffs ===
Player	GP	MPG	PPG	2P%	3P%	FT%	RPG	APG	SPG	BPG
Chiang Kuang-Chien	1	05:15	3.00	0.00%	50.00%	0.00%	0.00	0.00	0.00	0.00
Chou Po-Hsun	4	08:16	2.25	80.00%	0.00%	50.00%	1.50	1.00	0.75	0.00
Chu Yun-Hao	6	32:42	8.33	40.00%	35.14%	75.00%	5.00	1.67	0.83	0.50
Earl Clark	Did not play									
Deyonta Davis	6	27:07	9.83	55.56%	20.00%	0.00%	9.00	1.00	0.83	1.17
Michael Efevberha	6	32:27	19.50	36.17%	37.78%	88.89%	5.00	3.17	1.33	1.17
Michael Holyfield	6	25:50	14.50	62.50%	0.00%	57.45%	15.17	0.33	1.00	1.33
Hsiao Shun-Yi	Did not play									
Kao Kuo-Hao	6	17:13	8.00	26.09%	39.13%	75.00%	1.83	1.67	0.50	0.00
Lee Chia-Jui	6	20:48	5.50	16.67%	42.11%	50.00%	3.00	0.83	0.33	0.50
Liu Kuang-Shang	Did not play									
Lu Chi-Min	1	08:52	0.00	0.00%	0.00%	0.00%	0.00	0.00	0.00	0.00
Lu Kuan-Hsuan	6	21:49	9.33	57.89%	40.00%	80.00%	1.33	1.00	1.33	0.00
Jamarcus Mearidy	3	04:52	0.67	20.00%	0.00%	0.00%	1.67	1.00	0.33	0.00
Shih Yen-Tsung	6	06:23	1.17	11.11%	14.29%	100.00%	2.00	0.33	0.00	0.00
Sung Yu-Hsuan	Did not play									
Tien Hao	5	21:38	6.80	36.84%	42.86%	40.00%	1.80	4.60	1.00	0.00
Tseng Po-Yu	6	22:46	8.83	48.39%	36.36%	61.11%	2.00	2.50	0.83	0.17
Wang Tzu-Kang	3	09:00	0.67	20.00%	0.00%	0.00%	1.00	1.00	0.00	0.00

== Transactions ==
=== Free Agency ===
==== Re-signed ====
Date	Player	Contract terms	Ref.
July 3, 2023	Hsiao Shun-Yi	2-year contract, worth unknown	

==== Additions ====
Date	Player	Contract terms	Former team	Ref.
July 6, 2023	Wang Tzu-Kang	—N/a	Taiwan Beer	
August 1, 2023	Liu Guang-Shang	—N/a	FJU	
August 3, 2023	Chou Po-Hsun	—N/a	TaiwanBeer HeroBears	
August 15, 2023	Lin Ping-Sheng	—N/a	New Taipei CTBC DEA	
August 17, 2023	Taylor Braun	—N/a	Tainan TSG GhostHawks	
September 14, 2023	Shih Yen-Tsung	—N/a	Taoyuan Pauian Pilots	
September 18, 2023	Jamarcus Mearidy	—N/a	Kaohsiung 17LIVE Steelers	
September 20, 2023	Daniel Ochefu	—N/a	(Lebanon) Al Riyadi Club Beirut	
October 5, 2023	Earl Clark	—N/a	(Puerto Rico) Gigantes de Carolina	
November 4, 2023	Lu Kuan-Hsuan	—N/a	Taichung Suns	
November 14, 2023	Ivan Marinković	—N/a	(Belgium) Antwerp Giants	
November 16, 2023	Michael Efevberha	—N/a	Taoyuan Leopards	
December 6, 2023	Michael Holyfield	—N/a	(Israel) Hapoel Hevel Modi'in	
December 28, 2023	Deyonta Davis	—N/a	(South Korea) Goyang Sono Skygunners	

==== Subtractions ====
Date	Player	Reason	New Team	Ref.
—N/a	Chen Tse-Yu	—N/a	—N/a	
May 22, 2023	Jeremy Tyler	—N/a	(Puerto Rico) Indios de Mayagüez	
June 1, 2023	Kuo Shao-Chieh	contract expired	Tainan TSG GhostHawks	
July 7, 2023	Ifeanyi Eboka	mutual agreement to part ways	Taipei Fubon Braves	
July 29, 2023	Anthony Bennett	—N/a	(South Korea) Goyang Sono Skygunners	
November 10, 2023	Taylor Braun	—N/a	Taipei Fubon Braves	
December 1, 2023	Daniel Ochefu	mutual agreement to part ways	(Mongolia) Bishrelt Metal	
December 12, 2023	Ivan Marinković	injury	(Lithuania) BC Jonava	
January 30, 2024	Will Artino	mutual agreement to part ways	—N/a	

== Awards ==
=== End-of-season awards ===
Recipient	Award	Ref.
Michael Efevberha	Points Leader	
Hsinchu Toplus Lioneers	Best Home Court	
Kao Kuo-Hao	All-Defensive Team	
Kao Kuo-Hao	All-PLG Team	
Tseng Po-Yu	Most Improved Player	
Tseng Po-Yu	6th Man of the Year	

=== Players of the Week ===
Week	Recipient	Date awarded	Ref.
Week 5	Michael Efevberha	December 9 - December 10	
Week 6	Kao Kuo-Hao	December 16 - December 19	
Week 8	Kao Kuo-Hao	December 30 - December 31	
Week 25	Michael Efevberha	April 27 - May 1	
Week 28	Lee Chia-Jui	May 17 - May 19	
