= Alec Brown =

American basketball player (born 1992)

No. 21 – Taoyuan Pauian Pilots
- Position: Power forward / center
- League: P. League+

Personal information
- Born: July 23, 1992 (age 34) Winona, Minnesota, U.S.
- Listed height: 7 ft 1 in (2.16 m)
- Listed weight: 231 lb (105 kg)

Career information
- High school: Winona (Winona, Minnesota)
- College: Green Bay (2010–2014)
- NBA draft: 2014: 2nd round, 50th overall pick
- Drafted by: Phoenix Suns
- Playing career: 2015–present

Career history
- 2015: Bakersfield Jam
- 2015–2016: Río Natura Monbús Obradoiro
- 2016–2017: Windy City Bulls
- 2017–2018: Estudiantes
- 2018–2019: Breogán
- 2019: Nizhny Novgorod
- 2019–2020: Telekom Baskets Bonn
- 2020–2021: Estudiantes
- 2021–2022: BC Budivelnyk
- 2022: Semt77 Yalovaspor
- 2022–2023: BC Budivelnyk
- 2023: Indios de Mayagüez
- 2023–present: Taoyuan Pauian Pilots

Career highlights
- 2× P. League+ champion (2025, 2026); P. League+ Finals MVP (2026); 2× P. League+ Import Player of the Year (2025, 2026); P. League+ Defensive Player of the Year (2026); 2× First-team All-P. League+ (2025, 2026); Defensive First-team All-P. League+ (2026); P. League+ blocks leader (2026); 2× First-team All-Horizon League (2012, 2014); Horizon League Defensive Player of the Year (2014)
- Stats at Basketball Reference
Medals
Men's basketball
Representing United States
FIBA AmeriCup
Gold medal – first place	2017 Argentina

Alec Thomas Brown (born July 23, 1992) is an American professional basketball player for Taoyuan Pauian Pilots of the P. League+. He played college basketball at the University of Wisconsin–Green Bay. Brown was drafted 50th overall in the 2014 NBA draft by the Phoenix Suns, though he never appeared in a game with the team. Brown subsequently played for the NBA G League franchises of the Suns and Chicago Bulls before playing in Europe.

== High school career ==
Brown attended Winona Senior High School in Winona, Minnesota. As a junior, he averaged 14.2 points and 7.0 rebounds per game. In his senior year, he averaged 22.4 points, 9.8 rebounds and 4.9 blocks per game. He led his school to a record of 29–2 and finished third in the class AAA State Tournament. On January 8, 2010, Brown recorded a triple-double with 22 points, 12 rebounds and 12 blocks against Mankato West High School. He was named "Winona Daily News Player of the Year", was also named to the AP all-state 1st team, the class AAA all-tournament team at the State Tournament, and to the 1st team all-Big 9 Conference. During his high school career he set seven Winona records, such as points in a game (44), points in a season (650), blocks in a game (13), blocks in a season (141), field goals in a game (18), field goals scored in one season (247), and free throws scored in one season (152). Considered a three-star recruit by Rivals.com, Brown was listed as the No. 31 center in the nation in 2010.

== College career ==
Standing 7 feet 1 inch tall, Brown became the first seven-footer to sign with Green Bay. He started for the Phoenix as a freshman and set the school single game mark for blocked shots. Over his four-year career, Brown was twice named first team All-Horizon League (in 2012 and 2014) and as a senior was named conference Defensive Player of the Year.

Brown graduated and left Green Bay as the school's career leader in blocked shots (309 – also tied for the modern-day Horizon League record) and scored 1,678 points and collected 800 rebounds.

== Professional career ==
=== Bakersfield Jam (2015) ===
Following the completion of his college career, Brown trained to prepare for 2014 NBA draft workouts. He gained attention at the NBA Draft Combine in Chicago, measuring a full seven feet tall without shoes and enjoying one of the top shooting performances of any player, including hitting 18 of 25 NBA-range three-pointers in standing shooting drills. On June 26, 2014, he was selected with the 50th overall pick in the 2014 NBA draft by the Phoenix Suns. In July 2014, he joined the Suns for the 2014 NBA Summer League. During the Suns' final Summer League game, Brown injured his left shoulder during the first quarter of the team's blowout loss to the Dallas Mavericks. After undergoing surgery on July 24, he was ruled out for at least 3–4 months. He signed a contract with the Suns on September 14, 2014, but was waived by the team three days later. Brown had initially planned to play for Obradoiro CAB in the Liga ACB once his shoulder was fully healed. However, after taking extra time off to rehabilitate the same shoulder that gave him problems during his senior year at Green Bay, Brown eventually filed paper work with the NBA G League and entered the league's player pool. On February 16, 2015, he was acquired by the Bakersfield Jam, the Suns' G-League affiliate. The next day, he made his debut for the Jam, recording six points and five blocks in the 120–109 win over the Los Angeles D-Fenders. During his time with the Jam, he averaged 7.0 points, 3.5 rebounds and 2.0 blocks in 20 games.

=== Río Natura Monbús Obradoiro (2015–2016) ===
In July 2015, Brown re-joined the Phoenix Suns for the 2015 Las Vegas Summer League. On July 31, he signed with Obradoiro CAB of Spain for the 2015–16 season. In 29 games for Obradoiro, he averaged 6.1 points and 2.9 rebounds per game.

=== Windy City Bulls (2016–2017) ===
In July 2016, Brown again joined Suns for the 2016 Las Vegas Summer League. In September, 2016, the Suns renounced to his draft rights and on October 29, the Suns' D-League affiliate, the Northern Arizona Suns, traded his player rights to the Windy City Bulls. He subsequently joined Windy City's training camp roster, and went on to make the opening night roster. He made his debut for the Bulls on November 11, 2016, recording 17 points, six rebounds and three blocks in a 123–94 win over the Long Island Nets.

=== Movistar Estudiantes (2017–2018) ===
On April 6, 2017, he signed with Spanish club Movistar Estudiantes for the rest of the 2016–17 ACB season.

In July 2017, Brown played in the NBA Summer League for the Los Angeles Lakers.

=== Breogán (2018–2019) ===
On July 31, 2018, Brown signed with Breogán.

=== Nizhny Novgorod (2019) ===
On July 25, 2019, Brown signed with BC Nizhny Novgorod of the VTB United League.

=== Telekom Baskets Bonn (2019–2020) ===
On December 27, 2019, Brown signed with Telekom Baskets Bonn of the Basketball Bundesliga.

=== Second stint with Estudiantes (2020–2021) ===
On July 1, 2020, Brown returned to Spain, signing with Estudiantes in Liga Endesa. He averaged 8.1 points, 3.9 rebounds, and 1.2 blocks per game.

=== BC Budivelnyk (2021–2022) ===
On August 21, 2021, Brown signed with BC Budivelnyk of the Ukrainian Basketball SuperLeague.

=== Yalovaspor (2022) ===
On March 8, 2022, he has signed with Semt77 Yalovaspor of the Turkish Basketball Super League.

=== Return to Budivelnyk (2022–2023) ===
On August 7, 2022, he has signed with BC Budivelnyk of the European North Basketball League.

=== Indios de Mayagüez (2023) ===
On April 19, 2023, Brown signed with the Indios de Mayagüez of the Baloncesto Superior Nacional (BSN) for the 2023 season.

=== Taoyuan Pauian Pilots (2023–present) ===
On December 20, 2023, Brown signed with the Taoyuan Pauian Pilots of the P. League+. On July 31, 2024, he re-signed with the Taoyuan Pauian Pilots. In 2024-25, Brown led the Pilots to the P. League+ Championship defeating the Taipei Fubon Braves 4 games to 3 in a seven-game series. Brown was named Import Player of the Year during the regular season. The Pilots would repeat as P. League+ champions in 2025-26, again defeating the Taipei Fubon Braves 4-3. The Pilots also finished as runner-up in both the EASL Championship and BCL Asia East Championships. Brown won Defensive Player of the Year awards in both the P. League+ and EASL, also finishing on the 1st team all-defense in both leagues. He also was named Import Player of the year in the P. League+ for the second consecutive season. Finally, Brown was named Finals MVP of the P. League+ Championship.

== National team ==
Brown played with the senior United States national team at the 2017 FIBA AmeriCup, where he won a gold medal.

== Career statistics ==
International

Season	Team	GP	MPG	FG%	3P%	FT%	RPG	APG	SPG	BPG	PPG
2025-26	Taoyuan Pilots	46	31.3	.488	.412	.783	8.5	2.4	1.1	2.0	16.2
2024-25	Taoyuan Pilots	40	31.7	.488	.415	.776	9.2	1.5	0.9	2.3	17.1
2023-24	Taoyuan Pilots	41	28.1	.422	.370	.792	7.8	1.1	0.8	1.3	12.8
2022-23	BC Budivelnyk	24	18.1	.440	.390	.632	4.1	0.9	0.5	0.6	7.2
2021-22	BC Budivelnyk	38	25.3	.468	.388	.735	5.6	0.7	0.6	1.5	10.3
2020-21	Movistar Estudiantes	36	22.7	.430	.396	.769	3.9	0.4	0.3	1.2	8.1
2018–19	Breogan	31	23.8	.467	.411	.814	5.8	0.8	0.8	1.6	10.6
2017–18	Movistar Estudiantes	50	21.4	.454	.351	.823	4.6	0.8	0.6	1.1	11.0
2015-16	Obradoiro CAB	29	15.9	.480	.415	.750	2.9	0.2	0.2	0.5	6.1

=== NBA G-League ===
Season	Team	GP	MPG	FG%	3P%	FT%	RPG	APG	SPG	BPG	PPG
2016–17	Windy City Bulls	50	23.4	.476	.364	.810	5.2	.9	.7	1.9	10.7
2014–15	Bakersfield Jam	20	18.0	.458	.354	.793	3.5	1.0	.4	2.0	7.0
