= Hsinchu Toplus Lioneers =

Professional basketball team in Taiwan

- 2026–27 Hsinchu Toplus Lioneers season
- Leagues: Taiwan Professional Basketball League
- Founded: September 17, 2020
- History: Hsinchu JKO Lioneers; 2020–2023 (PLG); Hsinchu Toplus Lioneers; 2023–2024 (PLG); 2024–present (TPBL)
- Arena: Hsinchu County Stadium
- Capacity: 8,000
- Location: Hsinchu County
- Team colors: Purple, black, blue
- Main sponsor: Toplus Global
- President: Vacant
- General manager: Chang Shu-Jen
- Head coach: Wesam Al-Sous
- Ownership: Bros Sports Marketing
- Championships: 0
- Website: lioneers.tpbl.basketball

Hsinchu Toplus Lioneers (Chinese: 新竹御嵿攻城獅) are a Taiwanese professional basketball team based in Hsinchu County. They have competed in the Taiwan Professional Basketball League (TPBL) and play their home games at the Hsinchu County Stadium. The Lioneers became one of the four teams of the inaugural P. League+ season, and one of the seven teams of the inaugural TPBL season.

== Franchise history ==
On July 9, 2024, the Hsinchu Toplus Lioneers announced to join the Taiwan Professional Basketball League (TPBL).

== Facilities ==
=== Home arenas ===
Arena	Location	Duration
Hsinchu County Stadium	Hsinchu County	2020–present

=== Training facilities ===
The Lioneers' training facility is located at the Lioneers Hub, which is opened on November 18, 2021, and it's built near Hsinchu County Stadium. The construction cost approximately $45 million TWD.

== Current roster ==
Hsinchu Toplus Lioneers roster
Players
Coaches

Pos.	No.	Nat.	Name	Ht.	Wt.	Age	From
PG	1	(United States) (Taiwan)	Jade Tse	1.85 m (6 ft 1 in)	86 kg (190 lb)	26 – 19 March 2000	Queens
PF/C	2	(United States)	Drew Pember (I)	2.10 m (6 ft 11 in)	95 kg (209 lb)	26 – 14 June 2000	UNC Asheville
PG	3	(Taiwan)	Chen Li-Sheng	1.75 m (5 ft 9 in)	72 kg (159 lb)	24 – 16 September 2002	NTSU
F	6	(United States) (Taiwan)	Benjamin Cheung	1.91 m (6 ft 3 in)	89 kg (196 lb)	23 – 25 September 2003	Occidental
PG	7	(Taiwan)	Tseng Po-Yu (C)	1.84 m (6 ft 0 in)	88 kg (194 lb)	29 – 3 December 1996	MDU
SG	8	(Taiwan)	Wang Lu-Hsiang	1.84 m (6 ft 0 in)	84 kg (185 lb)	28 – 21 December 1997	CCUT
SG	13	(Taiwan)	Liu Cheng-Hsun	1.90 m (6 ft 3 in)	92 kg (203 lb)	23 – 10 April 2003	UCH
SG	14	(Taiwan)	Fu Yu	1.88 m (6 ft 2 in)	85 kg (187 lb)	22 – 27 February 2004	West Virginia Tech
PF	17	(Taiwan)	Tsai Cheng-Kang	1.97 m (6 ft 6 in)	98 kg (216 lb)	24 – 8 November 2002	UCH
PF	25	(Taiwan) (Germany)	Karl Breuer	1.90 m (6 ft 3 in)	90 kg (198 lb)	25 – 19 April 2001	NTUA
SF	28	(Taiwan)	Chu Yun-Hao	1.95 m (6 ft 5 in)	97 kg (214 lb)	29 – 3 November 1997	UCH
C	32	(United States)	Justin Alston (I)	2.04 m (6 ft 8 in)	104 kg (229 lb)	32 – 2 July 1994	Boston University
C	33	(Mali)	Cheick Diallo (I)	2.03 m (6 ft 8 in)	99 kg (218 lb)	30 – 13 September 1996	Kansas
C	35	(Canada)	Sim Bhullar (I)	2.26 m (7 ft 5 in)	140 kg (309 lb)	33 – 2 December 1992	New Mexico State
PF	41	(Taiwan)	Su Yi-Chin	1.95 m (6 ft 5 in)	95 kg (209 lb)	32 – 29 December 1993	MDU
SG	42	(Taiwan)	Lu Kuan-Hsuan (C)	1.84 m (6 ft 0 in)	92 kg (203 lb)	31 – 2 April 1995	NTNU

Head coach

- (Jordan) (United States) Wesam Al-Sous

Assistant coach(es)

- (United States) Jacob Tyler
- (Taiwan) Chen Tse-Yu
- (Taiwan) Kuo Yen-En

Strength & conditioning coach(es)

- (Taiwan) Chen Hung-Lin
- (Taiwan) Chu Ming-Han

Athletic trainer(s)

- (Taiwan) Ou Po-Hung
- (Taiwan) Hsu Teng-Wen

Physician(s)

- (Taiwan) Ou Po-Hung
- (Taiwan) Hsu Teng-Wen

Team manager

- (Taiwan) Chang Shu-Jen

Legend

- (C) Team captain
- (I) Import player
- Injured

- Roster
- Transactions
Updated: October 26, 2026

== Season-by-season record ==
Season	League	Coach	Regular season				Postseason	Asian competition					
Season	League	Coach	Won	Lost	Win %	Finish	Postseason	League	Won	Lost	Win %	Finish	Result
2020–21	PLG	Lin Kuan-Lun	9	15	.375	4th	Did not qualify	Did not participate					
2021–22	PLG	Lin Kuan-Lun	20	10	.667	1st	Won playoffs (Kings) 3–2; Lost finals (Braves) 1–4	Did not participate					
2022–23	PLG	Lin Kuan-Lun	13	27	.325	6th	Did not qualify	Did not participate					
2023–24	PLG	Lin Kuan-Lun	21	19	.525	4th	Lost playoffs (Pilots) 2–4	Did not participate					
2023–24	PLG	Milan Mitrovic	21	19	.525	4th	Lost playoffs (Pilots) 2–4	Did not participate					
2024–25	TPBL	Milan Mitrovic	12	24	.333	7th	Did not qualify	Did not participate					
2024–25	TPBL	Seng Hsin-Han	12	24	.333	7th	Did not qualify	Did not participate					
2024–25	TPBL	Wesam Al-Sous	12	24	.333	7th	Did not qualify	Did not participate					
2025–26	TPBL	Wesam Al-Sous	22	14	.611	3rd	Lost semifinals (Dreamers) 1–3	Did not participate					
2026–27	TPBL	Wesam Al-Sous	1	2	.333			Did not participate					
Totals			98	111	.469	–	3 Playoff appearances	–	0	0	–	–	0 Playoff appearances

== Notable players ==
Local players

- (Taiwan) (United States) Chieng Li-Huan (成力煥) – Chinese Taipei national team player
- (Taiwan) Chou Po-Hsun (周伯勳) – Chinese Taipei national team player
- (Taiwan) Lee Chi-Wei (李啟瑋) – Chinese Taipei national team player
- (Taiwan) Li Han-sheng (李漢昇) – Chinese Taipei national team player
- (Taiwan) Lin Yi-Huei (林宜輝) – Chinese Taipei national team player
- (Taiwan) Lu Chi-Min (呂奇旻) – Chinese Taipei national team player
- (Taiwan) Su Yi-Chin (蘇奕晉) – Chinese Taipei national team player
- (Taiwan) Wu Tai-Hao (吳岱豪) – Chinese Taipei national team player

Import players

- (United States) (Taiwan) William Artino – Chinese Taipei national team player
- Anthony Bennett – NBA player, Canada national team player
- (Canada) Sim Bhullar – NBA player
- (United States) Earl Clark – NBA player
- (United States) Deyonta Davis – NBA player
- (United States) Branden Dawson – NBA player
- (Mali) Cheick Diallo – NBA player
- (United States) Michael Efevberha – Nigeria national team player
- Marin Marić – Croatia national team player
- Kennedy Meeks – United States national team player
- (United States) Daniel Ochefu – NBA player, Nigeria national team player
- Anžejs Pasečņiks – NBA player, Latvia national team player
- Craig Sword – NBA player, United States national team player
- (Tanzania) Hasheem Thabeet – NBA player
- (United States) Dar Tucker – Jordan national team player, LNB MVP (2017), LNB Finals MVP (2019), LDA Grand Final MVP (2019)
- (United States) Jeremy Tyler – NBA player
- (United States) Terrico White – KBL Finals MVP (2018), NBL Finals MVP (2019)
- (United States) Julian Wright – NBA player
