= Hsinchu County Stadium =

Stadium in Zhubei, Hsinchu County, Taiwan

Hsinchu County Stadium 新竹縣體育館
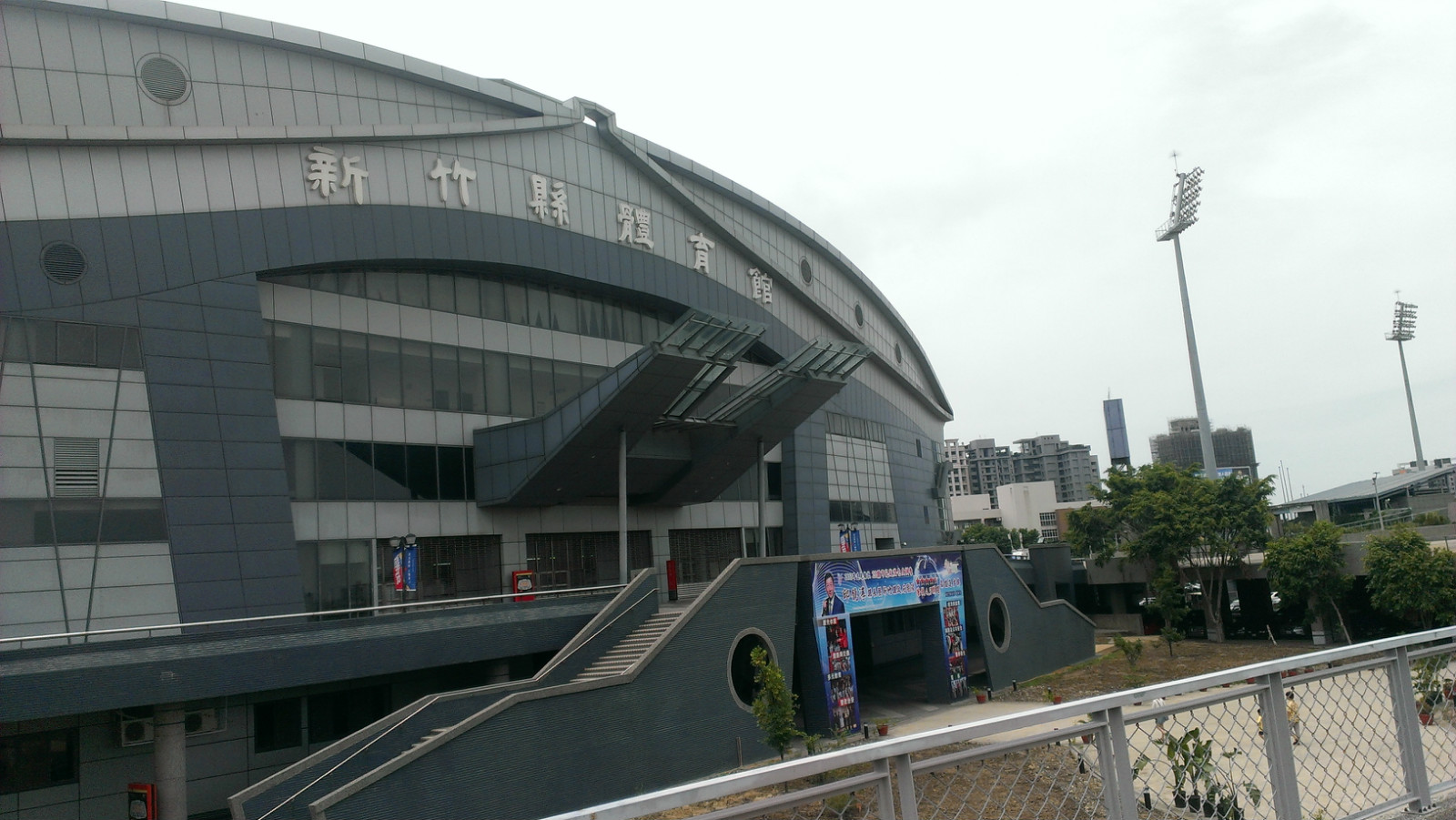
- Interactive map of Hsinchu County Stadium 新竹縣體育館
- Address: No.2, Dong Sec. 1, Guangming 6th Road, Zhubei, Hsinchu County 302, Taiwan
- Coordinates: 24°49′9.78″N 121°01′12.98″E
- Owner: Hsinchu County Government
- Capacity: Outdoor: 15,000; Indoor: 8,000

Construction
- Built: 2003
- Opened: 2005
- Cost: NT$190 million

Tenants
- Hsinchu JKO Lioneers/Hsinchu Toplus Lioneers (PLG/TPBL) (2020-present); Taipei Taishin Mars (TPBL) (2025)

Hsinchu County Stadium
- Traditional Chinese: 新竹縣體育館
Transcriptions
Standard Mandarin
- Hanyu Pinyin: Xīnzhúxiàn tǐyùguǎn

The Hsinchu County Stadium (Chinese: 新竹縣體育館; pinyin: Xīnzhúxiàn Tǐyùguǎn), also referred to as Zhubei Dome (Chinese: 竹北巨蛋), is a multi-purpose stadium in Zhubei City, Hsinchu County, Taiwan. Completed in 2005, the stadium consists of an outdoor arena used mostly for football and track and field events and outdoor concerts, and an indoor stadium for multiple sports events, exhibitions, conferences and performances. In 2006, it received the EEWH green building certification.

South Korean SM Town artists held 2 concerts at the outdoor arena, as part of the SM Town Live World Tour III and SM Town Live World Tour 4 on 9 June 2012 and 21 March 2015 respectively.

== Features ==
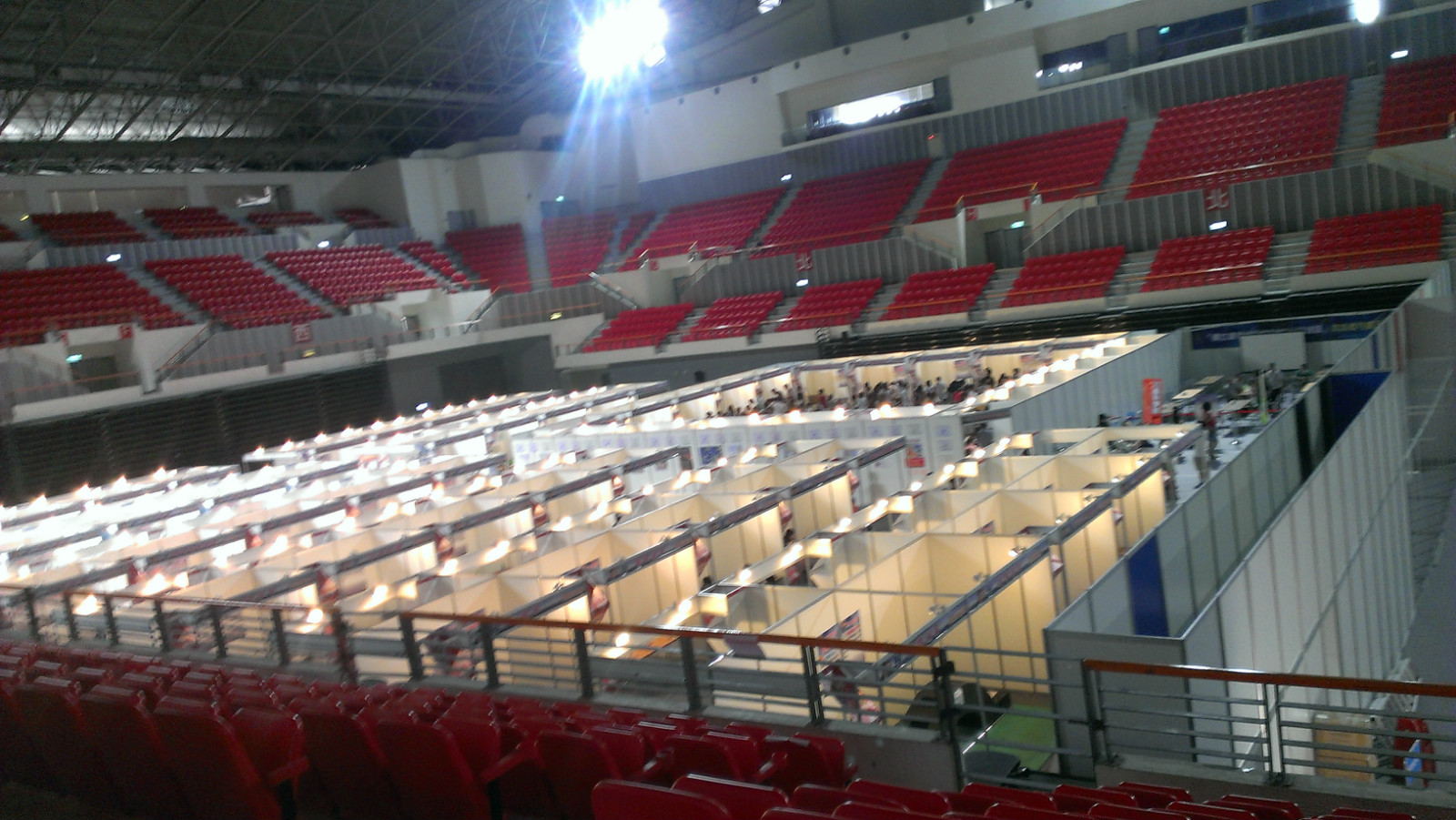
An event held in the indoor stadium

- Outdoor arena: IAAF certified track
- Indoor stadium: Three-floored structure with flexible configuration (seats between 6,000 and 8,000)

== See also ==
- List of stadiums in Taiwan
