= New Taipei Kings all-time roster =

The following is a list of players, both past and current, who appeared at least in one game for the New Taipei Kings (2021–present) franchise.

== Players ==
Note: Statistics are correct through the end of the 2025–26 TPBL season.

G	Guard	PG	Point guard	SG	Shooting guard	G/F	Guard-forward	F	Forward	SF	Small forward	PF	Power forward	F/C	Forward-center	C	Center

^{x}	Denotes player who is currently on the New Taipei Kings roster
0.0	Denotes the New Taipei Kings statistics leader (min. 40 games played for the team for per-game statistics)
player	Denotes player who has played for the New Taipei Kings in the PLG
player	Denotes player who has played for the New Taipei Kings in the EASL
player	Denotes player who has played for the New Taipei Kings in the BCL Asia
(#)	Denotes that the player's number is retired by the New Taipei Kings

=== A ===
Player	Name	Nat.	Pos.	From	Yrs	Seasons	Statistics									Ref.
Player	Name	Nat.	Pos.	From	Yrs	Seasons	GP	MP	PTS	REB	AST	MPG	PPG	RPG	APG	Ref.
Christian Anigwe	安尼奎	(United States)	F	UC Davis	1	2023–2024	31	876:31	306	261	22	28:16	9.9	8.4	0.7	

=== B ===
Player	Name	Nat.	Pos.	From	Yrs	Seasons	Statistics									Ref.
Player	Name	Nat.	Pos.	From	Yrs	Seasons	GP	MP	PTS	REB	AST	MPG	PPG	RPG	APG	Ref.
Hayden Blankley	海登	(Australia)	F	West Texas A&M	1	2023–2024	11	259:33	126	55	18	23:35	11.5	5.0	1.6	
Chaundee Brown	尚迪	(United States)	G	Michigan	1	2025–2026	7	191:53	78	49	9	27:24	11.1	7.0	1.3	

=== C ===
Player	Name	Nat.	Pos.	From	Yrs	Seasons	Statistics									Ref.
Player	Name	Nat.	Pos.	From	Yrs	Seasons	GP	MP	PTS	REB	AST	MPG	PPG	RPG	APG	Ref.
Chai Chen-Hao	翟振皓	(Taiwan)	F	UKN	1	2023–2024	5	11:53	4	8	0	2:23	0.8	1.6	0.0	
Chen Chun-Nan	陳俊男	(Taiwan)	F	NTSU	4	2021–2025	124	1623:21	360	193	106	13:05	2.9	1.6	0.9	
Chien You-Che^{x}	簡祐哲	(Taiwan)	G	UCH	6	2021–present	181	2935:45	842	293	120	16:13	4.7	1.6	0.7	
Chou Yi-Hsiang^{x}	周儀翔	(Taiwan)	SG/SF	Salt Lake CC	1	2026–present	0	0:00	0	0	0	0:00	0.0	0.0	0.0	
Chuang Chao-Sheng^{x}	莊朝勝	(Taiwan)	G	NCCU	1	2026–present	0	0:00	0	0	0	0:00	0.0	0.0	0.0	
Chung Li-Hsiang	鍾理翔	(Taiwan)	SF	NCCU	1	2025–2026	13	71:44	6	6	2	5:31	0.5	0.5	0.2	

=== D ===
Player	Name	Nat.	Pos.	From	Yrs	Seasons	Statistics									Ref.
Player	Name	Nat.	Pos.	From	Yrs	Seasons	GP	MP	PTS	REB	AST	MPG	PPG	RPG	APG	Ref.
Quincy Davis (Note: Quincy Davis didn't play for TPBL.)	戴維斯	(Taiwan)	C	Tulane	4	2021–2024; 2025–2026	71	1591:56	687	550	92	22:25	9.7	7.7	1.3	
Austin Daye	奧帝	(United States)	PF	Gonzaga	4	2022–2026	61	1612:20	878	434	153	26:25	14.4	7.1	2.5	

=== E ===
Player	Name	Nat.	Pos.	From	Yrs	Seasons	Statistics									Ref.
Player	Name	Nat.	Pos.	From	Yrs	Seasons	GP	MP	PTS	REB	AST	MPG	PPG	RPG	APG	Ref.
Michael Efevberha (Note: Michael Efevberha didn't play for TPBL.)	艾夫伯	(Nigeria) (United States)	G	Cal State Northridge	1	2024–2025	6	177:48	152	36	17	29:38	25.3	6.0	2.8	

=== G ===
Player	Name	Nat.	Pos.	From	Yrs	Seasons	Statistics									Ref.
Player	Name	Nat.	Pos.	From	Yrs	Seasons	GP	MP	PTS	REB	AST	MPG	PPG	RPG	APG	Ref.
Jayden Gardner	傑登	(United States)	F	Virginia	1	2025–2026	28	916:03	535	244	60	32:42	19.1	8.7	2.1	
Tanner Groves^{x}	坦克夫	(United States)	PF/C	Oklahoma	1	2026–present	0	0:00	0	0	0	0:00	0.0	0.0	0.0	
Steven Guinchard	張文平	(France) (Taiwan)	F	Emmanuel	1	2021–2022	25	358:39	109	59	18	14:21	4.4	2.4	0.7	

=== H ===
Player	Name	Nat.	Pos.	From	Yrs	Seasons	Statistics									Ref.
Player	Name	Nat.	Pos.	From	Yrs	Seasons	GP	MP	PTS	REB	AST	MPG	PPG	RPG	APG	Ref.
Jalen Harris	杰倫	(United States) (Jordan)	G	Nevada	1	2025–2026	19	665:30	504	106	100	35:01	26.5	5.6	5.3	
Hsiao Shun-Yi^{x}	蕭順議	(Taiwan)	F	NTUA	1	2026–present	0	0:00	0	0	0	0:00	0.0	0.0	0.0	
Ryder Hsiung^{x}	熊祥泰	(United States) (Taiwan)	F	Willamette	2	2025–present	40	644:01	196	61	10	16:06	4.9	1.5	0.3	
Hung Chih-Shan	洪志善	(Taiwan)	G	NTUT	5	2021–2026	110	1511:35	357	136	229	13:44	3.2	1.2	2.1	
Hung Kai-Chieh	洪楷傑	(Taiwan)	G	NCCU	1	2021–2022	27	618:49	191	53	46	22:55	7.1	2.0	1.7	

=== J ===
Player	Name	Nat.	Pos.	From	Yrs	Seasons	Statistics									Ref.
Player	Name	Nat.	Pos.	From	Yrs	Seasons	GP	MP	PTS	REB	AST	MPG	PPG	RPG	APG	Ref.
Chris Johnson	強森	(United States)	C	LSU	1	2024–2025	19	517:20	286	179	41	27:13	15.1	9.4	2.2	

=== K ===
Player	Name	Nat.	Pos.	From	Yrs	Seasons	Statistics									Ref.
Player	Name	Nat.	Pos.	From	Yrs	Seasons	GP	MP	PTS	REB	AST	MPG	PPG	RPG	APG	Ref.
Kao Cheng-En	高承恩	(Taiwan)	G	UCH	1	2022–2023	3	6:53	7	1	0	2:18	2.3	0.3	0.0	

=== L ===
Player	Name	Nat.	Pos.	From	Yrs	Seasons	Statistics									Ref.
Player	Name	Nat.	Pos.	From	Yrs	Seasons	GP	MP	PTS	REB	AST	MPG	PPG	RPG	APG	Ref.
Lee Kai-Yan^{x}	李愷諺	(Taiwan)	G	HWU	6	2021–present	160	4512:56	1569	583	554	28:12	9.8	3.6	3.5	
Lee Ying-Feng; Li Ruei-Ci	李盈鋒 李睿麒	(Taiwan)	F	TSU	2	2021–2023	27	308:31	95	54	13	11:26	3.5	2.0	0.5	
Kendall Lewis^{x}	肯刀爾	(United States)	F	Illinois State	1	2026–present	0	0:00	0	0	0	0:00	0.0	0.0	0.0	
Wendell Lewis	路易士	(United States)	F	Alabama State	1	2023–2024	11	320:19	135	97	9	29:07	12.3	8.8	0.8	
Li Wei-Ting	李威廷	(Taiwan)	G	SHU	2	2022–2024	26	220:53	99	21	14	8:30	3.8	0.8	0.5	
DeAndre Liggins	里金斯	(United States)	F	Kentucky	1	2021–2022	16	589:34	262	133	81	36:51	16.4	8.3	5.1	
Lin Chin-Pang	林金榜	(Taiwan)	SF	MU	4	2022–2026	116	1191:16	237	161	72	10:16	2.0	1.4	0.6	
Jeremy Lin (#7)	林書豪	(United States) (Taiwan)	G	Harvard	2	2023–2025	64	1977:49	1221	348	324	30:54	19.1	5.4	5.1	
Joseph Lin^{x}	林書緯	(United States) (Taiwan)	G	Hamilton	5	2022–present	152	5013:22	1822	547	881	32:58	12.0	3.6	5.8	
Lin Li-Jen	林力仁	(Taiwan)	G	MDU	4	2021–2025	79	621:30	195	74	18	7:52	2.5	0.9	0.2	
Lin Shih-Hsuan	林仕軒	(Taiwan)	G	NTNU	2	2021–2023	28	307:35	66	37	41	10:59	2.4	1.3	1.5	
Lin Yan-Ting^{x}	林彥廷	(Taiwan)	G	NCCU	2	2025–present	46	1203:50	380	130	153	26:10	8.3	2.8	3.3	
Lu Cheng-Ju	呂政儒	(Taiwan)	SF	TPEC	2	2024–2026	67	834:45	246	73	35	12:27	3.7	1.1	0.5	

=== M ===
Player	Name	Nat.	Pos.	From	Yrs	Seasons	Statistics									Ref.
Player	Name	Nat.	Pos.	From	Yrs	Seasons	GP	MP	PTS	REB	AST	MPG	PPG	RPG	APG	Ref.
Kenny Manigault	曼尼高	(United States)	F	Pikeville	3	2022–2025	104	3496:08	1776	989	567	33:37	17.1	9.5	5.5	
Chris McCullough	麥卡洛	(United States)	F	Syracuse	1	2021–2022	7	226:13	146	60	12	32:19	20.9	8.6	1.7	
Tony Mitchell	米歇爾	(United States) (Mexico)	F	North Texas	1	2023–2024	20	500:43	242	170	25	25:02	12.1	8.5	1.3	
Byron Mullens	牧倫斯	(United States) (United Kingdom)	C	Ohio State	3	2021–2024	46	1478:31	942	655	107	32:08	20.5	14.2	2.3	

=== N ===
Player	Name	Nat.	Pos.	From	Yrs	Seasons	Statistics									Ref.
Player	Name	Nat.	Pos.	From	Yrs	Seasons	GP	MP	PTS	REB	AST	MPG	PPG	RPG	APG	Ref.
Omar Niang	聶歐瑪	(Senegal)	C	NCCU	2	2021–2023	36	383:10	44	104	10	10:39	1.2	2.9	0.3	

=== O ===
Player	Name	Nat.	Pos.	From	Yrs	Seasons	Statistics									Ref.
Player	Name	Nat.	Pos.	From	Yrs	Seasons	GP	MP	PTS	REB	AST	MPG	PPG	RPG	APG	Ref.
Olufemi Olujobi	飛米	(United States)	F	DePaul	1	2025–2026	15	462:30	279	120	30	30:50	18.6	8.0	2.0	

=== P ===
Player	Name	Nat.	Pos.	From	Yrs	Seasons	Statistics									Ref.
Player	Name	Nat.	Pos.	From	Yrs	Seasons	GP	MP	PTS	REB	AST	MPG	PPG	RPG	APG	Ref.
Pan Wei-Jie^{x}	潘偉傑	(Taiwan)	G	UCH	1	2026–present	0	0:00	0	0	0	0:00	0.0	0.0	0.0	

=== S ===
Player	Name	Nat.	Pos.	From	Yrs	Seasons	Statistics									Ref.
Player	Name	Nat.	Pos.	From	Yrs	Seasons	GP	MP	PTS	REB	AST	MPG	PPG	RPG	APG	Ref.
Sani Sakakini	桑尼	(Palestine)	PF	JUST	2	2024–2026	33	1005:39	650	294	68	30:28	19.7	8.9	2.1	
Jonathan Smith^{x}	喬納森	(Taiwan)	F	NTUA	2	2025–present	23	146:48	34	13	7	6:22	1.5	0.6	0.3	
Su Pei-Kai	蘇培凱	(Taiwan)	G	NTUA	3	2023–2026	57	389:34	113	38	41	6:50	2.0	0.7	0.7	
Su Shih-Hsuan^{x}	蘇士軒	(Taiwan)	F	NTNU	5	2022–present	157	2618:30	704	522	136	16:40	4.5	3.3	0.9	
Craig Sword^{x}	克雷格	(United States)	G	Mississippi State	1	2026–present	0	0:00	0	0	0	0:00	0.0	0.0	0.0	

=== T ===
Player	Name	Nat.	Pos.	From	Yrs	Seasons	Statistics									Ref.
Player	Name	Nat.	Pos.	From	Yrs	Seasons	GP	MP	PTS	REB	AST	MPG	PPG	RPG	APG	Ref.
Jordan Tolbert	喬丹	(United States)	F	SMU	1	2025–2026	11	379:45	152	113	32	34:31	13.8	10.3	2.9	
Tseng Yu-Hao	曾于豪	(Taiwan)	F	NCCU	2	2021–2023	9	87:57	24	17	5	9:46	2.7	1.9	0.6	

=== W ===
Player	Name	Nat.	Pos.	From	Yrs	Seasons	Statistics									Ref.
Player	Name	Nat.	Pos.	From	Yrs	Seasons	GP	MP	PTS	REB	AST	MPG	PPG	RPG	APG	Ref.
Wang Po-Chih^{x}	王柏智	(Taiwan)	C	NTSU	4	2023–present	100	806:11	266	164	24	8:03	2.7	1.6	0.2	
Jason Washburn^{x}	沃許本	(United States) (Bulgaria)	C	Utah	3	2024–present	63	2060:23	1212	658	92	32:42	19.2	10.4	1.5	
Thomas Welsh^{x}	湯瑪士	(United States)	C	UCLA	2	2021–2022; 2026–present	20	743:32	353	358	38	37:10	17.7	17.9	1.9	

=== Y ===
Player	Name	Nat.	Pos.	From	Yrs	Seasons	Statistics									Ref.
Player	Name	Nat.	Pos.	From	Yrs	Seasons	GP	MP	PTS	REB	AST	MPG	PPG	RPG	APG	Ref.
Yang Chin-Min	楊敬敏	(Taiwan)	F	FJU	3	2021–2024	96	2867:55	1540	397	268	29:52	16.0	4.1	2.8	
Yang Hsing-Chih	楊興治	(Taiwan)	F	NTNU	2	2021–2023	47	561:28	118	73	18	11:57	2.5	1.6	0.4	
