= List of New Taipei Kings head coaches =

The New Taipei Kings are a Taiwanese professional basketball team based in New Taipei City, Taiwan. The team is owned by Kings Blessed Investment and coached by Hung Chih-Shan, with James Mao as the general manager. The Kings won 1 P. League+ championship and 1 Taiwan Professional Basketball League championship since the team was founded in 2021.

There have been 4 head coaches for the New Taipei Kings franchise. They won their first P. League+ championship in the 2024 PLG finals coached by Ryan Marchand, and won their first Taiwan Professional Basketball League championship in the 2025 TPBL finals coached by Ryan Marchand.

== Key ==
GC	Games coached
W	Wins
L	Losses
Win%	Winning percentage
#	Number of coaches

== Coaches ==
Note: Statistics are correct through the end of the 2025–26 TPBL season.

#	Name	Term	GC	W	L	Win%	GC	W	L	Win%	Achievements
#	Name	Term	Regular season				Playoffs				Achievements
New Taipei Kings
1	Ryan Marchand	2021–2025	146	91	55	.623	37	23	14	.622	2022–23 PLG Coach of the Year; 2024–25 TPBL Coach of the Year; 1 PLG championship (2024); 1 TPBL championship (2025)
2	John Patrick	2025	7	3	4	.429	–	–	–	–	
3	Thomas Wisman	2025	1	1	0	1.000	–	–	–	–	
4	Hung Chih-Shan	2025–present	28	15	13	.536	13	8	5	.615	
