= 2025–26 New Taipei Kings season =

Taiwanese professional basketball season

- President: Walter Wang
- General Manager: James Mao
- Head Coach: John Patrick (contract terminated); Thomas Wisman (interim); Hung Chih-Shan (interim)
- Arena: Xinzhuang Gymnasium; University of Taipei, Tian-Mu Campus Gymnasium; Taipei Heping Basketball Gymnasium

TPBL results
- Record: 19–17 (52.8%)
- Place: 5th
- Playoffs finish: Finals (lost to Dreamers, 3–4)

EASL results
- Record: 3–3 (50.0%)
- Place: 2nd
- Playoffs finish: Quarterfinals (lost to Brex, 64–85)

BCL Asia

BCL Asia – East results
- Record: 2–4 (33.3%)
- Place: 4th
- Playoffs finish: Did not qualify

Player records
- Points: Jason Washburn 18.5
- Rebounds: Jason Washburn 10.7
- Assists: Joseph Lin 7.0

The 2025–26 New Taipei Kings season was the franchise's fifth season, its second season in the Taiwan Professional Basketball League (TPBL).

On July 5, 2025, the Kings announced that Ryan Marchand left the team for career decision. On July 9, the Kings hired John Patrick as their new head coach. On November 11, the Kings announced to terminate contract relationship with John Patrick. And the Kings named Hung Chih-Shan as their interim head coach after Thomas Wisman, the assistant coach of the New Taipei Kings, coached as interim head coach for one game.

The Kings also participated in 2025–26 East Asia Super League and 2026 Basketball Champions League Asia – East as the 2025 TPBL champion.

== Draft ==
Round	Pick	Player	Position(s)	School / club team
1	6	Jonathan Smith	Guard / forward	NTUA
2	8	Ryder Hsiung	Forward	Willamette

- Reference：

== Roster ==
2025–26 New Taipei Kings roster
Players
Coaches

Pos.	No.	Nat.	Name	Ht.	Wt.	Age	From
G	0	(United States) (Jordan)	Jalen Harris (I)	1.93 m (6 ft 4 in)	88 kg (194 lb)	27 – 14 August 1998	Nevada
G	1	(United States) (Taiwan)	Joseph Lin	1.82 m (6 ft 0 in)	69 kg (152 lb)	33 – 21 June 1992	Hamilton
G	2	(Taiwan)	Su Pei-Kai	1.87 m (6 ft 2 in)	83 kg (183 lb)	26 – 2 November 1999	NTUA
G	3	(Iran)	Sina Vahedi (AI)	1.85 m (6 ft 1 in)	84 kg (185 lb)	25 – 8 January 2001	Iran
F	5	(United States)	Jayden Gardner (BCL)	2.01 m (6 ft 7 in)	104 kg (229 lb)	26 – 14 May 2000	Virginia
SF	8	(Taiwan)	Chung Li-Hsiang	1.94 m (6 ft 4 in)	92 kg (203 lb)	23 – 16 March 2003	NCCU
G	9	(Taiwan)	Lee Kai-Yan	1.82 m (6 ft 0 in)	80 kg (176 lb)	33 – 6 May 1993	HWU
G	10	(Taiwan)	Chien You-Che	1.80 m (5 ft 11 in)	80 kg (176 lb)	30 – 10 September 1995	UCH
C	11	(Taiwan)	Wang Po-Chih	1.97 m (6 ft 6 in)	130 kg (287 lb)	29 – 29 October 1996	NTSU
G	12	(Taiwan)	Lin Yan-Ting	1.85 m (6 ft 1 in)	85 kg (187 lb)	25 – 22 October 2000	NCCU
SF	13	(Taiwan)	Lu Cheng-Ju	1.94 m (6 ft 4 in)	88 kg (194 lb)	40 – 13 April 1986	TPEC
F	15	(Jamaica) (United States)	Olufemi Olujobi (I)	2.06 m (6 ft 9 in)	112 kg (247 lb)	30 – 5 March 1996	DePaul
PF	17	(Taiwan)	Su Shih-Hsuan	1.97 m (6 ft 6 in)	95 kg (209 lb)	30 – 9 April 1996	NTNU
SF	19	(Taiwan)	Lin Chin-Pang (C)	1.90 m (6 ft 3 in)	92 kg (203 lb)	40 – 15 June 1985	MU
SF	20	(United States) (Taiwan)	Ryder Hsiung	1.92 m (6 ft 4 in)	76 kg (168 lb)	23 – 14 April 2003	Willamette
PF	25	(United States)	Austin Daye (I)	2.07 m (6 ft 9 in)	91 kg (201 lb)	38 – 5 June 1988	Gonzaga
SF	26	(Taiwan)	Jonathan Smith	1.87 m (6 ft 2 in)	87 kg (192 lb)	23 – 9 May 2003	NTUA
F	33	(United States)	Jordan Tolbert (BCL)	2.01 m (6 ft 7 in)	104 kg (229 lb)	33 – 8 November 1992	SMU
C	42	(United States) (Bulgaria)	Jason Washburn (I)	2.13 m (7 ft 0 in)	111 kg (245 lb)	36 – 5 June 1990	Utah
C	50	(Taiwan)	Quincy Davis (BCL)	2.03 m (6 ft 8 in)	100 kg (220 lb)	43 – 16 February 1983	Tulane

Head coach

- (Taiwan) Hung Chih-Shan (interim)

Assistant coach(es)

- (Australia) (United States) Thomas Wisman
- (Taiwan) Lin Cheng-Yu
- (Taiwan) Wei Wei
- (Taiwan) Lee Wei-En

Strength & conditioning coach(es)

- (Taiwan) Chang Chung-Hsi
- (Taiwan) Chao Te

Athletic trainer(s)

- (Taiwan) Chiu Po-Kai
- (Taiwan) Wu Chung-Hao

Team manager

- (Taiwan) James Mao

Legend

- (C) Team captain
- (I) Import player
- (AI) Asian import player
- (BCL) BCL Asia player
- Injured

- Roster
Updated: May 10, 2026

== Preseason ==
=== Game log ===
2025 preseason game log
Total: 1–1 (home: 0–1; road: 1–0)
Preseason : 1–1 (home: 0–1; road: 1–0)

Game	Date	Team	Score	High points	High rebounds	High assists	Location Attendance	Record
1	October 4	Mars	L 100–105	Chaundee Brown (19)	Sani Sakakini (16)	Lee Kai-Yan (6)	Pingtung County Stadium	0–1
2	October 5	@ Leopards	W 99–89	Chaundee Brown (22)	Jayden Gardner (12)	Joseph Lin (5); Sani Sakakini (5); Su Pei-Kai (5)	Pingtung County Stadium	1–1

Color： Win Lose
Schedule

== Regular season ==
=== Standings ===
Pos	Team	Pld	W	L	PCT	GB	Qualification
1	Taoyuan Taiwan Beer Leopards	36	23	13	.639	—	Advance to semifinals
2	Formosa Dreamers	36	22	14	.611	1	Advance to semifinals
3	Hsinchu Toplus Lioneers	36	22	14	.611	1	Advance to semifinals
4	New Taipei CTBC DEA	36	20	16	.556	3	Advance to play-in
5	New Taipei Kings	36	19	17	.528	4	Advance to play-in
6	Taipei Taishin Mars	36	11	25	.306	12	
7	Kaohsiung Aquas	36	9	27	.250	14	

Source: TPBL

=== Game log ===
2025–26 regular season game log
Total: 19–17 (home: 12–6; road: 7–11)
October : 2–3 (home: 2–2; road: 0–1)

Game	Date	Team	Score	High points	High rebounds	High assists	Location Attendance	Record
1	October 11	Aquas	W 110–100	Jayden Gardner (22)	Jayden Gardner (15)	Lee Kai-Yan (5)	Xinzhuang Gymnasium; 4,568	1–0
2	October 12	Dreamers	W 112–93	Jayden Gardner (25)	Jayden Gardner (8)	Joseph Lin (9)	Xinzhuang Gymnasium; 4,047	2–0
3	October 18	DEA	L 89–105	Jason Washburn (18)	Jason Washburn (12)	Lin Yan-Ting (5)	Xinzhuang Gymnasium; 4,385	2–1
4	October 19	Mars	L 120–123 (OT)	Jayden Gardner (23)	Sani Sakakini (14)	Joseph Lin (11)	Xinzhuang Gymnasium; 3,650	2–2
5	October 25	@ Aquas	L 79–91	Austin Daye (20)	Austin Daye (9)	Lee Kai-Yan (4); Lin Yan-Ting (4)	Kaohsiung Arena; 7,138	2–3

November : 2–3 (home: 2–1; road: 0–2)

Game	Date	Team	Score	High points	High rebounds	High assists	Location Attendance	Record
6	November 8	Lioneers	L 89–108	Jayden Gardner (27)	Jayden Gardner (15)	Lee Kai-Yan (5)	Xinzhuang Gymnasium; 3,678	2–4
7	November 9	Aquas	W 111–94	Sani Sakakini (36)	Jayden Gardner (12); Chaundee Brown (12)	Lee Kai-Yan (10)	Xinzhuang Gymnasium; 4,085	3–4
8	November 12	Dreamers	W 94–91	Sani Sakakini (26)	Jayden Gardner (12)	Joseph Lin (8)	Xinzhuang Gymnasium; 3,334	4–4
9	November 15	@ Mars	L 87–97	Austin Daye (17)	Jason Washburn (11)	Lin Yan-Ting (11)	Taipei Heping Basketball Gymnasium; 5,500	4–5
10	November 22	@ Leopards	L 101–103	Sani Sakakini (25)	Sani Sakakini (10)	Lee Kai-Yan (14)	Taoyuan Arena; 5,917	4–6

December : 3–3 (home: 3–1; road: 0–2)

Game	Date	Team	Score	High points	High rebounds	High assists	Location Attendance	Record
11	December 14	@ DEA	L 111–114	Jalen Harris (31)	Jason Washburn (8)	Joseph Lin (7)	Xinzhuang Gymnasium; 5,063	4–7
12	December 20	Leopards	W 125–103	Jalen Harris (27)	Jason Washburn (12)	Joseph Lin (6); Jalen Harris (6)	Xinzhuang Gymnasium; 4,362	5–7
13	December 21	DEA	W 85–78	Lu Cheng-Ju (18); Jason Washburn (18)	Jayden Gardner (14)	Lee Kai-Yan (6)	Xinzhuang Gymnasium; 4,377	6–7
14	December 27	Lioneers	L 90–97	Jason Washburn (30)	Jason Washburn (18)	Joseph Lin (6)	Xinzhuang Gymnasium; 3,868	6–8
15	December 28	Aquas	W 86–82	Jalen Harris (23)	Jason Washburn (13)	Joseph Lin (6)	Xinzhuang Gymnasium; 6,500	7–8
16	December 31	@ DEA	L 82–94	Jayden Gardner (16)	Jayden Gardner (14)	Joseph Lin (8)	Xinzhuang Gymnasium; 4,143	7–9

January : 3–2 (home: 0–0; road: 3–2)

Game	Date	Team	Score	High points	High rebounds	High assists	Location Attendance	Record
17	January 4	@ Aquas	W 111–94	Jalen Harris (35)	Jason Washburn (11)	Jalen Harris (7)	Kaohsiung Arena; 4,761	8–9
18	January 9	@ Leopards	L 87–110	Jalen Harris (21)	Jason Washburn (13)	Joseph Lin (6)	Taoyuan City Zhongli Civil Sports Center; 2,000	8–10
19	January 17	@ Dreamers	L 96–116	Jalen Harris (20)	Austin Daye (8)	Joseph Lin (7)	Taichung Intercontinental Basketball Stadium; 3,000	8–11
20	January 25	@ Lioneers	W 94–87	Jayden Gardner (22)	Olufemi Olujobi (14)	Joseph Lin (7)	Hsinchu County Stadium; 5,559	9–11
21	January 31	@ Dreamers	W 114–97	Joseph Lin (36)	Jordan Tolbert (15)	Joseph Lin (8)	Taichung Intercontinental Basketball Stadium; 2,778	10–11

February : 3–0 (home: 2–0; road: 1–0)

Game	Date	Team	Score	High points	High rebounds	High assists	Location Attendance	Record
22	February 7	@ Mars	W 98–96	Olufemi Olujobi (25)	Olufemi Olujobi (9); Austin Daye (9)	Lin Yan-Ting (7); Austin Daye (7)	Taipei Heping Basketball Gymnasium; 5,176	11–11
23	February 14	Mars	W 116–95	Olufemi Olujobi (21)	Jordan Tolbert (13)	Joseph Lin (5); Jordan Tolbert (5); Lin Yan-Ting (5)	Xinzhuang Gymnasium; 3,833	12–11
24	February 15	Lioneers	W 100–85	Jason Washburn (26)	Jason Washburn (13)	Joseph Lin (15)	Xinzhuang Gymnasium; 4,059	13–11

March : 3–3 (home: 1–1; road: 2–2)

Game	Date	Team	Score	High points	High rebounds	High assists	Location Attendance	Record
25	March 4	Leopards	L 100–116	Lin Yan-Ting (20)	Jordan Tolbert (16)	Joseph Lin (14)	Xinzhuang Gymnasium; 3,367	13–12
26	March 6	Mars	W 93–90	Jason Washburn (22)	Olufemi Olujobi (11)	Joseph Lin (10)	Xinzhuang Gymnasium; 3,716	14–12
27	March 8	@ Leopards	W 114–101	Jalen Harris (42)	Olufemi Olujobi (11)	Joseph Lin (12)	Taoyuan City Zhongli Civil Sports Center; 2,000	15–12
28	March 15	@ Lioneers	L 90–113	Jason Washburn (26)	Jason Washburn (11)	Lin Yan-Ting (8)	Hsinchu County Stadium; 4,807	15–13
29	March 27	@ Dreamers	L 90–107	Jalen Harris (21)	Jason Washburn (12)	Jalen Harris (7)	Taichung Intercontinental Basketball Stadium; 3,000	15–14
30	March 29	@ Mars	W 116–102	Joseph Lin (23); Jalen Harris (23)	Jason Washburn (9)	Joseph Lin (6)	Taipei Heping Basketball Gymnasium; 4,395	16–14

April : 2–2 (home: 1–0; road: 1–2)

Game	Date	Team	Score	High points	High rebounds	High assists	Location Attendance	Record
31	April 5	@ DEA	L 78–98	Jalen Harris (25)	Jason Washburn (12)	Joseph Lin (4); Jalen Harris (4)	Xinzhuang Gymnasium; 4,983	16–15
32	April 11	@ Aquas	W 112–111	Jalen Harris (32)	Jason Washburn (11)	Jalen Harris (6)	Kaohsiung Arena; 5,299	17–15
33	April 24	Dreamers	W 105–99	Jason Washburn (26)	Jason Washburn (12)	Joseph Lin (9)	Xinzhuang Gymnasium; 3,723	18–15
34	April 29	@ Lioneers	L 78–98	Lin Yan-Ting (15)	Olufemi Olujobi (10)	Joseph Lin (11)	Hsinchu County Stadium; 3,761	18–16

May : 1–1 (home: 1–1; road: 0–0)

Game	Date	Team	Score	High points	High rebounds	High assists	Location Attendance	Record
35	May 2	Leopards	W 97–94	Jalen Harris (33)	Jason Washburn (18)	Jalen Harris (10)	Xinzhuang Gymnasium; 5,185	19–16
36	May 3	DEA	L 87–111	Olufemi Olujobi (27)	Jason Washburn (13)	Joseph Lin (6)	Xinzhuang Gymnasium; 5,513	19–17

Color： Win Lose
Schedule

== Playoffs ==
=== Game log ===
2026 playoffs game log
Total: 8–5 (home: 5–1; road: 3–4)
Play-in : 2–0 (home: 1–0; road: 1–0)

Game	Date	Team	Score	High points	High rebounds	High assists	Location Attendance	Series
1	May 5	DEA	W 102–86	Joseph Lin (23); Jalen Harris (23)	Jalen Harris (13)	Joseph Lin (9)	Xinzhuang Gymnasium; 2,323	1–1
2	May 6	@ DEA	W 96–90	Jalen Harris (22)	Austin Daye (11)	Joseph Lin (7)	Taipei Heping Basketball Gymnasium; 2,479	2–1

Semifinals : 3–1 (home: 2–0; road: 1–1)

Game	Date	Team	Score	High points	High rebounds	High assists	Location Attendance	Series
1	May 10	@ Leopards	W 113–105	Joseph Lin (26)	Austin Daye (8)	Joseph Lin (7); Jalen Harris (7)	Taoyuan Arena; 5,508	1–0
2	May 13	@ Leopards	L 92–114	Joseph Lin (21)	Jason Washburn (12)	Joseph Lin (5)	Taoyuan Arena; 3,520	1–1
3	May 15	Leopards	W 104–102	Jalen Harris (31)	Jason Washburn (14)	Joseph Lin (8)	Taipei Heping Basketball Gymnasium; 5,591	2–1
4	May 17	Leopards	W 116–114	Jalen Harris (30)	Jalen Harris (11)	Jalen Harris (7)	Taipei Heping Basketball Gymnasium; 5,838	3–1

Finals : 3–4 (home: 2–1; road: 1–3)

Game	Date	Team	Score	High points	High rebounds	High assists	Location Attendance	Series
1	May 24	@ Dreamers	W 91–90	Jalen Harris (41)	Jason Washburn (14)	Joseph Lin (5)	Taichung Intercontinental Basketball Stadium; 3,000	1–0
2	May 26	@ Dreamers	L 90–99	Jason Washburn (16)	Jason Washburn (9); Austin Daye (9)	Jalen Harris (7)	Taichung Intercontinental Basketball Stadium; 3,000	1–1
3	May 29	Dreamers	W 109–84	Jalen Harris (25)	Jason Washburn (8); Austin Daye (8)	Joseph Lin (7)	Xinzhuang Gymnasium; 6,187	2–1
4	May 31	Dreamers	W 96–93	Jalen Harris (19); Austin Daye (19)	Jason Washburn (13)	Joseph Lin (7)	Xinzhuang Gymnasium; 6,800	3–1
5	June 2	@ Dreamers	L 69–105	Jason Washburn (24)	Olufemi Olujobi (7)	Joseph Lin (4)	Taichung Intercontinental Basketball Stadium; 3,000	3–2
6	June 4	Dreamers	L 88–91	Jalen Harris (28)	Jalen Harris (6)	Joseph Lin (5)	Xinzhuang Gymnasium; 6,648	3–3
7	June 6	@ Dreamers	L 78–90	Austin Daye (16)	Jalen Harris (9)	Joseph Lin (6)	Taichung Intercontinental Basketball Stadium; 3,000	3–4

Color： Win Lose
Schedule

=== Play-in note ===
- The fourth seed, New Taipei CTBC DEA, was awarded a one-win advantage before play-in series.

== East Asia Super League ==
=== Standings ===
Pos	Team	Pld	W	L	PF	PA	PD	PCT	Qualification
1	(Japan) Alvark Tokyo	6	5	1	545	499	+46	.833	Advance to finals
2	(Chinese Taipei) New Taipei Kings	6	3	3	536	548	−12	.500 (Note: New Taipei Kings 185–184 Ulaanbaatar Xac Broncos)	Advance to finals
3	(Mongolia) Ulaanbaatar Xac Broncos	6	3	3	549	526	+23	.500	
4	(South Korea) Changwon LG Sakers	6	1	5	494	551	−57	.167	

Source: EASL

=== Group stage ===
October 22, 2025	New Taipei Kings (Chinese Taipei)	89–107	(Japan) Alvark Tokyo	New Taipei City
19:10 (UTC+8)	Scoring by quarter: 23–30, 17–25, 26–31, 23–21
	Pts: Jayden Gardner 29; Rebs: Jayden Gardner 7 Asts: Lin Yan-Ting 5	Boxscore	Pts: Sebas Saiz 25; Rebs: Ryan Rossiter 11; Asts: Kai Toews, Ryan Rossiter 6	Arena: Xinzhuang Gymnasium; Attendance: 3,280

October 30, 2025	Changwon LG Sakers (South Korea)	78–90	(Chinese Taipei) New Taipei Kings	Changwon
19:10 (UTC+9)	Scoring by quarter: 17–31, 26–12, 22–27, 13–20
	Pts: Assem Marei, Yang Jun-seok 16; Rebs: Assem Marei 14; Asts: Yang Jun-seok 10	Boxscore	Pts: Sani Sakakini 33; Rebs: Jayden Gardner 10; Asts: Austin Daye 8	Arena: Changwon Gymnasium

November 1, 2025	Ulaanbaatar Xac Broncos (Mongolia)	90–76	(Chinese Taipei) New Taipei Kings	Ulaanbaatar
17:10 (UTC+8)	Scoring by quarter: 35–18, 17–20, 12–14, 26–24
	Pts: Ian Miller 40; Rebs: Efe Odigie 21; Asts: Baatar-Erdene Barsbold 5	Boxscore	Pts: Sani Sakakini 24; Rebs: Jayden Gardner 16; Asts: Jayden Gardner 5	Arena: M bank Arena

November 19, 2025	New Taipei Kings (Chinese Taipei)	93–87	(South Korea) Changwon LG Sakers	New Taipei City
19:10 (UTC+8)	Scoring by quarter: 24–22, 23–21, 25–28, 21–16
	Pts: Sani Sakakini 25; Rebs: Sani Sakakini 9 Asts: Lee Kai-Yan 9	Boxscore	Pts: Micheal Eric 21; Rebs: Assem Marei 16; Asts: Assem Marei 7	Arena: Xinzhuang Gymnasium; Attendance: 2,908

December 6, 2025	New Taipei Kings (Chinese Taipei)	109–94	(Mongolia) Ulaanbaatar Xac Broncos	New Taipei City
17:10 (UTC+8)	Scoring by quarter: 34–29, 27–16, 23–16, 25–33
	Pts: Jalen Harris 35; Rebs: Jason Washburn 10; Asts: Joseph Lin, Su Shih-Hsuan 4	Boxscore	Pts: Efe Odigie 29; Rebs: Efe Odigie 18; Asts: Ian Miller 10	Arena: Xinzhuang Gymnasium; Attendance: 3,394

February 4, 2025	Alvark Tokyo (Japan)	92–79	(Chinese Taipei) New Taipei Kings	Tachikawa
19:10 (UTC+9)	Scoring by quarter: 20–13, 22–24, 30–20, 20–22
	Pts: Marcus Foster 29; Rebs: Ryan Rossiter 12; Asts: Ryan Rossiter 10	Boxscore	Pts: Jalen Harris 24; Rebs: Jason Washburn 9 Asts: Jalen Harris 7	Arena: Arena Tachikawa Tachihi; Attendance: 2,459

=== Finals ===
==== Quarterfinals ====
March 18, 2026	Utsunomiya Brex (Japan)	85–64	(Chinese Taipei) New Taipei Kings	Macau
19:30 (UTC+8)	Scoring by quarter: 12–23, 36–14, 19–13, 18–14
	Pts: Grant Jerrett 27; Rebs: Grant Jerrett 12; Asts: D.J. Newbill 6	Boxscore	Pts: Jalen Harris 18; Rebs: Jason Washburn 10; Asts: Jalen Harris 5	Arena: Tap Seac Multi-sports Pavilion

== Basketball Champions League Asia ==
=== BCL Asia – East ===
==== Standings ====
Pos	Team	Pld	W	L	PF	PA	PD	Pts	Qualification
1	(Chinese Taipei) Taoyuan Pauian Pilots	6	6	0	548	461	+87	12	Advance to Final 6
2	(Mongolia) Chinggis Broncos	6	2	4	514	487	+27	8	Advance to Final 6
3	(Hong Kong) South China	6	2	4	528	537	−9	8	Advance to Final 6
4	(Chinese Taipei) New Taipei Kings	6	2	4	492	597	−105	8	

Source: FIBA

==== Group stage ====
April 7, 2026	South China (Hong Kong)	103–82	(Chinese Taipei) New Taipei Kings	Hong Kong
20:00 (UTC+8)	Scoring by quarter: 29–24, 27–16, 21–14, 26–28
	Pts: Rodrigue Andela 22; Rebs: Rodrigue Andela 13; Asts: Dominic Gilbert 8	Report	Pts: Jayden Gardner 31; Rebs: Jordan Tolbert 10; Asts: Su Pei-Kai, Lin Yan-Ting 5	Arena: Southorn Stadium; Attendance: 2,000; Referees: Cheon Kam-Jae (KOR), Chan Owe Shiong (MAS), Ong Jin Leong (SGP)

April 14, 2026	Taoyuan Pauian Pilots (Chinese Taipei)	110–85	(Chinese Taipei) New Taipei Kings	Taipei City
19:00 (UTC+8)	Scoring by quarter: 27–23, 38–11, 21–23, 24–28
	Pts: Setric Millner 31; Rebs: Alec Brown, Will Artino 13; Asts: Chen Chiang-Shuang 9	Report	Pts: Jalen Harris 28; Rebs: Jordan Tolbert 7 Asts: three players 3	Arena: University of Taipei, Tian-Mu Campus Gymnasium; Attendance: 927; Referees: Nattapong Jontapa (THA), Budi Marfan (INA), Hum Zhung Liang (MAS)

April 18, 2026	New Taipei Kings (Chinese Taipei)	107–99	(Hong Kong) South China	Taipei City
17:00 (UTC+8)	Scoring by quarter: 30–25, 22–19, 29–26, 26–29
	Pts: Jalen Harris 34; Rebs: Jordan Tolbert 6 Asts: Jalen Harris 7	Report	Pts: Rodrigue Andela 26; Rebs: Rodrigue Andela 12; Asts: Glen Yang 9	Arena: University of Taipei, Tian-Mu Campus Gymnasium; Attendance: 509; Referees: Budi Marfan (INA), Alexey Stepanenko (KAZ), Nattapong Jontapa (THA)

April 19, 2026	New Taipei Kings (Chinese Taipei)	80–79	(Mongolia) Chinggis Broncos	Taipei City
17:00 (UTC+8)	Scoring by quarter: 27–17, 21–24, 23–16, 9–22
	Pts: Jayden Gardner 26; Rebs: Jordan Tolbert 15; Asts: Jalen Harris 11	Report	Pts: Jordy Tshimanga 27; Rebs: Jordy Tshimanga 12; Asts: Ian Miller 9	Arena: University of Taipei, Tian-Mu Campus Gymnasium; Attendance: 536; Referees: Alexey Stepanenko (KAZ), Preeda Muongmee (THA), Hum Zhung Liang (MAS)

April 26, 2026	New Taipei Kings (Chinese Taipei)	63–98	(Chinese Taipei) Taoyuan Pauian Pilots	New Taipei City
17:00 (UTC+8)	Scoring by quarter: 20–28, 11–26, 18–22, 14–22
	Pts: Jayden Gardner 18; Rebs: Jordan Tolbert 10; Asts: Lin Yan-Ting 7	Report	Pts: Setric Millner 30; Rebs: Will Artino 14; Asts: Setric Millner 5	Arena: Xinzhuang Gymnasium; Attendance: 1,559; Referees: Daigo Urushima (JPN), Glenn Cornelio (PHI), Lee Seung-Mu (KOR)

May 8, 2026	Chinggis Broncos (Mongolia)	108–75	(Chinese Taipei) New Taipei Kings	Ulaanbaatar
19:00 (UTC+8)	Scoring by quarter: 33–16, 27–14, 30–22, 18–23
	Pts: Stedmon Lemon 26; Rebs: Jordy Tshimanga 15; Asts: Baatar-Erdene Barsbold 11	Report	Pts: Su Pei-Kai 18; Rebs: Lin Chin-Pang 7 Asts: Su Pei-Kai 5	Arena: M bank Arena; Attendance: 1,172; Referees: Lee Kyoung-Hwan (KOR), Anton Kozlov (KAZ), Suebpong Wichaiphin (THA)

== Player statistics ==
Legend
GP	Games played	MPG	Minutes per game	FG%	Field goal percentage
3P%	3-point field goal percentage	FT%	Free throw percentage	RPG	Rebounds per game
APG	Assists per game	SPG	Steals per game	BPG	Blocks per game
PPG	Points per game		Led the league

=== Regular season ===
Player	GP	MPG	PPG	FG%	3P%	FT%	RPG	APG	SPG	BPG
Jalen Harris^{≠}	14	34:12	25.9	50.0%	36.5%	81.0%	5.9	4.9	1.1	0.4
Joseph Lin	32	36:23	11.8	37.1%	32.5%	77.1%	3.3	7.0	1.1	0.3
Su Pei-Kai	16	3:06	1.2	33.3%	25.0%	28.6%	0.4	0.3	0.0	0.1
Jayden Gardner	18	30:42	16.9	51.4%	17.1%	51.1%	10.0	1.7	0.9	0.4
Chung Li-Hsiang	9	2:36	0.2	33.3%	0.0%	0.0%	0.4	0.1	0.3	0.0
Lee Kai-Yan	25	30:52	11.0	37.0%	23.6%	68.5%	3.7	3.8	1.5	0.4
Chien You-Che	28	14:27	3.0	35.3%	34.0%	62.5%	1.9	0.4	0.7	0.1
Wang Po-Chih	21	4:20	1.5	40.0%	0.0%	42.9%	1.0	0.1	0.2	0.1
Lin Yan-Ting	35	27:02	8.9	39.8%	32.9%	69.2%	3.3	3.3	1.2	0.1
Lu Cheng-Ju	31	12:00	3.5	39.1%	39.2%	87.5%	0.9	0.5	0.2	0.1
Olufemi Olujobi^{≠}	15	30:50	18.6	50.3%	42.3%	75.3%	8.0	2.0	0.6	0.1
Chaundee Brown^{‡}	7	27:24	11.1	38.8%	15.6%	64.7%	7.0	1.3	0.9	0.3
Su Shih-Hsuan	29	17:29	4.5	37.8%	33.3%	73.3%	3.5	1.1	0.5	0.4
Lin Chin-Pang	21	7:49	1.5	27.0%	27.3%	62.5%	0.8	0.5	0.3	0.0
Ryder Hsiung	34	17:53	5.6	41.8%	41.5%	84.6%	1.7	0.3	0.8	0.2
Hung Chih-Shan	3	17:44	5.0	62.5%	62.5%	0.0%	1.3	1.3	0.3	0.0
Austin Daye	18	24:28	13.1	44.3%	33.3%	87.1%	6.3	2.5	0.7	0.3
Jonathan Smith	22	6:30	1.5	29.3%	27.6%	50.0%	0.5	0.3	0.1	0.0
Sani Sakakini^{‡}	5	39:02	24.6	43.8%	37.5%	91.3%	10.6	2.6	1.0	0.2
Jordan Tolbert^{≠}	5	34:16	14.4	52.8%	66.7%	66.7%	12.0	3.0	0.6	0.8
Jason Washburn	26	33:29	18.5	57.5%	10.5%	76.8%	10.7	1.6	1.0	1.1

^{‡} Left during the season
^{≠} Acquired during the season

=== Play-in ===
Player	GP	MPG	PPG	FG%	3P%	FT%	RPG	APG	SPG	BPG
Jalen Harris	2	37:31	22.5	47.2%	23.1%	66.7%	9.5	4.5	0.5	0.0
Joseph Lin	2	40:20	20.0	46.9%	50.0%	100.0%	7.0	8.0	1.0	0.0
Su Pei-Kai	Did not play									
Chung Li-Hsiang	Did not play									
Lee Kai-Yan	2	25:03	3.0	30.0%	0.0%	0.0%	2.0	2.0	1.0	0.0
Chien You-Che	1	0:52	0.0	0.0%	0.0%	0.0%	0.0	0.0	0.0	0.0
Wang Po-Chih	1	4:12	5.0	66.7%	100.0%	0.0%	0.0	0.0	0.0	0.0
Lin Yan-Ting	2	23:06	6.0	35.7%	16.7%	50.0%	2.5	2.5	0.0	0.5
Lu Cheng-Ju	Did not play									
Olufemi Olujobi	1	28:29	15.0	44.4%	33.3%	83.3%	4.0	1.0	0.0	0.0
Su Shih-Hsuan	2	29:55	7.5	31.3%	50.0%	0.0%	6.5	1.0	1.5	0.5
Lin Chin-Pang	Did not play									
Ryder Hsiung	2	22:10	7.5	62.5%	62.5%	0.0%	1.5	1.0	0.5	0.5
Austin Daye	2	28:46	14.5	43.8%	41.7%	83.3%	9.5	3.5	0.0	0.5
Jonathan Smith	1	0:10	0.0	0.0%	0.0%	0.0%	0.0	0.0	0.0	0.0
Jason Washburn	1	32:31	16.0	61.5%	0.0%	0.0%	8.0	1.0	1.0	1.0

=== Semifinals ===
Player	GP	MPG	PPG	FG%	3P%	FT%	RPG	APG	SPG	BPG
Jalen Harris	4	40:50	22.8	47.5%	50.0%	80.0%	8.0	6.0	1.8	0.8
Joseph Lin	4	38:11	17.0	46.3%	54.5%	60.0%	5.0	6.0	1.0	0.3
Su Pei-Kai	1	2:41	1.0	0.0%	0.0%	50.0%	3.0	0.0	0.0	0.0
Chung Li-Hsiang	Did not play									
Lee Kai-Yan	3	23:22	7.7	42.1%	28.6%	38.5%	3.7	1.3	1.3	0.0
Chien You-Che	3	15:14	3.7	83.3%	50.0%	0.0%	1.3	0.0	0.3	0.0
Wang Po-Chih	3	1:35	0.0	0.0%	0.0%	0.0%	0.3	0.0	0.0	0.3
Lin Yan-Ting	4	31:16	15.0	60.5%	55.6%	66.7%	3.0	3.5	2.0	0.3
Lu Cheng-Ju	3	6:35	1.0	25.0%	25.0%	0.0%	0.7	0.3	0.3	0.0
Olufemi Olujobi	2	25:52	15.0	50.0%	16.7%	75.0%	4.5	1.0	0.5	1.0
Su Shih-Hsuan	4	17:08	7.0	66.7%	40.0%	50.0%	4.0	0.3	0.0	0.8
Lin Chin-Pang	4	7:53	1.5	33.3%	0.0%	0.0%	0.8	1.0	0.3	0.0
Ryder Hsiung	4	14:00	5.8	61.5%	58.3%	0.0%	0.5	0.3	0.0	0.0
Austin Daye	3	26:22	11.7	40.6%	38.9%	50.0%	7.0	3.7	1.0	0.3
Jonathan Smith	2	1:55	0.0	0.0%	0.0%	0.0%	0.0	0.0	0.0	0.0
Jason Washburn	3	28:17	15.3	50.0%	0.0%	82.4%	11.7	2.3	0.3	2.0

=== Finals ===
Player	GP	MPG	PPG	FG%	3P%	FT%	RPG	APG	SPG	BPG
Jalen Harris	6	36:44	23.2	44.2%	42.6%	84.4%	5.7	3.5	1.5	0.5
Joseph Lin	7	35:29	12.0	38.5%	28.6%	80.0%	3.1	4.9	1.0	0.3
Su Pei-Kai	3	2:57	0.0	0.0%	0.0%	0.0%	0.3	0.0	0.0	0.0
Chung Li-Hsiang	Did not play									
Lee Kai-Yan	7	22:19	7.7	30.9%	40.0%	63.2%	3.0	1.6	0.7	0.4
Chien You-Che	6	7:55	1.0	42.9%	0.0%	0.0%	1.3	0.2	0.2	0.2
Wang Po-Chih	4	3:31	1.0	50.0%	0.0%	0.0%	1.5	0.3	0.0	0.0
Lin Yan-Ting	7	25:00	7.3	35.3%	25.8%	58.3%	1.7	1.7	1.0	0.1
Lu Cheng-Ju	7	12:05	3.9	42.9%	41.2%	100.0%	1.1	0.4	0.1	0.0
Olufemi Olujobi	1	33:55	10.0	30.0%	33.3%	42.9%	7.0	1.0	1.0	0.0
Su Shih-Hsuan	7	22:34	5.0	37.0%	38.9%	80.0%	3.7	1.4	0.4	0.6
Lin Chin-Pang	5	1:18	0.0	0.0%	0.0%	0.0%	0.4	0.0	0.2	0.0
Ryder Hsiung	7	16:57	4.0	47.4%	43.8%	100.0%	1.4	0.4	0.1	0.3
Austin Daye	7	22:07	10.4	34.7%	24.1%	94.1%	5.6	2.1	0.4	0.0
Jonathan Smith	4	2:43	1.0	50.0%	0.0%	100.0%	0.3	0.0	0.3	0.0
Jason Washburn	7	34:32	15.1	65.2%	100.0%	61.3%	8.9	0.9	0.9	0.6

- Reference：

== Transactions ==
On December 18, 2025, Sani Sakakini took a plane to Jordan for recovery. On March 9, 2026, Jayden Gardner, Hung Chih-Shan, and Jordan Tolbert were not registered in the 2025–26 TPBL season final rosters. On April 9, Sina Vahedi went back home for recovery.

=== Overview ===
Players added

Via draft

- Ryder Hsiung
- Jonathan Smith

Via free agency

- Chaundee Brown
- Chung Li-Hsiang
- Quincy Davis
- Jayden Gardner
- Jalen Harris
- Lin Yan-Ting
- Olufemi Olujobi
- Jordan Tolbert
- Sina Vahedi
Players lost

Via free agency

- Chen Chun-Nan
- Ifeanyi Eboka
- Lin Li-Jen
- Kenny Manigault

Waived

- Chaundee Brown

Retirement

- Jeremy Lin

=== Free agency ===
==== Re-signed ====
Date	Player	Contract terms	Ref.
July 25, 2025	Chien You-Che	—N/a	
July 26, 2025	Wang Po-Chih	—N/a	
August 6, 2025	Joseph Lin	3-year contract, worth unknown	
August 13, 2025	Jason Washburn	—N/a	
August 14, 2025	Austin Daye	—N/a	
August 29, 2025	Hung Chih-Shan	—N/a	
September 3, 2025	Sani Sakakini	—N/a	

==== Additions ====
Date	Player	Contract terms	Former team	Ref.
August 19, 2025	Jayden Gardner	—N/a	(Germany) SC Rasta Vechta	
August 21, 2025	Chaundee Brown	—N/a	(Japan) Kobe Storks	
September 4, 2025	Jonathan Smith	—N/a	(Taiwan) NTUA	
September 4, 2025	Ryder Hsiung	—N/a	(United States) Willamette	
September 5, 2025	Lin Yan-Ting	—N/a	(China) Beijing Royal Fighters	
October 7, 2025	Chung Li-Hsiang	Trainee contract, worth unknown	(Taiwan) NCCU	
November 25, 2025	Jalen Harris	—N/a	(Canada) Winnipeg Sea Bears	
January 16, 2026	Olufemi Olujobi	—N/a	(Japan) Altiri Chiba	
January 26, 2026	Jordan Tolbert	—N/a	(Mongolia) BCH Knights	
March 5, 2026	Sina Vahedi	—N/a	(Philippines) Meralco Bolts	
March 13, 2026	Quincy Davis	EASL player contract, worth unknown	(Taiwan) Yankey Ark	

==== Subtractions ====
Date	Player	Reason	New team	Ref.
July 5, 2025	Kenny Manigault	Career decision	(Japan) Fukushima Firebonds	
July 31, 2025	Chen Chun-Nan	Contract expired	(Taiwan) Yulon	
August 1, 2025	Lin Li-Jen	Contract expired → Retirement	—N/a	
August 21, 2025	Ifeanyi Eboka	Contract expired	(Taiwan) Changhua Pauian BLL	
August 31, 2025	Jeremy Lin	Retirement	—N/a	
January 10, 2026	Chaundee Brown	Contract terminated	(United Kingdom) London Lions	

== Awards ==
=== Yearly awards ===
Recipient	Award	Ref.
Lee Kai-Yan	All-Defensive First Team	

=== Player of the Week ===
Week	Recipient	Award	Ref.
1	Jayden Gardner	Week 1 Player of the Week	
10	Jason Washburn	Week 10 Player of the Week	
16	Joseph Lin	Week 16 Player of the Week	
19	Jalen Harris	Week 19 Player of the Week	
