= 2026–27 New Taipei Kings season =

Taiwanese professional basketball season

- President: Walter Wang
- General Manager: James Mao
- Head Coach: Hung Chih-Shan
- Arena: Xinzhuang Gymnasium

TPBL results
- Record: 3–2 (60.0%)
- Place: TBD
- Playoffs finish: TBD

The 2026–27 New Taipei Kings season is the franchise's sixth season, its third season in the Taiwan Professional Basketball League (TPBL).

On July 22, 2026, the Kings promoted Hung Chih-Shan, the interim head coach of the New Taipei Kings, as their new head coach.

== Draft ==
Round	Pick	Player	Position(s)	School / club team
1	5	Pan Wei-Jie	Guard	UCH

- Reference：

== Roster ==
New Taipei Kings roster
Players
Coaches

Pos.	No.	Nat.	Name	Ht.	Wt.	Age	From
G	1	(United States) (Taiwan)	Joseph Lin	1.82 m (6 ft 0 in)	69 kg (152 lb)	34 – 21 June 1992	Hamilton
F	2	(United States)	Kendall Lewis (I)	2.03 m (6 ft 8 in)	95 kg (209 lb)	25 – 19 April 2001	Illinois State
G	3	(United States)	Craig Sword (I)	1.91 m (6 ft 3 in)	89 kg (196 lb)	32 – 16 January 1994	Mississippi State
G	5	(Taiwan)	Pan Wei-Jie	1.80 m (5 ft 11 in)	82 kg (181 lb)	22 – 28 February 2004	UCH
G/F	6	(Taiwan)	Chou Yi-Hsiang	1.91 m (6 ft 3 in)	101 kg (223 lb)	35 – 4 February 1991	Salt Lake CC
G	8	(Taiwan)	Lin Yan-Ting	1.85 m (6 ft 1 in)	85 kg (187 lb)	26 – 22 October 2000	NCCU
G	9	(Taiwan)	Lee Kai-Yan	1.82 m (6 ft 0 in)	80 kg (176 lb)	33 – 6 May 1993	HWU
G	10	(Taiwan)	Chien You-Che	1.80 m (5 ft 11 in)	80 kg (176 lb)	31 – 10 September 1995	UCH
C	11	(Taiwan)	Wang Po-Chih	1.97 m (6 ft 6 in)	130 kg (287 lb)	30 – 29 October 1996	NTSU
F	17	(Taiwan)	Su Shih-Hsuan (C)	1.97 m (6 ft 6 in)	95 kg (209 lb)	30 – 9 April 1996	NTNU
F	20	(United States) (Taiwan)	Ryder Hsiung	1.92 m (6 ft 4 in)	76 kg (168 lb)	23 – 14 April 2003	Willamette
PF/C	22	(United States)	Tanner Groves (I)	2.08 m (6 ft 10 in)	109 kg (240 lb)	27 – 22 May 1999	Oklahoma
F	26	(Taiwan)	Jonathan Smith	1.87 m (6 ft 2 in)	87 kg (192 lb)	23 – 9 May 2003	NTUA
G	29	(Taiwan)	Chuang Chao-Sheng	1.76 m (5 ft 9 in)	74 kg (163 lb)	23 – 9 February 2003	NCCU
F	31	(Taiwan)	Hsiao Shun-Yi	1.93 m (6 ft 4 in)	86 kg (190 lb)	34 – 23 October 1992	NTUA
C	40	(United States)	Thomas Welsh (injured) (I)	2.13 m (7 ft 0 in)	111 kg (245 lb)	30 – 3 February 1996	UCLA
C	42	(United States) (Bulgaria)	Jason Washburn (I)	2.13 m (7 ft 0 in)	111 kg (245 lb)	36 – 5 June 1990	Utah

Head coach

- (Taiwan) Hung Chih-Shan

Assistant coach(es)

- (United States) Erik Olson
- (Taiwan) Wei Wei
- (Lebanon) Nabil Kabalan
- (Taiwan) Lee Wei-En

Strength & conditioning coach(es)

- (Taiwan) Chang Chung-Hsi
- (Taiwan) Chao Te

Athletic trainer(s)

- (Taiwan) Chiu Po-Kai
- (Taiwan) Wu Chung-Hao

Team manager

- (Taiwan) James Mao

Legend

- (C) Team captain
- (I) Import player
- Injured

- Roster
- Transactions
Updated: November 15, 2026

== 2026 The Asian Tournament Chengdu Leg ==
=== Group match ===
August 17, 2026	Philippine Aces United	77–90	New Taipei Kings	Chengdu
20:00 (UTC+8)	Scoring by quarter: 22–28, 19–20, 24–21, 12–21
	Pts: De'Vondre Perry 20; Rebs: Seny N'Diaye 13; Asts: Kobey Lam 3	boxscore	Pts: Lin Yan-Ting 16; Rebs: Kendall Lewis, Craig Sword 7 Asts: Lin Yan-Ting 5	Arena: Jianyang Cultural and Sports Center Gymnasium

August 18, 2026	New Taipei Kings	82–57	Shenzhen New Century II	Chengdu
17:30 (UTC+8)	Scoring by quarter: 25–8, 13–21, 19–9, 25–19
	Pts: three players 14; Rebs: Kendall Lewis 8 Asts: Lin Yan-Ting 6	boxscore	Pts: Shan Yonghan 17; Rebs: Ihor Serheiev 15; Asts: Lan Yilang 7	Arena: Jianyang Cultural and Sports Center Gymnasium

August 19, 2026	Statham Academy	88–76	New Taipei Kings	Chengdu
15:30 (UTC+8)	Scoring by quarter: 30–17, 20–22, 15–15, 23–22
	Pts: Amari Haynes 22; Rebs: Taylor Statham 14; Asts: Travis Divita, Taylor Statham 5	boxscore	Pts: Kendall Lewis, Craig Sword 18; Rebs: Kendall Lewis 15; Asts: three players 4	Arena: Jianyang Cultural and Sports Center Gymnasium

=== Quarterfinals ===
August 20, 2026	New Taipei Kings	98–73	Macau Black Knights	Chengdu
20:00 (UTC+8)	Scoring by quarter: 25–18, 28–16, 24–19, 21–20
	Pts: Craig Sword 20; Rebs: Kendall Lewis 9 Asts: Craig Sword 7	boxscore	Pts: Noah Neumann 23; Rebs: Toluwalope Obasa 14; Asts: Noah Neumann 7	Arena: Jianyang Cultural and Sports Center Gymnasium

=== Semifinals ===
August 22, 2026	Shenzhen New Century II	74–101	New Taipei Kings	Chengdu
18:00 (UTC+8)	Scoring by quarter: 15–30, 22–18, 19–28, 18–25
		boxscore		Arena: Jianyang Cultural and Sports Center Gymnasium

=== Finals ===
August 23, 2026	New Taipei Kings	88–76	Philippine Aces United	Chengdu
20:00 (UTC+8)	Scoring by quarter: 22–16, 26–14, 23–23, 17–23
	Pts: Craig Sword 27; Rebs: Kendall Lewis 16; Asts: Kendall Lewis 5	boxscore	Pts: Kobey Lam 23; Rebs: De'Vondre Perry 8 Asts: Lamonte Bearden 2	Arena: Jianyang Cultural and Sports Center Gymnasium

== Preseason Exhibition Game ==
The Preseason Exhibition Game was played in Alpha Basketball. Thomas Welsh, Jason Washburn, Chien You-Che, and Wang Po-Chih did not participate in the exhibition game.

September 13, 2026
14:30 (UTC+8)

Macau Black Knights	2–3	New Taipei Kings
Scoring by quarter: 14–21, 27–21, 22–13, 11–21, 12–22

Xinzhuang Gymnasium, New Taipei City

== Preseason ==
=== Game log ===
2026 preseason game log
Total: 2–0 (home: 1–0; road: 1–0)
Preseason : 2–0 (home: 1–0; road: 1–0)

Game	Date	Team	Score	High points	High rebounds	High assists	Location Attendance	Record
1	October 10	Leopards	W 107–93	Craig Sword (20)	Craig Sword (9); Kendall Lewis (9)	Craig Sword (3); Jason Washburn (3); Joseph Lin (3)	Taipei Heping Basketball Gymnasium	1–0
2	October 11	@ Lioneers	W 100–97	Jason Washburn (25)	Jason Washburn (13)	Joseph Lin (7)	Taipei Heping Basketball Gymnasium	2–0

Color： Win Lose
Schedule

== Regular season ==
=== Standings ===
Pos	Team	Pld	W	L	PCT	GB	Qualification
1	Kaohsiung Aquas	5	3	2	.600	—	Advance to semifinals
2	New Taipei Kings	5	3	2	.600	—	Advance to semifinals
3	New Taipei CTBC DEA	4	2	2	.500	0.5	Advance to semifinals
4	Taipei Taishin Mars	4	2	2	.500	0.5	Advance to play-in
5	Taoyuan Taiwan Beer Leopards	4	2	2	.500	0.5	Advance to play-in
6	Hsinchu Toplus Lioneers	3	1	2	.333	1	
7	Formosa Dreamers	3	1	2	.333	1	

Source: TPBL

=== Game log ===
2026–27 regular season game log
Total: 3–2 (home: 0–2; road: 3–0)
October : 2–1 (home: 0–1; road: 2–0)

Game	Date	Team	Score	High points	High rebounds	High assists	Location Attendance	Record
1	October 17	@ Dreamers	W 113–106 (OT)	Kendall Lewis (33)	Kendall Lewis (13)	Craig Sword (5); Joseph Lin (5)	Taichung Intercontinental Basketball Stadium; 3,000	1–0
2	October 25	@ DEA	W 89–81	Joseph Lin (18)	Kendall Lewis (12)	Joseph Lin (6)	Xinzhuang Gymnasium; 4,146	2–0
3	October 31	Leopards	L 81–89	Craig Sword (25)	Thomas Welsh (9); Kendall Lewis (9); Lee Kai-Yan (9)	Craig Sword (5)	Xinzhuang Gymnasium; 4,202	2–1

November : 1–1 (home: 0–1; road: 1–0)

Game	Date	Team	Score	High points	High rebounds	High assists	Location Attendance	Record
4	November 1	Lioneers	L 93–95	Lin Yan-Ting (21)	Jason Washburn (8); Kendall Lewis (8)	Lee Kai-Yan (6)	Xinzhuang Gymnasium; 4,109	2–2
5	November 15	@ Leopards	W 110–93	Joseph Lin (27)	Craig Sword (10)	Craig Sword (10)	Taoyuan Arena; 5,233	3–2

December : 0–0 (home: 0–0; road: 0–0)

Game	Date	Team	Score	High points	High rebounds	High assists	Location Attendance	Record
6	December 2	Mars	0–0	()	()	()	Xinzhuang Gymnasium	–
7	December 4	DEA	0–0	()	()	()	Xinzhuang Gymnasium	–
8	December 12	@ Dreamers	0–0	()	()	()	Taichung Intercontinental Basketball Stadium	–
9	December 19	Aquas	0–0	()	()	()	Xinzhuang Gymnasium	–
10	December 20	Lioneers	0–0	()	()	()	Xinzhuang Gymnasium	–
11	December 23	@ Leopards	0–0	()	()	()	Taoyuan Arena	–
12	December 26	@ Mars	0–0	()	()	()	Taipei Heping Basketball Gymnasium	–

January : 0–0 (home: 0–0; road: 0–0)

Game	Date	Team	Score	High points	High rebounds	High assists	Location Attendance	Record
13	January 2	@ Aquas	0–0	()	()	()	Kaohsiung Arena	–
14	January 6	@ Lioneers	0–0	()	()	()	Hsinchu County Stadium	–
15	January 16	@ Mars	0–0	()	()	()	Taipei Heping Basketball Gymnasium	–
16	January 30	Dreamers	0–0	()	()	()	Xinzhuang Gymnasium	–
17	January 31	DEA	0–0	()	()	()	Xinzhuang Gymnasium	–

February : 0–0 (home: 0–0; road: 0–0)

Game	Date	Team	Score	High points	High rebounds	High assists	Location Attendance	Record
18	February 14	@ Leopards	0–0	()	()	()	Taoyuan Arena	–
19	February 20	Mars	0–0	()	()	()	Xinzhuang Gymnasium	–
20	February 21	Leopards	0–0	()	()	()	Xinzhuang Gymnasium	–
21	February 28	@ Mars	0–0	()	()	()	Taipei Heping Basketball Gymnasium	–

March : 0–0 (home: 0–0; road: 0–0)

Game	Date	Team	Score	High points	High rebounds	High assists	Location Attendance	Record
22	March 6	Dreamers	0–0	()	()	()		–
23	March 7	Aquas	0–0	()	()	()		–
24	March 13	Lioneers	0–0	()	()	()		–
25	March 14	Leopards	0–0	()	()	()		–
26	March 20	@ DEA	0–0	()	()	()		–
27	March 28	@ Aquas	0–0	()	()	()	Kaohsiung Arena	–

April : 0–0 (home: 0–0; road: 0–0)

Game	Date	Team	Score	High points	High rebounds	High assists	Location Attendance	Record
28	April 11	@ Lioneers	0–0	()	()	()	Hsinchu County Stadium	–
29	April 17	@ Dreamers	0–0	()	()	()	Taichung Intercontinental Basketball Stadium	–
30	April 24	@ Aquas	0–0	()	()	()	Kaohsiung Arena	–
31	April 28	Mars	0–0	()	()	()	Xinzhuang Gymnasium	–

May : 0–0 (home: 0–0; road: 0–0)

Game	Date	Team	Score	High points	High rebounds	High assists	Location Attendance	Record
32	May 1	DEA	0–0	()	()	()	Xinzhuang Gymnasium	–
33	May 2	Dreamers	0–0	()	()	()	Xinzhuang Gymnasium	–
34	May 7	Aquas	0–0	()	()	()	Xinzhuang Gymnasium	–
35	May 9	@ Lioneers	0–0	()	()	()	Hsinchu County Stadium	–
36	May 15	@ DEA	0–0	()	()	()	Xinzhuang Gymnasium	–

Color： Win Lose
Schedule

== Player statistics ==
Legend
GP	Games played	MPG	Minutes per game	FG%	Field goal percentage
3P%	3-point field goal percentage	FT%	Free throw percentage	RPG	Rebounds per game
APG	Assists per game	SPG	Steals per game	BPG	Blocks per game
PPG	Points per game		Led the league

=== Regular season ===
Player	GP	MPG	PPG	FG%	3P%	FT%	RPG	APG	SPG	BPG
Joseph Lin										
Kendall Lewis										
Craig Sword										
Pan Wei-Jie										
Chou Yi-Hsiang										
Lin Yan-Ting										
Lee Kai-Yan										
Chien You-Che										
Wang Po-Chih										
Su Shih-Hsuan										
Ryder Hsiung										
Tanner Groves										
Jonathan Smith										
Chuang Chao-Sheng										
Hsiao Shun-Yi										
Thomas Welsh										
Jason Washburn										

- Reference：

== Transactions ==
=== Overview ===
Players added

Via draft

- Pan Wei-Jie

Via free agency

- Chou Yi-Hsiang
- Chuang Chao-Sheng
- Tanner Groves
- Hsiao Shun-Yi
- Kendall Lewis
- Craig Sword
- Thomas Welsh
Players lost

Via free agency

- Chung Li-Hsiang
- Quincy Davis
- Jayden Gardner
- Jalen Harris
- Lin Chin-Pang
- Lu Cheng-Ju
- Olufemi Olujobi
- Sani Sakakini
- Su Pei-Kai
- Jordan Tolbert
- Sina Vahedi

Retirement

- Austin Daye

Assigned to head coach

- Hung Chih-Shan

=== Free agency ===
==== Re-signed ====
Date	Player	Contract terms	Ref.
August 5, 2026	Jason Washburn	—N/a	

==== Additions ====
Date	Player	Contract terms	Former team	Ref.
July 15, 2026	Craig Sword	—N/a	(Mexico) Rayos de Hermosillo	
July 26, 2026	Tanner Groves	—N/a	(Japan) Saga Ballooners	
July 28, 2026	Kendall Lewis	—N/a	(Romania) Argeș Pitești	
July 29, 2026	Thomas Welsh	—N/a	(Japan) Sun Rockers Shibuya	
July 31, 2026	Hsiao Shun-Yi	—N/a	(Taiwan) Hsinchu Toplus Lioneers	
August 7, 2026	Chou Yi-Hsiang	—N/a	(Taiwan) Caesar Keelung Black Kites	
August 14, 2026	Pan Wei-Jie	—N/a	(Taiwan) UCH	
September 2, 2026	Chuang Chao-Sheng	—N/a	(Taiwan) Yankey Ark	

==== Subtractions ====
Date	Player	Reason	New team	Ref.
May 3, 2026	Austin Daye	Retirement	—N/a	
July 8, 2026	Jayden Gardner	Contract expired	(Japan) Veltex Shizuoka	
July 8, 2026	Olufemi Olujobi	Contract expired	(South Korea) Goyang Sono Skygunners	
July 8, 2026	Jordan Tolbert	Contract expired	(Mongolia) Selenge Bodons	
July 14, 2026	Lu Cheng-Ju	Contract expired → Retirement	(Taiwan) NTSU basketball team coach	
July 14, 2026	Su Pei-Kai	Contract expired	(Taiwan) TSG GhostHawks	
July 22, 2026	Hung Chih-Shan	Assigned to head coach	(Taiwan) New Taipei Kings head coach	
August 5, 2026	Jalen Harris	Contract expired	—N/a	
August 5, 2026	Sina Vahedi	Contract expired	—N/a	
August 5, 2026	Sani Sakakini	Contract expired	Kuwait	
August 5, 2026	Quincy Davis	Contract expired	—N/a	
August 31, 2026	Lin Chin-Pang	Contract expired	—N/a	
October 13, 2026	Chung Li-Hsiang	Contract expired	—N/a	

== Awards ==
=== Player of the Week ===
Week	Recipient	Award	Ref.
2	Joseph Lin	Week 2 Player of the Week (local)	
5	Joseph Lin	Week 5 Player of the Week (local)	
5	Craig Sword	Week 5 Player of the Week (import)	
