= Tanner Groves =

American basketball player (born 1999)

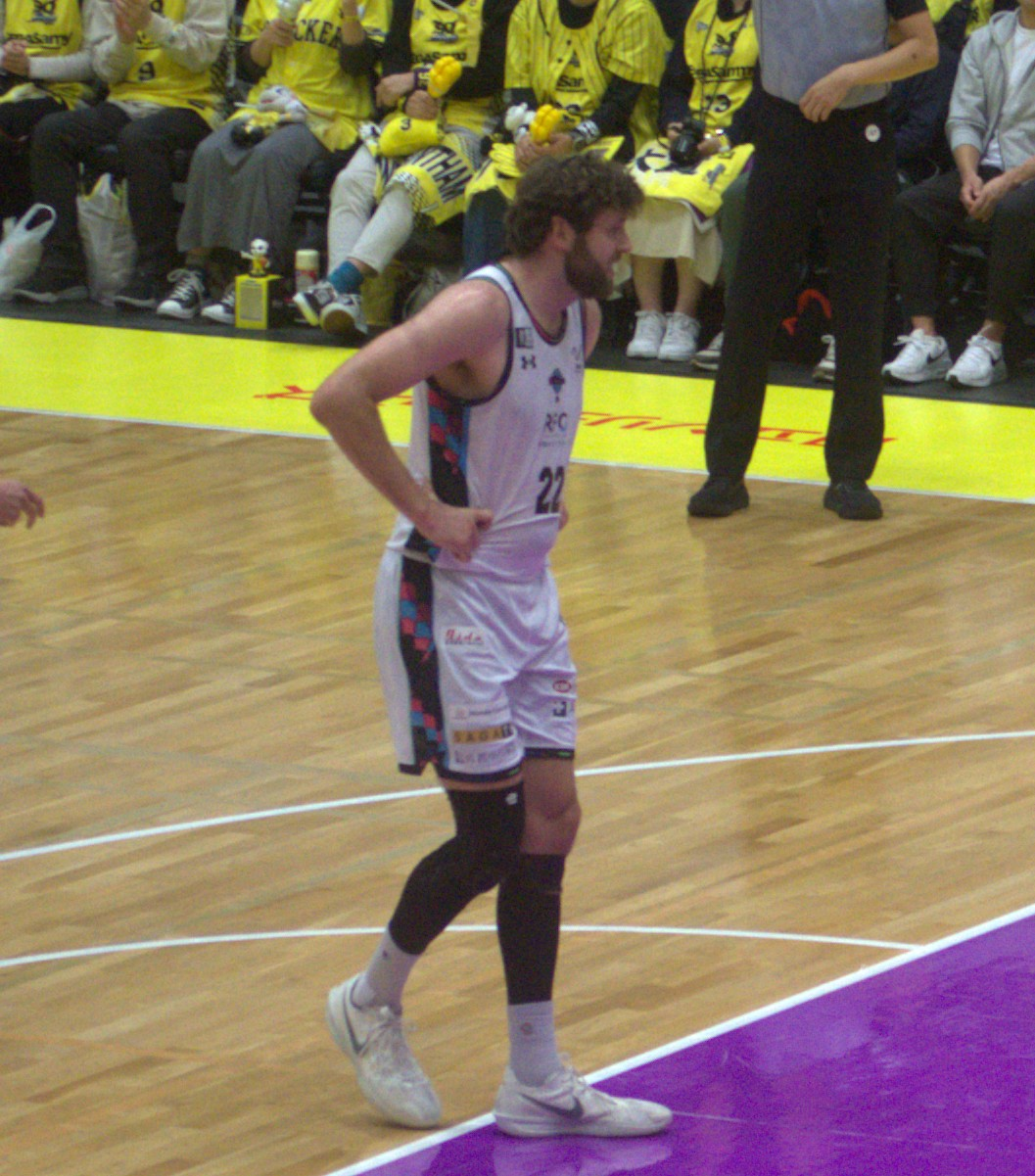

No. 22 – New Taipei Kings
- Position: Power forward / center
- League: Taiwan Professional Basketball League

Personal information
- Born: May 22, 1999 (age 27) Spokane, Washington, U.S.
- Listed height: 208 cm (6 ft 10 in)
- Listed weight: 109 kg (240 lb)

Career information
- High school: Shadle Park (Spokane, Washington)
- College: Eastern Washington (2018–2021); Oklahoma (2021–2023)
- NBA draft: 2023: undrafted
- Playing career: 2023–present

Career history
- 2023–2024: Anwil Włocławek
- 2024: Xinjiang Flying Tigers
- 2024: SC Rasta Vechta
- 2024–2025: Cairns Taipans
- 2025: Nagasaki Velca
- 2025–2026: Saga Ballooners
- 2026–present: New Taipei Kings

Career highlights
- Big Sky Player of the Year (2021); First-team All-Big Sky (2021); Big Sky tournament MVP (2021)

Tanner John Groves (born May 22, 1999) is an American professional basketball player for the New Taipei Kings of the Taiwan Professional Basketball League (TPBL). He played college basketball for the Eastern Washington Eagles and Oklahoma Sooners.

== Early life ==
Groves was born in Spokane, Washington. He attended Shadle Park High School, where he was named All-State and All-Greater Spokane League as a senior after averaging 18.2 points, 9.5 rebounds, and 1.8 blocks per game.

== College career ==
Groves redshirted his true freshman season. He played mostly off the bench as a redshirt freshman and sophomore before becoming a starter as a redshirt junior. He was named the Big Sky Conference Player of the Year for the 2020–21 season after averaging 17.9 points and 7.4 rebounds per game. On April 18, 2021, he transferred to Oklahoma. In 2021–22, he started in all 34 games for the Sooners, averaging 11.6 points, 5.8 rebounds, 1.6 assists per game and shooting over 38 percent from three. In 2022–23, he averaged 10.2 points, 7.2 boards and 1.1 blocks per game, recording the team-high six double-doubles.

== Professional career ==
After going undrafted in the 2023 NBA draft, Groves joined the Oklahoma City Thunder for the 2023 NBA Summer League. He started the 2023–24 season in Poland with Anwil Włocławek, leaving in early January 2024 to join the Xinjiang Flying Tigers in China. In February 2024, he joined German team SC Rasta Vechta.

On May 7, 2024, Groves signed with the Cairns Taipans in Australia for the 2024–25 NBL season.

On February 28, 2025, he signed with the Nagasaki Velca of the Japanese B.League for the rest of the 2024–25 season. On June 15, Groves signed with the Saga Ballooners of the B.League.

On July 26, 2026, Groves signed with the New Taipei Kings of the Taiwan Professional Basketball League (TPBL).

== Career statistics ==
Legend
| GP | Games played | GS | Games started | MPG | Minutes per game |
| FG% | Field goal percentage | 3P% | 3-point field goal percentage | FT% | Free throw percentage |
| RPG | Rebounds per game | APG | Assists per game | SPG | Steals per game |
| BPG | Blocks per game | PPG | Points per game | **Bold** | Career high |

=== College ===
| Year | Team | GP | GS | MPG | FG% | 3P% | FT% | RPG | APG | SPG | BPG | PPG |
|---|---|---|---|---|---|---|---|---|---|---|---|---|
| 2017–18 | Eastern Washington | Redshirt | | | | | | | | | | |
| 2018–19 | Eastern Washington | 28 | 2 | 8.6 | .417 | .385 | .650 | 2.1 | .3 | .1 | .6 | 2.8 |
| 2019–20 | Eastern Washington | 30 | 1 | 9.9 | **.589** | **.424** | .636 | 2.8 | .3 | .1 | .6 | 5.1 |
| 2020–21 | Eastern Washington | 24 | 24 | **27.0** | .560 | .349 | **.778** | **8.0** | 1.3 | .3 | **1.1** | **17.2** |
| 2021–22 | Oklahoma | **34** | **34** | 25.0 | .532 | .381 | .729 | 5.8 | **1.6** | .4 | .4 | 11.6 |
| 2022–23 | Oklahoma | 32 | 32 | 25.4 | .508 | .286 | .724 | 7.2 | 1.4 | **.8** | **1.1** | 10.2 |
| Career | | 148 | 93 | 19.3 | .532 | .353 | .733 | 5.1 | 1.0 | .3 | .7 | 9.2 |
