= Jayden Gardner =

American basketball player (born 2000)

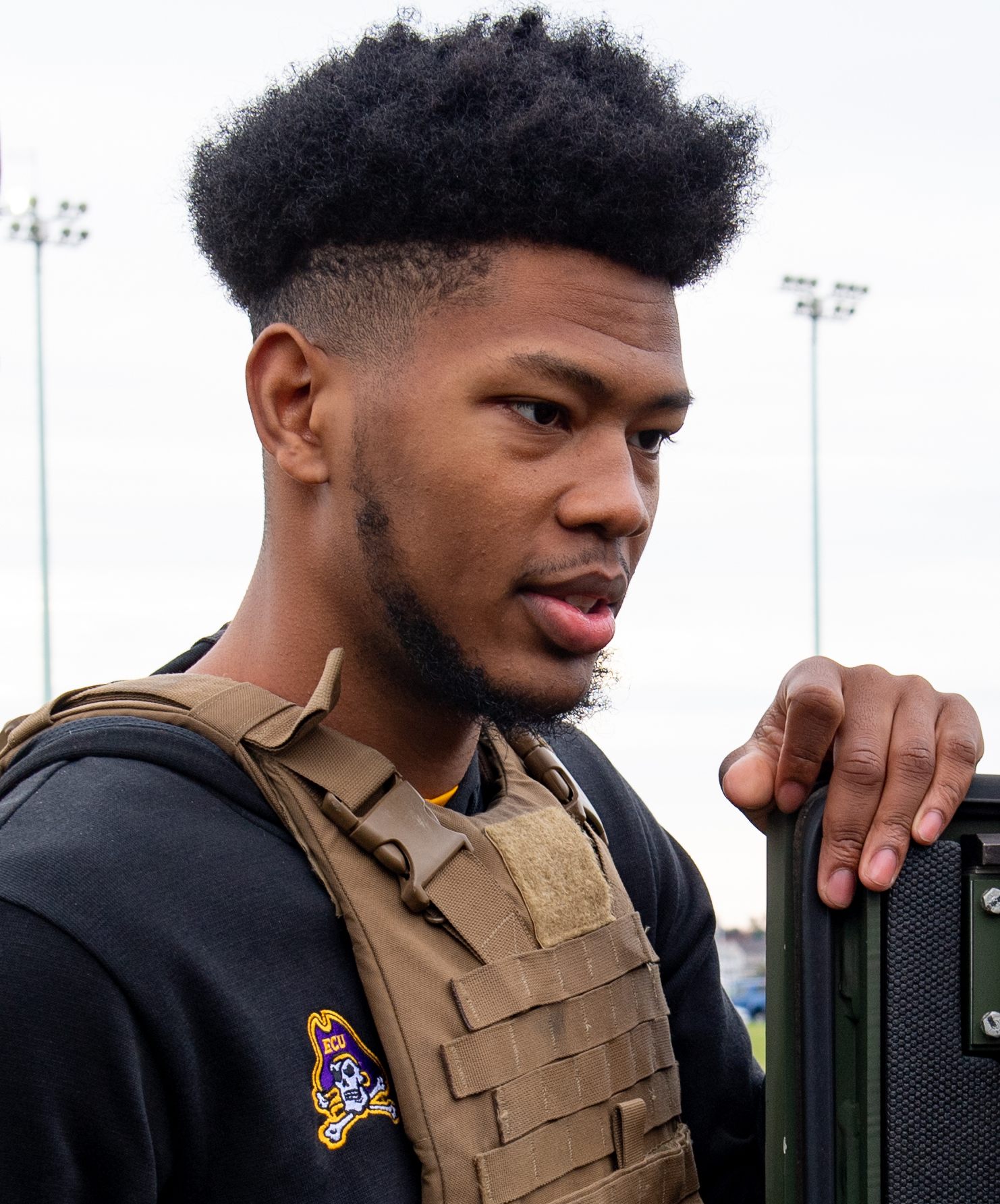
- Gardner in 2019

No. 5 – Veltex Shizuoka
- Position: Power forward
- League: B.League

Personal information
- Born: May 14, 2000 (age 26) Durham, North Carolina, U.S.
- Listed height: 6 ft 7 in (2.01 m)
- Listed weight: 230 lb (104 kg)

Career information
- High school: Heritage (Wake Forest, North Carolina)
- College: East Carolina (2018–2021); Virginia (2021–2023)
- NBA draft: 2023: undrafted
- Playing career: 2023–present

Career history
- 2023–2024: Kortrijk Spurs
- 2024–2025: Rasta Vechta
- 2025–2026: New Taipei Kings
- 2026–present: Veltex Shizuoka

Career highlights
- First Team All-ACC tournament (2023); First-team All-AAC (2021); Second-team All-AAC (2020); Third-team All-ACC (2022); AAC All-Rookie Team (2019)

Jayden David Darrel Gardner (born May 14, 2000) is an American professional basketball player for the Veltex Shizuoka of the B.League. He played college basketball for the Virginia Cavaliers and the East Carolina Pirates.

== High school career ==
Gardner played for Heritage High School in Wake Forest, North Carolina for four years. He averaged 22.9 points and 15.1 rebounds per game as a junior and was named CAP-8 Conference Player of the Year and First Team All-State, leading his team to a 28–2 record. As a senior, Gardner averaged 24.3 points and 13.9 rebounds per game. He led Heritage to the NCHSAA Class 4A state championship game, where he recorded 30 points and 13 rebounds. He was named Northern Athletic Conference Player of the Year and was a First Team All-State selection. Gardner finished high school with the second-most points behind Donald Williams and the most rebounds and free throws made in Wake County history. He was rated a three-star recruit by 247Sports and Rivals and committed to play college basketball for East Carolina over offers from Penn State and VCU, among others.

== College career ==
=== East Carolina ===
In his third game at East Carolina, on November 11, 2018, Gardner recorded 30 points and 10 rebounds in an 84–78 overtime win over Lamar. He became the third freshman in school history to score at least 30 points in a game. On November 21, Gardner posted 28 points and 17 rebounds in a 76–64 victory over Prairie View A&M. Six days later, he tallied 30 points and 15 rebounds in a 95–86 loss to UNC Wilmington, becoming the first-ever American Athletic Conference (AAC) freshman with multiple 30-point games. On January 13, 2019, Gardner posted a career-high 35 points and 20 rebounds in a 76–65 loss to UCF. He became the first East Carolina player since 1966 with a 30-point, 20-rebound game and the first freshman in AAC history to record at least 35 points or 20 rebounds in a game. Two days later, he was named USBWA National Freshman of the Week. As a freshman, Gardner averaged 16.3 points and 8.5 rebounds per game, setting school freshman records for rebounds and free throws and AAC freshman records for points per game and free throws. He led all NCAA Division I freshmen in free throws, with 171, and registered 10 double-doubles. He was a five-time AAC Freshman of the Week and was unanimously selected to the AAC All-Rookie Team.

On November 5, 2019, Gardner made his sophomore season debut, tallying 28 points and 11 rebounds in an 80–68 win over VMI. On January 1, 2020, he recorded a season-high 29 points and 10 rebounds in a 75–69 loss to Wichita State. Gardner scored 29 points again and grabbed a season-high 19 rebounds in a 69–59 loss to Houston on January 29. Gardner became the third-fastest East Carolina player to reach 1,000 career points in a February 12 loss to Tulsa. On February 23, he scored 29 points for his third time during the season, while grabbing 13 rebounds in a 67–63 victory over Temple. As a sophomore, he averaged an AAC-leading 19.7 points, 9.2 rebounds and 2.2 assists per game, posting 13 double-doubles, and was named to the Second Team All-AAC. He averaged the third-most points in school history. As a junior, Gardner averaged 18.3 points and 8.3 rebounds per game, earning First Team All-AAC honors.

=== Virginia ===
On April 12, 2021, Gardner transferred to Virginia for his final two seasons of eligibility, choosing the Cavaliers over offers from Arkansas, LSU, Miami, and NC State, among others. All Division I athletes who played in the 2020–21 season gained an extra year of eligibility. On December 3, he scored 15 points and hit the game-winning putback shot in a 57–56 win against Pittsburgh. Gardner was named to the Third Team All-ACC.

In the Cavaliers’ 2022–23 season opener, Gardner reached the 2,000 career point milestone becoming one of few players ever in D1 to achieve 2,000 points and 1000 rebounds in a career. Gardner helped Virginia capture another ACC regular season championship. Lead the Cavaliers to the ACC championship and got rewarded First Team All ACC Tourbament Team. Leading the Cavaliers to a 4 seed Gardner made his first ncaa tournament appearance. On January 8, 2023 he recorded his 1,000th rebound, joining an exclusive list of Division I players who reached both the 2000-point / 1000-rebound milestones.

== Professional career ==
=== Kortrijk Spurs ===
Gardner signed with the Kortrijk Spurs on July 20, 2023 for the 2023-24 season. Gardner had a very successful rookie year in Belgium averaging 15.3 ppg 6 Rbs 1.1 ass a game shooting 50%fg and 34% from 3pt

=== Rasta Vechta ===
On August 3, 2024, he signed with Rasta Vechta of the Basketball Bundesliga (BBL).

=== New Taipei Kings ===
On August 19, 2025, Gardner signed with New Taipei Kings of the Taiwan Professional Basketball League (TPBL). On March 9, 2026, Gardner was not registered in the 2025–26 TPBL season final rosters. On July 8, the New Taipei Kings announced that the contract with Gardner was expired.

=== Veltex Shizuoka ===
On July 16, 2026, Gardner signed with the Veltex Shizuoka of the B.League.

== Career statistics ==
Legend
GP	Games played	GS	Games started	MPG	Minutes per game
FG%	Field goal percentage	3P%	3-point field goal percentage	FT%	Free throw percentage
RPG	Rebounds per game	APG	Assists per game	SPG	Steals per game
BPG	Blocks per game	PPG	Points per game	**Bold**	Career high

=== College ===
Year	Team	GP	GS	MPG	FG%	3P%	FT%	RPG	APG	SPG	BPG	PPG
2018–19	East Carolina	31	31	30.6	.493	.200	.750	8.5	1.3	.8	**.5**	16.3
2019–20	East Carolina	31	30	34.3	**.521**	.200	.734	**9.2**	**2.2**	**1.1**	**.5**	**19.7**
2020–21	East Carolina	19	18	**35.1**	.479	**.500**	.737	8.3	1.4	.6	.2	18.3
2021–22	Virginia	**35**	**35**	32.7	.501	.214	**.793**	6.4	1.4	.5	.4	15.3
2022–23	Virginia	33	33	26.3	.510	.000	.685	5.8	.7	.9	**.5**	12.0
Career		149	147	31.5	.503	.226	.741	7.5	1.4	.8	.4	16.1

=== Professional ===
Year	Team	GP	GS	MPG	FG%	3P%	FT%	RPG	APG	SPG	BPG	PPG
2023-24	Kortrijk Spurs	25	32	28.1	.50	.34	.64	6	1.1	.6	**.3**	15.3

== See also ==
- List of NCAA Division I men's basketball players with 2,000 points and 1,000 rebounds
