= Sina Vahedi =

Iranian basketball player

Mohammad Sina Vahedi
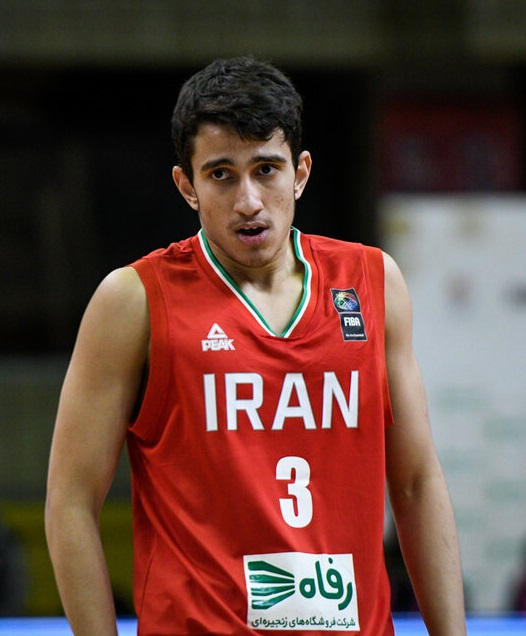

Free Agent
- Position: Guard

Personal information
- Born: 8 January 2001 (age 25) Tehran, Iran
- Listed height: 1.85 m (6 ft 1 in)
- Listed weight: 84 kg (185 lb)

Career information
- Playing career: 2019–present

Career history
- 2019–2020: Mahram Tehran
- 2020–2021: Shahrdari Gorgan
- 2021–2022: Chemidor Tehran
- 2022–2023: Kalleh Mazandaran
- 2023–2024: Tabiat
- 2024–2025: Shahrdari Gorgan
- 2025–2026: Meralco Bolts
- 2026: New Taipei Kings

Career highlights
- BCL Asia All-Tournament Team (2024); FIBA Asia Cup All-Star Selection (2025)
Medals
Men's basketball
Representing Iran
Asian Championship
Bronze medal – third place	2025 Jeddah
Islamic Solidarity Games
Bronze medal – third place	2021 Konya	3x3 basketball

Mohammad Sina Vahedi (Persian: محمدسینا واحدی, born 8 January 2001) is an Iranian basketball player who last played for the New Taipei Kings of the East Asia Super League (EASL). He also plays for the Iranian national team.

On March 5, 2026, Vahedi signed with the New Taipei Kings of the East Asia Super League (EASL). On April 9, Vahedi went back home for recovery.

He represented Iran at the 2020 Summer Olympics.
