= Thomas Wisman =

Australian-American basketball player and coach

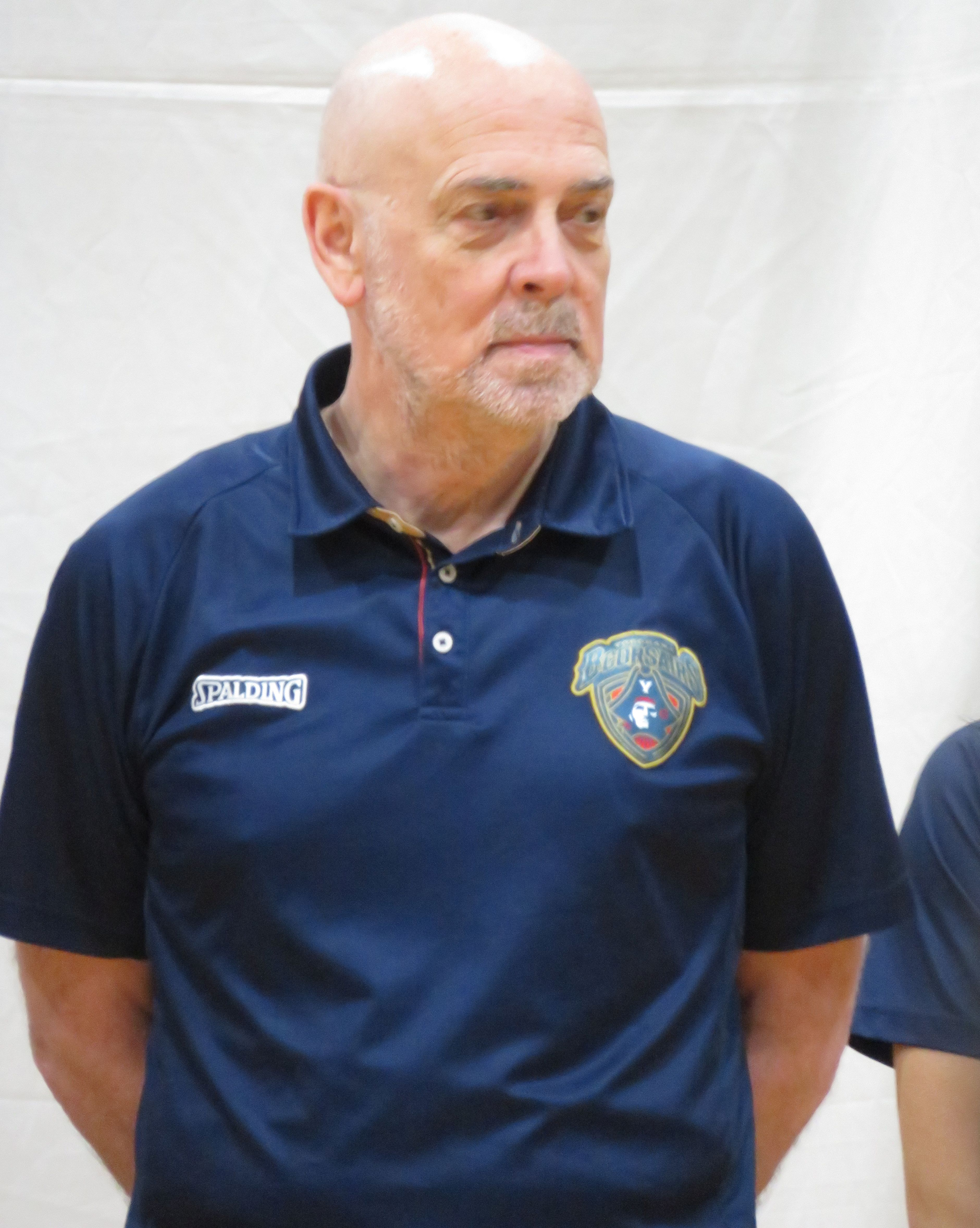
- Wisman in 2019

New Taipei Kings
- Position: Consultant
- League: Taiwan Professional Basketball League

Personal information
- Born: March 28, 1949 (age 77)

Career information
- High school: Christian Brothers (Quincy, Illinois)
- College: Rockhurst; Quincy (1970–1972)
- Coaching career: 1976–present

Career history

Coaching
- 1976–1978: Crystal Palace
- 1980–1982: Solent Stars
- 1988–1989: Isuzu Motors (assistant)
- 1991–1996: Newcastle Falcons
- 1996–1997: Wonju Naray Blue Bird (assistant)
- 1997–2004: Isuzu Motors / Yokohama Giga Cats (assistant)
- 2005–2007: Jomo Sunflowers (assistant)
- 2008–2010, 2014–2017: Link Tochigi Brex
- 2018–2020: Yokohama B-Corsairs
- 2021–2022: Gunma Crane Thunders
- 2024–2026: New Taipei Kings (assistant)
- 2025: New Taipei Kings (interim)
- 2026–present: New Taipei Kings (consultant)

Career highlights
- As coach: TPBL champion (2025); 2× Japanese League champion (2009, 2017); Japanese League Coach of the Year (2017); NBL Coach of the Year (1995)

Thomas Robert Wisman (born March 28, 1949) is an Australian-American professional basketball coach who is the assistant coach for the New Taipei Kings of the Taiwan Professional Basketball League (TPBL). He was head coach of the national teams of England, Hong Kong, Malaysia, Japan and Qatar.

Wisman attended Christian Brothers High School (now Quincy Notre Dame High School) in Quincy, Illinois, and graduated in 1967. He played two seasons at Rockhurst College before he transferred to Quincy College in 1970 where he played until 1972.

He won the 1995 NBL Coach of the Year Award while coaching Newcastle Falcons of the National Basketball League in Australia.

He won the championship of the 2009-10 Japanese Basketball League as head coach of Link Tochigi Brex.

On November 11, 2025, the New Taipei Kings named Hung Chih-Shan as their interim head coach after Thomas Wisman, the assistant coach of the New Taipei Kings, coached as interim head coach for one game.

== Head coaching record ==
Legend
Regular season	G	Games coached	W	Games won	L	Games lost	W–L %	Win–loss %
Playoffs	PG	Playoff games	PW	Playoff wins	PL	Playoff losses	PW–L %	Playoff win–loss %

Team	Year	G	W	L	W–L%	Finish	PG	PW	PL	PW–L%	Result
Link Tochigi Brex	2008-09	25	13	12	.520	5th	-	-	-	–	-
Link Tochigi Brex	2009-10	42	27	15	.643	2nd	6	5	1	.833	JBL Champions
Link Tochigi Brex	2014-15	54	43	11	.796	2nd in Eastern	4	2	2	.500	3rd
Link Tochigi Brex	2015-16	54	43	11	.796	2nd	5	3	2	.600	3rd
Link Tochigi Brex	2016-17	60	46	14	.767	1st in Eastern	6	5	1	.833	Champions
Yokohama B-Corsairs	2018-19	60	14	46	.233	6th in Central	-	-	-	–	-
Yokohama B-Corsairs	2019-20	32	8	24	.250	Fired	-	-	-	–	-
