= John Patrick (basketball) =

American basketball player and coach

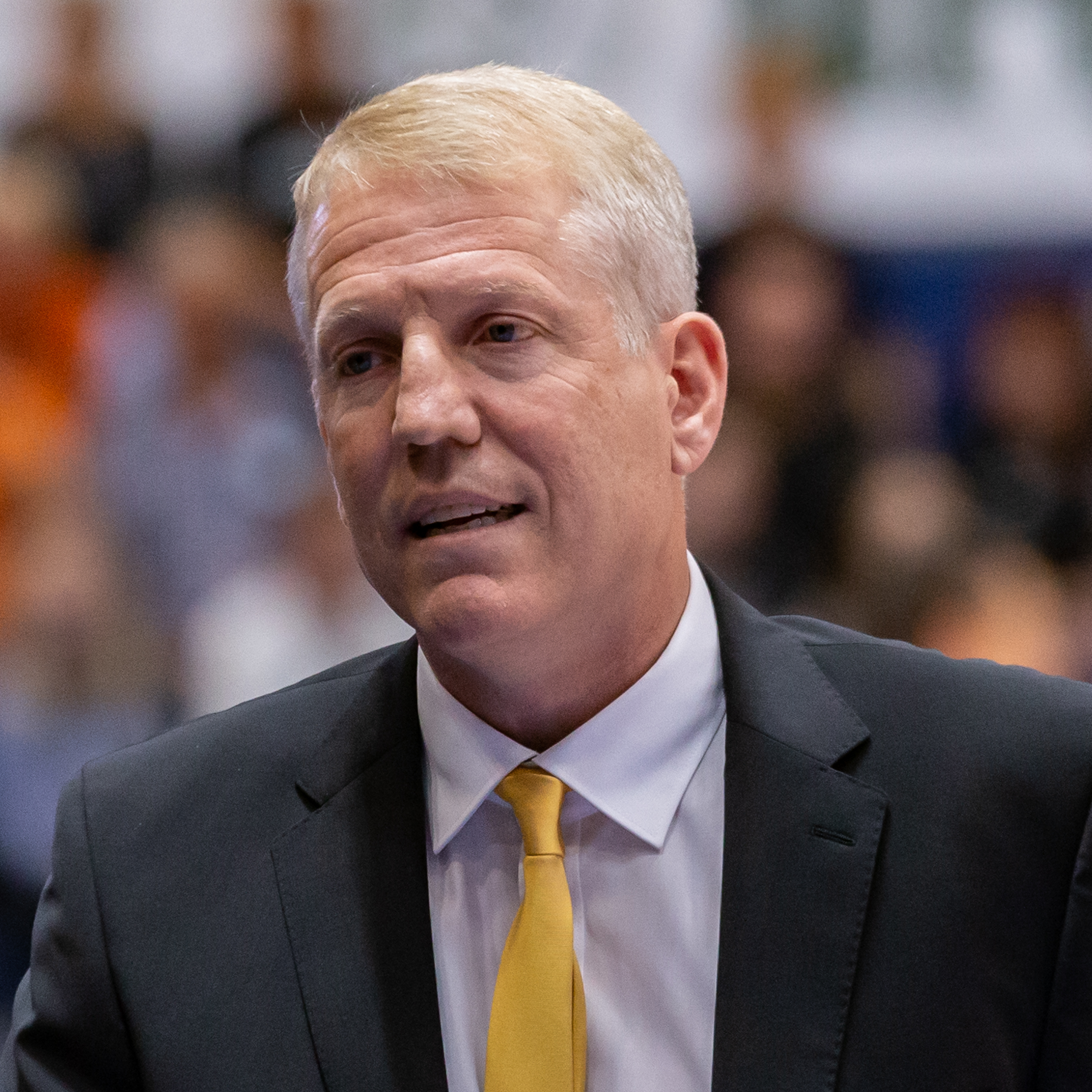
- John Patrick (2019)

Veltex Shizuoka
- League: B.League

Personal information
- Born: February 29, 1968 (age 58)
- Listed height: 6 ft 4 in (1.93 m)

Career information
- High school: Sidwell Friends (Washington, D.C.)
- College: Stanford (1987–1991)
- NBA draft: 1991: undrafted
- Position: Point guard / shooting guard
- Coaching career: 2003–present

Career history

Coaching
- 2003–2005: Göttingen
- 2005–2006: Toyota Alvark
- 2006–2011: Göttingen
- 2011–2012: s.Oliver Baskets
- 2013–2022: Riesen Ludwigsburg
- 2022–2024: Chiba Jets Funabashi
- 2024–2025: Riesen Ludwigsburg
- 2025: New Taipei Kings
- 2026–present: Veltex Shizuoka

Career highlights
- As coach: EASL champion (2024); FIBA EuroChallenge champion (2010); 3× German Bundesliga Coach of the Year (2009, 2010, 2021); Basketball Champions League Best Coach (2018); JBL Super League champion (2006)

John Patrick (born February 29, 1968) is an American professional basketball coach and former professional basketball player. Most recently, he is the head coach of Veltex Shizuoka of the B.League.

== Career ==
Patrick attended DeMatha Catholic High School, where he played under coach Morgan Wootten, before moving to Sidwell Friends School in Washington, D.C. He started his college career at Stanford University in 1987. Playing point guard for coach Mike Montgomery, he won the 1991 NIT Championship as a senior. Patrick led Stanford in assists per game in 1989-90 and 1990–91, while making the Pac-10 All-Academic Team his junior and senior year.

Upon graduation, Patrick had an eight-year career as a professional basketball player, mostly representing clubs in Japan and Germany. He had a tryout with NBA team Golden State Warriors, but never made the roster. While sitting out the 1994–95 season with a knee injury, he served as an assistant coach of his team (Japan Energy Griffins), but later returned to the court and split time between playing and coaching in Japan in the following years.

In 2003, Patrick was appointed head coach of BG Göttingen, a second-division team from Germany. He coached the Violets until 2005 and then spent the 2005–06 season as head coach for Toyota Alvark in Japan. After one year, he returned to Göttingen and guided the team to promotion to Germany's top-flight Basketball Bundesliga in 2007. Counting on a fast-paced style of play, Patrick led the team to three Bundesliga playoff appearances in four years and to the 2010 EuroChallenge title, while earning Bundesliga Coach of the Year honors in 2009 and 2010.

He parted company with BG Göttingen at the conclusion of the 2010–11 season to take the reins as head coach at fellow Bundesliga team s.Oliver Würzburg. Patrick led Würzburg to the playoff semifinals in 2011–12, but parted ways with the club at the end of the season.

In January 2013, Patrick was hired as head coach by struggling MHP Riesen Ludwigsburg, but couldn't prevent them from being relegated from the Bundesliga. However, the Ludwigsburg organization was granted a wildcard to remain in the league. Patrick guided the team to playoff berths in 2014, 2015, 2016, 2017 and 2018. In the 2017–18 season, Patrick's Ludwigsburg team reached the semi-final stage of the Champions League, where they fell short to Monaco. He was presented with the Best Coach award for the 2017-18 Champions League season. In Bundesliga play, Patrick guided Ludwigsburg to a semifinal appearance, where his team lost to Alba Berlin in May 2018. In the 2018-19 season, Patrick's Ludwigsburg side finished the Bundesliga regular season in tenth place, thus missing the playoffs.

In the 2019–20 season, his Ludwigsburg team had a record of 17 wins and 4 losses, while sitting in second place in the German Bundesliga standings, when play was stopped due to the COVID-19 pandemic in March 2020. At the Bundesliga finals tournament which was organized in June 2020, he guided Ludwigsburg to its first ever appearance in the Bundesliga finals, where his team took on Alba Berlin, but lost both games. In these two games, Patrick had to replace Marcos Knight due to injury. Knight was later named Bundesliga finals tournament MVP. During the tournament, Patrick's sons Johannes and Jacob were both players on his Ludwigsburg team.

Patrick guided Ludwigsburg to a 30–4 record in the 2020–21 Bundesliga regular season, entering the playoffs as the top seed. He garnered Bundesliga Coach of the Years honours for the third time that season. In the 2021-22 campaign, Patrick and his Ludwigsburg squad won a bronze medal in the Champions League. In Bundesliga play, Patrick coached Ludwigburg to a semifinal appearance in the 2021-22 season. After nine years as head coach of the MHP Riesen Ludwigsburg in the German Bundesliga, Patrick left the club on June 8, 2022

On July 6, 2022, Patrick was appointed head coach of the Chiba Jets Funabashi. He guided the Chiba Jets to the 2023 B1 League finals where they fell short to the Ryukyu Golden Kings. During the 2022-23 season, Patrick's team set a league record by winning 24 games in a row. In March 2024, Patrick's Chiba Jets captured the East Asia Super League (EASL) title, remaining undefeated throughout the entire EASL season.

Patrick returned to Ludwigsburg in the summer of 2024. In the FIBA Europe Cup, he guided the team to a quarterfinal appearance in the 2024-25 season. He parted ways with Ludwigsburg on March 26, 2025 after a poor run of results (five losses in a row). The team was sitting in 10th place of the Bundesliga standings when Patrick's tenure came to a close.

On July 9, 2025, Patrick was hired as the head coach of the New Taipei Kings of the Taiwan Professional Basketball League (TPBL). On November 11, 2025, the New Taipei Kings announced to have parted ways with Patrick. Under his tutelage the Kings won three of their first seven league games of the 2025-26 season.

On May 4, 2026, Patrick was hired as the head coach of the Veltex Shizuoka of the B.League.

== Head coaching record ==
Legend
Regular season	G	Games coached	W	Games won	L	Games lost	W–L %	Win–loss %
Playoffs	PG	Playoff games	PW	Playoff wins	PL	Playoff losses	PW–L %	Playoff win–loss %

Team	Year	G	W	L	W–L%	Finish	PG	PW	PL	PW–L%	Result
Toyota Alvark	2005-06	26	21	5	.808	1st	7	5	2	.714	JBL Champions
