= Jalen Harris =

American basketball player (born 1998)

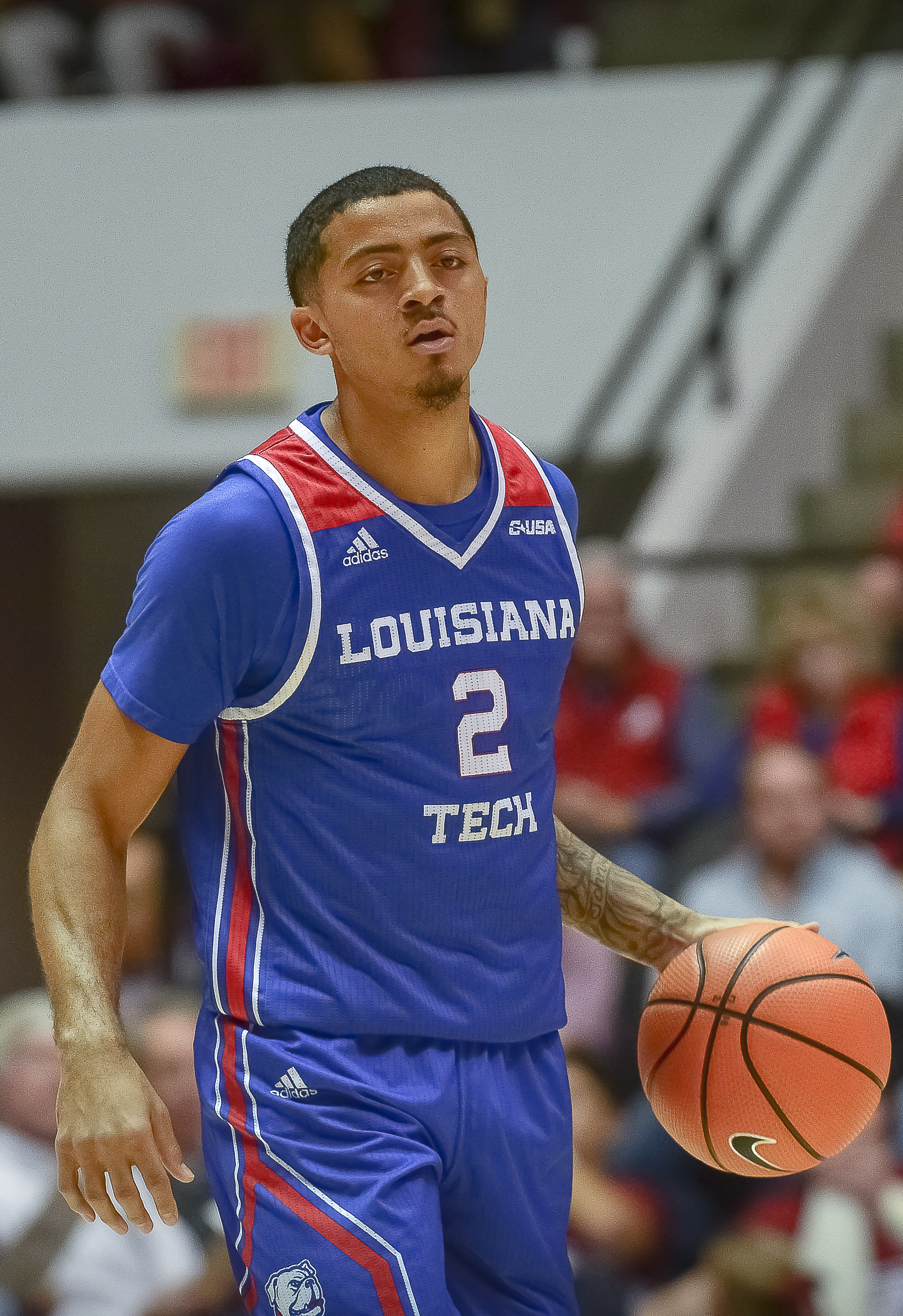
- Harris with Louisiana Tech in 2017

Free Agent
- Position: Shooting guard

Personal information
- Born: August 14, 1998 (age 28) Dallas, Texas, U.S.
- Listed height: 193 cm (6 ft 4 in)
- Listed weight: 88 kg (194 lb)

Career information
- High school: Duncanville (Duncanville, Texas)
- College: Louisiana Tech (2016–2018); Nevada (2019–2020)
- NBA draft: 2020: 2nd round, 59th overall pick
- Drafted by: Toronto Raptors
- Playing career: 2020–present

Career history
- 2020–2021: Toronto Raptors
- 2021: →Raptors 905
- 2021–2022: Vanoli Cremona
- 2022: Scarborough Shooting Stars
- 2022–2023: Westchester Knicks
- 2023: Scarborough Shooting Stars
- 2023–2024: Windy City Bulls
- 2024: Leones de Ponce
- 2024: Saskatchewan Rattlers
- 2024: Jiangxi Ganchi
- 2024–2025: Nanjing Monkey Kings
- 2025: Winnipeg Sea Bears
- 2025–2026: New Taipei Kings

Career highlights
- All-CEBL First Team (2022); All-CEBL Second Team (2024); Conference USA All-Freshman Team (2017); Mountain West Newcomer of the Year (2020); First-team All-Mountain West (2020)
- Stats at NBA.com
- Stats at Basketball Reference

Jalen Cole Harris (born August 14, 1998) is an American-born naturalized Jordanian professional basketball player who last played for the New Taipei Kings of the Taiwan Professional Basketball League (TPBL). He played college basketball for the Louisiana Tech Bulldogs and the Nevada Wolf Pack. Harris was suspended from the National Basketball Association for the 2021–22 season due to a drug violation.

== Early life ==
Harris was born in Dallas, Texas, the son of Karlin Kennedy and Erion Harris, both of whom played basketball at SMU, and has two younger brothers and a sister. His mother gave birth to him at the age of 19 but returned to the floor at SMU for her junior season and graduated as the Mustangs' all-time leader in points, rebounds, blocks and field-goal percentage. Harris grew up in Duncanville and played basketball, football and baseball. He gave up football after an injury in middle school, after which he trained with his father to become a high-level basketball player. His father formed the travel team Dallas Heroes around his son in middle school.

He attended Duncanville High School and grew to 6 feet 3 inches (1.91 m) as a sophomore. As a junior, he averaged 15 points, 4 rebounds and 2 assists per game and was named the District 8-6A Offensive Player of the Year. He suffered a broken vertebrae during an AAU event, forcing him to miss half of his senior season. Nevertheless, Harris was again named District 8-6A Offensive Player of the Year as a senior. He averaged 23 points, 7 rebounds, 4 assists and 2 steals per game as a senior and shot 55 percent from the field and 45 percent on three-point attempts. In a game against Cedar Hill High School, Harris scored a career-high 44 points. He was rated as the 16th-best player and the ninth-best guard in Texas in his class by Rivals. Harris spurned offers from Indiana and Kansas State to sign with Louisiana Tech.

== College career ==
Harris began his collegiate career at Louisiana Tech. As a true freshman, he averaged 10.9 points and 3.1 rebounds per game and was named to the Conference USA All-Freshman team. As a sophomore, Harris led the Bulldogs in scoring with 15.3 points per game while also averaging 4.4 rebounds, 2.4 assists and 1.1 steals per game, shooting 44.4 percent from behind the arc. He decided to transfer after 11 games. In January 2018, he signed with Nevada over offers from Oklahoma State, Tulsa and Stephen F. Austin. Harris chose the Wolf Pack after attending a game against Boise State after being impressed by coach Eric Musselman and welcoming fans and sat out the 2018–19 season as a redshirt, during which Nevada finished 29–5.

After his redshirt season, coach Musselman left for Arkansas, and Harris entered the transfer portal again the day before the school hired Steve Alford. Despite receiving interest from Gonzaga and SMU, Harris decided to stay at Nevada. He missed his second game with his new team with a foot injury and struggled in a game against USC, finishing 3-of-19 with nine points. During an eight-game stretch in January 2020, Harris averaged 27 points, 5.4 rebounds and 4.4 assists per game. On February 11, he was named Oscar Robertson National Player of the Week by the U.S. Basketball Writers Association after scoring a career-high 38 points against Air Force and 32 points against San Diego State. He had 29 points, a career-high 14 rebounds, five assists and two steals in an 82–79 overtime win against UNLV on February 12, becoming the 11th Nevada player to tally at least 20 points, 10 rebounds and five assists in a game. Harris is the first Nevada player since Nick Fazekas in 2006 to have four or more 30-point games in a season. At the conclusion of the regular season, Harris was named to the First Team All-Mountain West Conference and conference newcomer of the year. He averaged 21.7 points and 6.5 rebounds per game. Following the season, Harris declared for the 2020 NBA draft.

== Professional career ==
=== Toronto Raptors (2020–2021) ===
On November 18, 2020, Harris was drafted in the second round, 59th overall, in the 2020 NBA draft by the Toronto Raptors. On January 29, 2021, Harris was assigned to the Raptors 905 of the NBA G League. On May 14, Harris scored a career-high 31 points against the Dallas Mavericks in his hometown of Dallas. On July 1, Harris was dismissed and suspended from the NBA for violating terms of the NBA/NBPA (National Basketball Players Association) anti-drug program. Harris was banned for the 2021–22 season. He was the first since Tyreke Evans in 2019 to be banned under the policy.

=== Vanoli Cremona (2021–2022) ===
Harris signed with Vanoli Cremona of the Lega Basket Serie A on August 14, 2021.

=== Scarborough Shooting Stars (2022) ===
On May 24, 2022, Harris signed with the Scarborough Shooting Stars of the Canadian Elite Basketball League (CEBL). In his first game with Scarborough, Harris recorded 18 points, 4 rebounds and 4 assists, shooting 40 percent from the field (6-of-15), in an 80–70 loss against the Montreal Alliance.

=== Westchester Knicks (2022–2023) ===
On September 25, 2022, Harris secured a contract with the New York Knicks of the NBA, officially ending his season-long ban in the process, but was waived at the end of training camp. On October 24, 2022, Harris joined the Knicks' G League affiliate Westchester Knicks' training camp roster.

=== Return to Scarborough (2023) ===
On April 17, 2023, Harris re-signed with the Scarborough Shooting Stars. However, he was waived on July 19.

=== Windy City Bulls (2023–2024) ===
On November 2, 2023, Harris joined the Windy City Bulls where he averaged 12.3 points, 3.1 rebounds and 2.5 assists in 23.7 minutes per game.

=== Leones de Ponce (2024) ===
On April 3, 2024, Harris signed with the Leones de Ponce of the Baloncesto Superior Nacional.

=== Saskatchewan Rattlers (2024) ===
On May 9, 2024, Harris signed with the Saskatchewan Rattlers of the Canadian Elite Basketball League. On June 12, 2024, Harris scored 45 points in a 104-93 win over the Hamilton Honey Badgers which was a CEBL record at the time. Harris made 6 of 9 from 3 point range including the game winner in target score time.

=== China (2024–2025) ===
Harris joined the Jiangxi Ganchi of the National Basketball League for 2024 season, he averaged 27.5 points, 4.9 rebounds, 2.5 assists per game.

On December 2, 2024, Harris signed with the Nanjing Monkey Kings of the Chinese Basketball Association.

=== New Taipei Kings (2025–2026) ===
On November 25, 2025, Harris signed with the New Taipei Kings of the Taiwan Professional Basketball League (TPBL).

== Career statistics ==
Legend
GP	Games played	GS	Games started	MPG	Minutes per game
FG%	Field goal percentage	3P%	3-point field goal percentage	FT%	Free throw percentage
RPG	Rebounds per game	APG	Assists per game	SPG	Steals per game
BPG	Blocks per game	PPG	Points per game	**Bold**	Career high

=== NBA ===
==== Regular season ====
Year	Team	GP	GS	MPG	FG%	3P%	FT%	RPG	APG	SPG	BPG	PPG
2020–21	Toronto	13	2	13.2	.500	.472	.778	1.4	1.3	.6	.0	7.4
Career		13	2	13.2	.500	.472	.778	1.4	1.3	.6	.0	7.4

=== College ===
Year	Team	GP	GS	MPG	FG%	3P%	FT%	RPG	APG	SPG	BPG	PPG
2016–17	Louisiana Tech	27	2	22.9	.447	.319	**.883**	3.1	1.6	.8	**.3**	10.9
2017–18	Louisiana Tech	11	11	25.1	**.478**	**.444**	.830	4.4	2.4	**1.1**	**.3**	15.3
2018–19	Nevada	Redshirt										
2019–20	Nevada	**30**	**30**	**33.0**	.446	.362	.823	**6.5**	**3.9**	**1.1**	.1	**21.7**
Career		68	43	27.7	.451	.359	.838	4.8	2.7	1.0	.2	16.4

== See also ==
- List of people banned or suspended by the NBA
