= New Taipei Kings =

Professional basketball team in Taiwan

- 2026–27 New Taipei Kings season
- Leagues: Taiwan Professional Basketball League
- Founded: 2021
- History: New Taipei Kings; 2021–2024 (PLG); 2024–present (TPBL)
- Arena: Xinzhuang Gymnasium
- Capacity: 6,800
- Location: New Taipei City, Taiwan
- Team colors: Yellow, black, white
- CEO: Phil Chen
- President: Walter Wang
- General manager: James Mao
- Head coach: Hung Chih-Shan
- Ownership: Kings Blessed Investment
- Championships: 2 PLG: 1 (2024); TPBL: 1 (2025)
- Retired numbers: 1 (7)
- Website: kings.tpbl.basketball

New Taipei Kings (Chinese: 新北國王) are a Taiwanese professional basketball team based in New Taipei City. They have competed in the Taiwan Professional Basketball League (TPBL) and play their home games at the Xinzhuang Gymnasium. The Kings joined the P. League+ since the 2021–22 season, and became one of the seven teams of the inaugural TPBL season. The Kings had also participated in the East Asia Super League (EASL) since the 2023–24 season and Basketball Champions League Asia (BCL Asia) since 2025.

== Franchise history ==
On July 9, 2024, the New Taipei Kings announced to join the Taiwan Professional Basketball League (TPBL).

On January 22, 2025, the New Taipei Kings were invited to participate in 2025 Basketball Champions League Asia – East. On June 29, the New Taipei Kings defeated the Kaohsiung Aquas, 4–3, winning the 2024–25 season championship. On July 24, the New Taipei Kings were invited to participate in 2025–26 East Asia Super League.

On February 18, 2026, the New Taipei Kings were invited to participate in 2026 Basketball Champions League Asia – East.

== Facilities ==
=== Home arenas ===
Arena	Location	Duration
Taipei Heping Basketball Gymnasium	Taipei City	2026
University of Taipei, Tian-Mu Campus Gymnasium	Taipei City	2025; 2026
Xinzhuang Gymnasium	New Taipei City	2021–present

=== Training facilities ===
The Kings' training facility is located at the Xinzhuang Gymnasium. The Kings used to practice at the HTC headquarters sports court.

== Current roster ==
New Taipei Kings roster
Players
Coaches

Pos.	No.	Nat.	Name	Ht.	Wt.	Age	From
G	1	(United States) (Taiwan)	Joseph Lin	1.82 m (6 ft 0 in)	69 kg (152 lb)	34 – 21 June 1992	Hamilton
F	2	(United States)	Kendall Lewis (I)	2.03 m (6 ft 8 in)	95 kg (209 lb)	25 – 19 April 2001	Illinois State
G	3	(United States)	Craig Sword (I)	1.91 m (6 ft 3 in)	89 kg (196 lb)	32 – 16 January 1994	Mississippi State
G	5	(Taiwan)	Pan Wei-Jie	1.80 m (5 ft 11 in)	82 kg (181 lb)	22 – 28 February 2004	UCH
G/F	6	(Taiwan)	Chou Yi-Hsiang	1.91 m (6 ft 3 in)	101 kg (223 lb)	35 – 4 February 1991	Salt Lake CC
G	8	(Taiwan)	Lin Yan-Ting	1.85 m (6 ft 1 in)	85 kg (187 lb)	26 – 22 October 2000	NCCU
G	9	(Taiwan)	Lee Kai-Yan	1.82 m (6 ft 0 in)	80 kg (176 lb)	33 – 6 May 1993	HWU
G	10	(Taiwan)	Chien You-Che	1.80 m (5 ft 11 in)	80 kg (176 lb)	31 – 10 September 1995	UCH
C	11	(Taiwan)	Wang Po-Chih	1.97 m (6 ft 6 in)	130 kg (287 lb)	30 – 29 October 1996	NTSU
F	17	(Taiwan)	Su Shih-Hsuan (C)	1.97 m (6 ft 6 in)	95 kg (209 lb)	30 – 9 April 1996	NTNU
F	20	(United States) (Taiwan)	Ryder Hsiung	1.92 m (6 ft 4 in)	76 kg (168 lb)	23 – 14 April 2003	Willamette
PF/C	22	(United States)	Tanner Groves (I)	2.08 m (6 ft 10 in)	109 kg (240 lb)	27 – 22 May 1999	Oklahoma
F	26	(Taiwan)	Jonathan Smith	1.87 m (6 ft 2 in)	87 kg (192 lb)	23 – 9 May 2003	NTUA
G	29	(Taiwan)	Chuang Chao-Sheng	1.76 m (5 ft 9 in)	74 kg (163 lb)	23 – 9 February 2003	NCCU
F	31	(Taiwan)	Hsiao Shun-Yi	1.93 m (6 ft 4 in)	86 kg (190 lb)	34 – 23 October 1992	NTUA
C	40	(United States)	Thomas Welsh (injured) (I)	2.13 m (7 ft 0 in)	111 kg (245 lb)	30 – 3 February 1996	UCLA
C	42	(United States) (Bulgaria)	Jason Washburn (I)	2.13 m (7 ft 0 in)	111 kg (245 lb)	36 – 5 June 1990	Utah

Head coach

- (Taiwan) Hung Chih-Shan

Assistant coach(es)

- (United States) Erik Olson
- (Taiwan) Wei Wei
- (Lebanon) Nabil Kabalan
- (Taiwan) Lee Wei-En

Strength & conditioning coach(es)

- (Taiwan) Chang Chung-Hsi
- (Taiwan) Chao Te

Athletic trainer(s)

- (Taiwan) Chiu Po-Kai
- (Taiwan) Wu Chung-Hao

Team manager

- (Taiwan) James Mao

Legend

- (C) Team captain
- (I) Import player
- Injured

- Roster
- Transactions
Updated: November 15, 2026

== Season-by-season record ==
Season	League	Coach	Regular season				Postseason	Asian competition					
Season	League	Coach	Won	Lost	Win %	Finish	Postseason	League	Won	Lost	Win %	Finish	Result
2021–22	PLG	Ryan Marchand	16	14	.533	4th	Lost playoffs (Lioneers) 2–3	Did not participate					
2022–23	PLG	Ryan Marchand	27	13	.675	1st	Won playoffs (Dreamers) 3–1; Lost finals (Braves) 2–4	Did not participate					
2023–24	PLG	Ryan Marchand	22	18	.550	3rd	Won playoffs (Dreamers) 4–2; Won finals (Pilots) 4–1	EASL	4	2	.667	Group B 2nd	Lost semifinals (Jets) 84–92; Lost third place game (Red Boosters) 76–78
2024–25	TPBL	Ryan Marchand	26	10	.722	1st	Won semifinals (Mars) 4–0; Won finals (Aquas) 4–3	EASL	4	2	.667	Group B 2nd	Lost semifinals (Dragonflies) 65–81; Won third place game (Golden Kings) 84–80
2024–25	TPBL	Ryan Marchand	26	10	.722	1st	Won semifinals (Mars) 4–0; Won finals (Aquas) 4–3	BCL Asia – East	4	2	.667	Group B 2nd	Lost semifinals (Pilots) 62–81; Lost third place game (Pelita Jaya) 74–103
2025–26	TPBL	John Patrick	19	17	.528	5th	Won play-in (DEA) 2–1; Won semifinals (Leopards) 3–1; Lost finals (Dreamers) 3–4	EASL	3	3	.500	Group C 2nd	Lost quarterfinals (Brex) 64–85
2025–26	TPBL	Thomas Wisman	19	17	.528	5th	Won play-in (DEA) 2–1; Won semifinals (Leopards) 3–1; Lost finals (Dreamers) 3–4	BCL Asia – East	2	4	.333	Group B 4th	Did not qualify
2025–26	TPBL	Hung Chih-Shan	19	17	.528	5th	Won play-in (DEA) 2–1; Won semifinals (Leopards) 3–1; Lost finals (Dreamers) 3–4	—N/a					
2026–27	TPBL	Hung Chih-Shan	3	2	.600			Did not participate					
Totals			113	74	.604	–	5 Playoff appearances	–	17	13	.567	–	4 Playoff appearances

== Retired numbers ==
New Taipei Kings retired numbers
No.	Player	Position	Tenure	Ceremony date
7	Jeremy Lin	G	2023–2025	December 28, 2025

== Notable players ==
Local players

- (Taiwan) Chien You-Che (簡祐哲) – Chinese Taipei national team player
- (Taiwan) Chou Yi-Hsiang (周儀翔) – Chinese Taipei national team player, SBL MVP (2016, 2017)
- (Taiwan) Quincy Davis (戴維斯) – Chinese Taipei national team player, SBL Finals MVP (2018), SBL MVP (2012)
- (Taiwan) Hung Chih-Shan (洪至善) – Chinese Taipei national team player
- (Taiwan) Lee Kai-Yan (李愷諺) – Chinese Taipei national team player, PLG Finals MVP (2024)
- (Taiwan) Lin Chin-Pang (林金榜) – Chinese Taipei national team player
- (Taiwan) (United States) Joseph Lin (林書緯) – Chinese Taipei national team player
- (Taiwan) Lin Yan-Ting (林彥廷) – Chinese Taipei national team player
- (Taiwan) Lu Cheng-Ju (呂政儒) – Chinese Taipei national team player, SBL MVP (2018)
- (Taiwan) Su Shih-Hsuan (蘇士軒) – Chinese Taipei national team player
- (Taiwan) Yang Chin-Min (楊敬敏) – Chinese Taipei national team player, SBL Finals MVP (2011), PLG MVP (2022, 2023)

Heritage players

- (United States) (Taiwan) Jeremy Lin (林書豪) – NBA player, TPBL MVP (2025), TPBL Finals MVP (2025)

Asian import players

- Sani Sakakini – Palestine national team player
- Sina Vahedi – Iran national team player

BCL Asia players

- (United States) Michael Efevberha – Nigeria national team player

Import players

- (United States) Chaundee Brown – NBA player
- (United States) Austin Daye – NBA player
- (United States) Jalen Harris – NBA player, Jordan national team player
- (United States) Chris Johnson – NBA player, PLG Finals MVP (2023)
- (United States) DeAndre Liggins – NBA player
- (United States) Chris McCullough – NBA player
- (United States) (Mexico) Tony Mitchell – NBA player
- (United States) (United Kingdom) Byron Mullens – NBA player
- Craig Sword – NBA player, United States national team player
- (United States) Jason Washburn – Bulgaria national team player
- (United States) Thomas Welsh – NBA player
