= Joseph Lin (basketball) =

Taiwanese-American professional basketball player

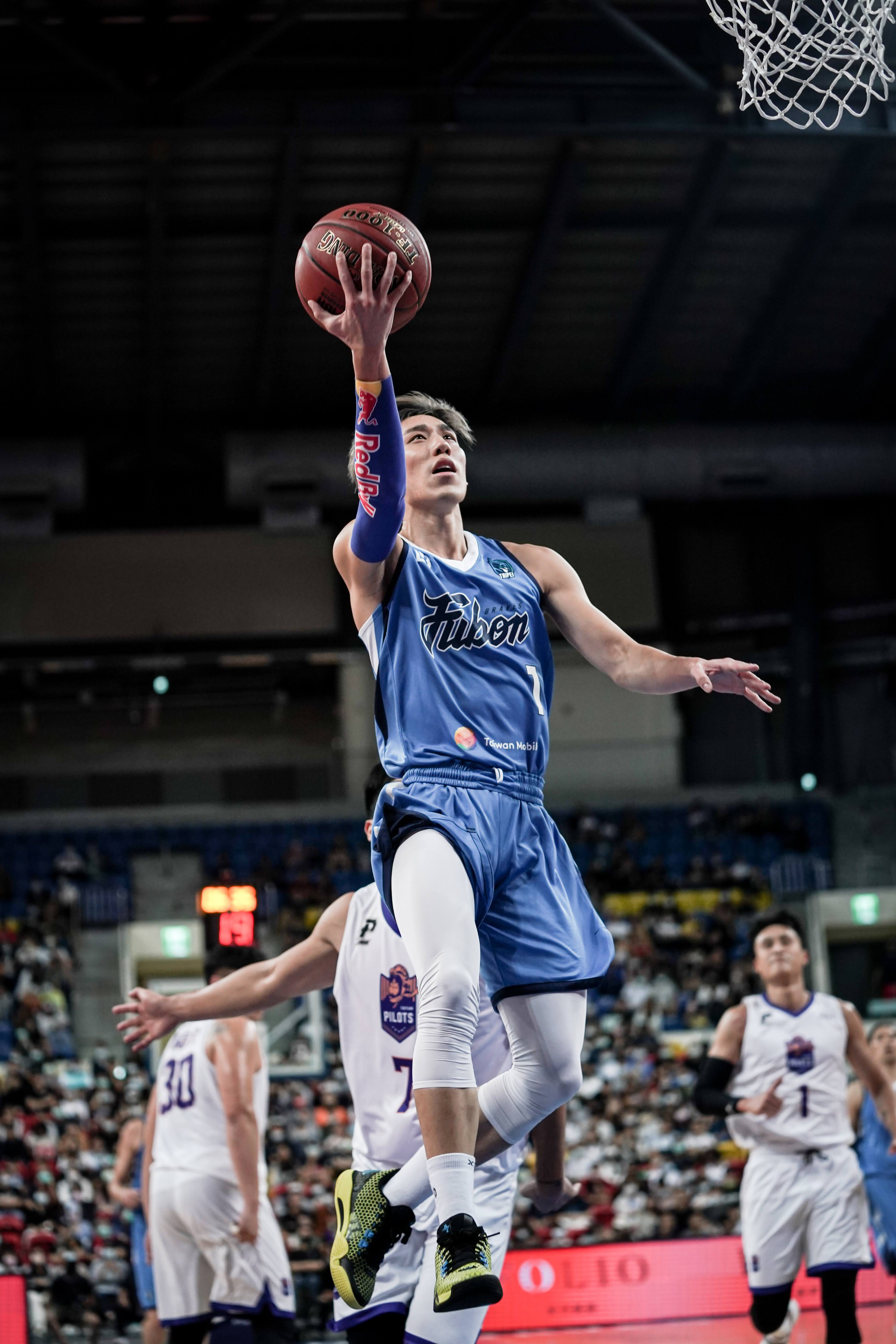

No. 1 – New Taipei Kings
- Position: Point guard
- League: Taiwan Professional Basketball League

Personal information
- Born: June 21, 1992 (age 34) Palo Alto, California, U.S.
- Listed height: 182 cm (6 ft 0 in)
- Listed weight: 69 kg (152 lb)

Career information
- High school: Palo Alto (Palo Alto, California)
- College: Hamilton College (2011-2015)
- NBA draft: 2015: undrafted
- Playing career: 2015–present

Career history
- 2015–2022: Taipei Fubon Braves
- 2022–present: New Taipei Kings

Career highlights
- TPBL champion (2025); 3× P. League+ champion (2021, 2022, 2024); P. League+ First Team (2023); All-TPBL Second Team (2025); P. League+ Second Team (2024); P. League+ Best Dressed of the Year (2023, 2024); P. League+ assist leader (2024); SBL champion (2019); 4× SBL All-Star (2016–2019); SBL First Team (2016); SBL Rookie of the Year (2016); Second-team All-NESCAC (2015)

Joseph Lin
- Traditional Chinese: 林書緯
- Simplified Chinese: 林书纬
Transcriptions
Standard Mandarin
- Hanyu Pinyin: Lín Shūwěi

Joseph Shu-Wei Lin (born June 21, 1992) is a Taiwanese-American professional basketball player who plays for the New Taipei Kings of the Taiwan Professional Basketball League (TPBL).

== Early life ==
Joseph Shu-Wei Lin was born in Palo Alto, California, to Gie-ming Lin and Shirley Lin (née Xinxin Wu) on June 21, 1992.

After graduating from Palo Alto High School, Lin did postgraduate year at the Berkshire School in Massachusetts.

His brother Jeremy Lin is also a professional basketball player.

== College career ==
Lin attended Hamilton College and played as a point guard on the Division III team. He was a respectable rotation guard that made the All-Conference Second Team in his senior year.

== Professional career ==
=== Taipei Fubon Braves (2015–2022) ===
Lin then signed with Taiwan's Taipei Fubon Braves in 2015, for the 2015 SBL season. He was named the SBL 2015-2016 Rookie of the Year, becoming the first rookie ever to be named to the All-SBL first team. He averaged 12.1 points, 4.1 rebounds and 4.4 assists per game.

In the 2018–2019 season, Lin won his first ever SBL Championship. Lin was second in scoring among local players (13.4 points per game) and fourth in assists (4.9 assists per game) during the regular season. He went on to average 14.3 points, 2.8 rebounds, and 5.3 assists in the finals.

Upon the unveiling of the Braves as the tenth team to join the ABL in the 2019–2020 season, Lin expressed his excitement to join the league.

In a heartfelt Instagram post on August 7,2022, Lin expressed his gratitude for the opportunity given to him by the Taipei Fubon Braves. Lin stated that he would not return for an 8th season.

=== New Taipei Kings (2022–present) ===
On August 8, 2022, Lin was traded to the New Taipei Kings.

On June 6, 2025, Lin was selected to the All-TPBL Second Team in 2024–25 season. On June 15, Lin acquired the FIBA local player eligibility. On August 6, Lin re-signed with the New Taipei Kings of the Taiwan Professional Basketball League (TPBL) on a three-year contract.

== Career statistics ==
Legend
GP	Games played	MPG	Minutes per game	FG%	Field goal percentage
3P%	3-point field goal percentage	FT%	Free throw percentage	RPG	Rebounds per game
APG	Assists per game	SPG	Steals per game	BPG	Blocks per game
PPG	Points per game	**Bold**	Career high		Led the league

=== SBL ===
==== Regular season ====
Year	Team	GP	MPG	FG%	3P%	FT%	RPG	APG	SPG	BPG	PPG
2015–16	Taipei Fubon Braves	**30**	**30.5**	44.6%	27.7%	74.7%	**4.1**	4.4	1.4	0.3	12.1
2016–17	Taipei Fubon Braves	**30**	27.4	38.2%	**39.3%**	72.3%	2.9	3.8	**1.6**	0.2	10.6
2017–18	Taipei Fubon Braves	**30**	20.7	**48.8%**	27.1%	74.0%	2.1	2.8	1.1	**0.4**	9.9
2018–19	Taipei Fubon Braves	28	26.1	47.9%	37.7%	**75.0%**	2.9	**4.9**	**1.6**	**0.4**	**13.4**

==== Playoffs ====
Year	Team	GP	MPG	FG%	3P%	FT%	RPG	APG	SPG	BPG	PPG
2015–16	Taipei Fubon Braves	9	**33.2**	43.6%	19.0%	68.7%	**4.2**	**6.6**	1.0	0.4	10.1
2016–17	Taipei Fubon Braves	3	25.9	**52.4%**	33.3%	**91.7%**	1.7	5.0	1.3	0.3	15.0
2017–18	Taipei Fubon Braves	**13**	27.2	44.0%	31.9%	75.0%	3.3	4.0	**1.9**	**0.7**	13.9
2018–19	Taipei Fubon Braves	10	28.5	52.3%	**37.9%**	72.4%	2.7	5.4	1.5	0.4	**15.5**

=== ABL ===
==== Regular season ====
Year	Team	GP	MPG	FG%	3P%	FT%	RPG	APG	SPG	BPG	PPG
2019–20	Taipei Fubon Braves	13	24.7	51.8%	29.6%	50%	2.9	3.2	1.5	0	8.5

=== P. LEAGUE+ ===
==== Regular season ====
Year	Team	GP	MPG	FG%	3P%	FT%	RPG	APG	SPG	BPG	PPG
2020–21	Taipei Fubon Braves	17	23:15	46.88%	**34.88%**	50%	3.35	3.59	**1.47**	0.18	9.35
2021–22	Taipei Fubon Braves	23	28:54	**53.79%**	30.77%	**64.71%**	2.96	3.91	1.3	0.39	11.83
2022–23	New Taipei Kings	**36**	**31:43**	43.96%	31.7%	62.5%	**3.58**	**5.14**	**1.47**	**0.47**	**11.94**
2023–24	New Taipei Kings	**34**	33:11	44.81%	25.26%	70.59%	**4.06**	**6.74**	**1.38**	**0.65**	12.76

==== Playoffs ====
Year	Team	GP	MPG	FG%	3P%	FT%	RPG	APG	SPG	BPG	PPG
2020–21	Taipei Fubon Braves	**4**	17:24	**50%**	16.67%	66.67%	2.5	**4.25**	0.25	**0.25**	4.75
2021–22	Taipei Fubon Braves	**4**	**25:16**	28.57%	**28.57%**	**80%**	**5**	2.75	**1.5**	**0.25**	**8.5**
2023–24	New Taipei Kings	**6**	**31.07**	25.81%	**29.71%**	**40%**	**3.67**	5.33	**0.83**	**0.17**	**6.50**

Finals

Year	Team	GP	MPG	FG%	3P%	FT%	RPG	APG	SPG	BPG	PPG
2023–24	New Taipei Kings	**5**	30:09	**31.58%**	34.48%	80.00%	1.2	**5.00**	1.60	**0.60**	9.20

== Personal life ==
Lin has two older brothers, Jeremy and Joshua. Jeremy Lin, a former NBA player, later played together with him for the New Taipei Kings. Dr. Joshua Lin studied dentistry at New York University.

Lin acquired a Taiwan passport in July 2020.
