= Jason Washburn =

American-Bulgarian basketball player

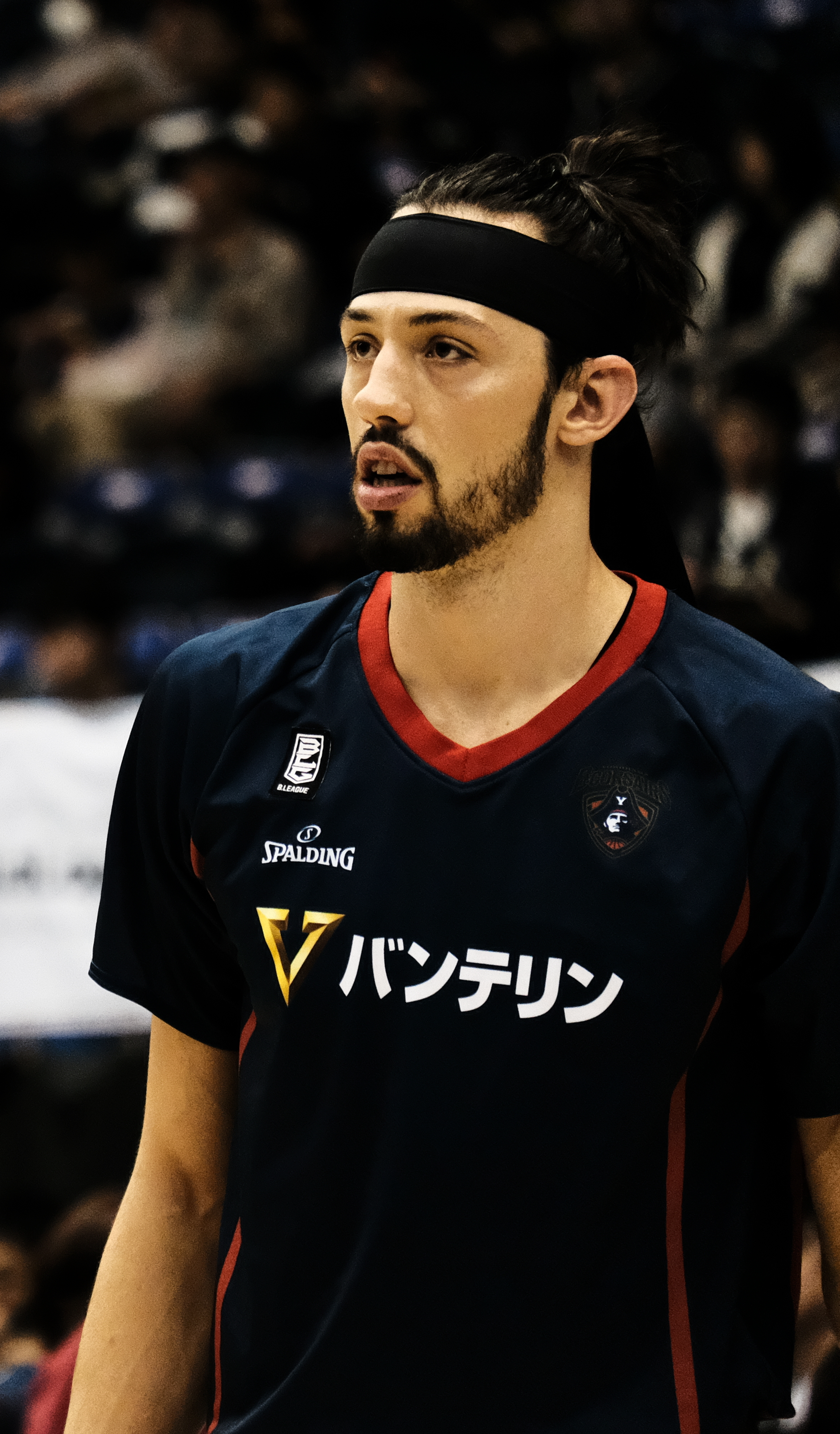
- Washburn with Yokohama B-Corsairs

No. 42 – New Taipei Kings
- Position: Center
- League: Taiwan Professional Basketball League

Personal information
- Born: June 5, 1990 (age 36)
- Listed height: 7 ft 0 in (2.13 m)
- Listed weight: 245 lb (111 kg)

Career information
- High school: Battle Creek Central (Battle Creek, Michigan)
- College: Utah (2009–2013)
- NBA draft: 2013: undrafted
- Playing career: 2013–present

Career history
- 2013–2014: Cherkaski Mavpy
- 2014: Tsmoki-Minsk
- 2014–2015: Basic-Fit Brussels
- 2015–2016: Sigal Prishtina
- 2016–2017: Yokohama B-Corsairs
- 2018–2019: U-BT Cluj-Napoca
- 2019: Yokohama B-Corsairs
- 2020: Ryukyu Golden Kings
- 2020–2021: Niigata Albirex
- 2021–2022: Fukushima Firebonds
- 2022–2024: Taoyuan Pilots
- 2024–present: New Taipei Kings

Career highlights
- TPBL champion (2025); TPBL Most Valuable Import (2025); P. League+ Import of the Year (2024); All-TPBL First Team (2025); All-P. League+ First Team (2024); P. League+ Mr. Clutch (2024); P. League+ rebounds leader (2024)
- Stats at Basketball Reference

Jason Colin Washburn (born June 5, 1990) is an American-Bulgarian professional basketball player for the New Taipei Kings of the Taiwan Professional Basketball League (TPBL). He played college basketball for the University of Utah.

== High school career ==
Washburn attended his hometown's Battle Creek Central High School, leading the team to the district championship and regional finals as a senior and district championships as a junior. As a junior, he averaged 17 points, eight rebounds and five blocked shots per game while averaging a double-double as a senior, with at least two triple-doubles (points, rebounds, blocks). He became the all-time blocks leader at BCC and set a new school record for blocks in a season and blocks in a game.

== College career ==
As a four-year player at Utah, Washburn appeared in 123 games with 70 starts and averaged 8.7 points, 5.0 rebounds and 1.3 blocks in 22.4 minutes per game, finishing as the Utes' leading scorer (11.4 ppg), rebounder (6.2 rpg) and shot blocker (1.4 bpg) as a junior in 2011–12.

== Professional career ==
On June 12, 2013, Washburn signed with Cherkaski Mavpy of the Ukrainian Basketball SuperLeague for the 2013–14 season. After averaging 14.1 points and 6.3 rebounds per game, he left Cherkaski on February 27, 2014. Four days later, he signed a one-month deal with Tsmoki-Minsk of the Belarusian Premier League.

On May 20, 2014, Washburn signed with Basic-Fit Brussels of the Belgian Ethias League, and that offseason, he joined the Utah Jazz for the 2014 Las Vegas Summer League. During the 2014–15 season, he played 27 games with the Belgian outfit, starting six and posting averages of 8.9 points, 3.9 rebounds and 0.8 blocks in 18.7 minutes per game.

On September 15, 2015, Washburn signed with the Charlotte Hornets. However, he was waived on October 23 after appearing in four preseason games. On November 3, he signed with Sigal Prishtina of the Kosovo Basketball Superleague.

In August 2016 Washburn signed with the Yokohama B-Corsairs for the inaugural season of the Japanese B.League. He was injured most of the 2017–18 season and missed most of the year. On August 21, 2018, Washburn signed with the Romanian club U-BT Cluj-Napoca.

Washburn signed with the Niigata Albirex on November 5, 2020.

On August 9, 2022, Washburn signed with the Taoyuan Pilots of the P. LEAGUE+.

On August 1, 2024, Washburn signed with the New Taipei Kings of the Taiwan Professional Basketball League (TPBL). On June 5, 2025, Washburn awarded the Most Valuable Import of the TPBL in 2024–25 season. On June 6, Washburn was selected to the All-TPBL First Team in 2024–25 season. On August 13, Washburn re-signed with the New Taipei Kings of the Taiwan Professional Basketball League (TPBL).

On August 5, 2026, Washburn re-signed with the New Taipei Kings of the Taiwan Professional Basketball League (TPBL).

== Personal life ==
Washburn is the son of Bob Washburn and Dawn Lewis and majored in Mass Communication.

== Career statistics ==
Legend
GP	Games played	GS	Games started	MPG	Minutes per game
FG%	Field goal percentage	3P%	3-point field goal percentage	FT%	Free throw percentage
RPG	Rebounds per game	APG	Assists per game	SPG	Steals per game
BPG	Blocks per game	PPG	Points per game	**Bold**	Career high

Year	Team	GP	GS	MPG	FG%	3P%	FT%	RPG	APG	SPG	BPG	TO	PPG
2016–17	Yokohama	51	37	26.5	.576	.500	.742	7.1	1.2	0.6	0.7	1.9	14.8
2017–18	Yokohama	4	4	21.5	.621	-	.706	5.8	1.0	0.2	0.8	2.5	12.0
2019–20	Yokohama												
