= List of 2025–26 TPBL season transactions =

This is a list of transactions that have taken place during the 2025 TPBL off-season and the 2025–26 TPBL season.

== Retirement ==
Date	Name	Team(s) played (years)	Age	Notes	Ref.
July 29	Douglas Creighton	Formosa Dreamers (2024–2025)	40	Also played in the SBL, PLG, and overseas. Hired as head coach by the Formosa Dreamers.	
August 2	Lin Li-Jen	New Taipei Kings (2024–2025)	35	TPBL champion (2025); Also played in the SBL, PLG, EASL, and the BCL Asia.	
August 31	Jeremy Lin	New Taipei Kings (2024–2025)	37	TPBL champion (2025); TPBL Most Valuable Player (2025); TPBL Finals MVP (2025); All-TPBL First Team (2025); TPBL All-Defensive First Team (2025); TPBL Clutch Play of the Year (2025); Also played in the PLG, EASL, and overseas.	
September 11	Chen Chun-Han	Taoyuan Taiwan Beer Leopards (2024–2025)	29	Also played in the SBL. Hired as coach by the Chih Ping Senior High School basketball team.	
February 23	Julian Boyd	Formosa Dreamers (2025–2026)	36	Also played in the ABL, PLG, SBL, BCL Asia, and overseas.	

== Front office movements ==
=== Head coaching changes ===
Off-season

Departure date	Team	Outgoing head coach	Reason for departure	Hire date	Incoming head coach	Last coaching position	Ref.
July 1	Formosa Dreamers	Jamie Pearlman	Assigned to associate head coach	July 29	Douglas Creighton	—N/a	
July 3	New Taipei CTBC DEA	Lee Yi-Hua	Left the team	August 25	Momir Ratković	New Taipei CTBC DEA assistant coach (2022–2025)	
July 5	New Taipei Kings	Ryan Marchand	Career decision	July 9	John Patrick	Riesen Ludwigsburg head coach (2024–2025)	
July 22	Taoyuan Taiwan Beer Leopards	Charles Dubé-Brais	Left the team	July 22	Henrik Rödl	Jordan men's national basketball team assistant coach (2025)	

In-season

Departure date	Team	Outgoing head coach	Reason for departure	Hire date	Incoming head coach	Last coaching position	Ref.
November 11	New Taipei Kings	John Patrick	Contract terminated	November 11	Thomas Wisman (interim)	New Taipei Kings assistant coach (2024–2025)	
November 13	New Taipei Kings	Thomas Wisman (interim)	Interim	November 13	Hung Chih-Shan (interim)	Yang Ming Senior High School assistant coach (2023–present); Yang Ming Senior High School junior high division coach (2023–present)	
December 31	Kaohsiung Aquas	Mathias Fischer	Contract terminated	December 31	Zhu Yong-Hong (interim)	Kaohsiung Aquas assistant coach (2021–2025)	
March 26	Taipei Taishin Mars	Hsu Hao-Cheng	Resigned	March 26	Milan Stevanovic (interim)	Taipei Mars / Taipei Taishin Mars assistant coach (2023–2026)	

=== Team president changes ===
Off-season

Departure date	Team	Outgoing member	Reason for departure	Hire date	Incoming member	Last managerial position	Ref.
—N/a	Taipei Taishin Mars	Tiao Chien-Sheng	Replaced	—N/a	Yang Yuan-Ming	—N/a	

== Player movements ==
=== Trades ===
July
July 22	To Kaohsiung Aquas: Shih Chin-Yao	To New Taipei CTBC DEA: Lin Jen-Hung

=== Free agents ===
Player	Date signed	New team	Former team	Ref.
Mohammad Al Bachir Gadiaga	June 13	New Taipei CTBC DEA	Akita Northern Happinets (Japan)	
Lin Sin-Kuan	June 20	Taoyuan Taiwan Beer Leopards		
Gao Jin-Wei	June 25	Taoyuan Taiwan Beer Leopards		
Ting Kuang-Hao	July 4	Taoyuan Taiwan Beer Leopards		
Liu Yuan-Kai	July 9	Taoyuan Taiwan Beer Leopards		
Randall Walko (HP)	July 9	Formosa Dreamers		
Tsao Xun-Xiang	July 11	Taoyuan Taiwan Beer Leopards	Taipei Taishin Mars	
Chou Po-Chen	July 11	Formosa Dreamers		
Lasan Kromah	July 14	Taoyuan Taiwan Beer Leopards		
Chiu Tzu-Hsuan	July 15	Kaohsiung Aquas		
Brandon Gilbeck	July 16	Formosa Dreamers		
Chen Huai-An	July 17	Kaohsiung Aquas		
Aric Holman	July 18	Formosa Dreamers		
Yu Chun-An	July 18	Kaohsiung Aquas		
Jian Ting-Jhao	July 21	New Taipei CTBC DEA	Taipei Fubon Braves (P. League+)	
Chien You-Che	July 25	New Taipei Kings		
Wang Po-Chih	July 26	New Taipei Kings		
James Ennis	July 30	Formosa Dreamers	Kagoshima Rebnise (Japan)	
Edgaras Želionis	August 1	Kaohsiung Aquas		
Justin James	August 2	Kaohsiung Aquas	Álftanes (Iceland)	
Cady Lalanne	August 3	Kaohsiung Aquas	Sagesse (Lebanon)	
Reid Travis	August 4	Kaohsiung Aquas	Sun Rockers Shibuya (Japan)	
Trey Thompkins	August 5	Formosa Dreamers	Básquet Coruña (Spain)	
Joseph Lin (HP)	August 6	New Taipei Kings		
Cheick Diallo	August 12	Taoyuan Taiwan Beer Leopards	Osos de Manatí (Puerto Rico)	
Jason Washburn	August 13	New Taipei Kings		
Anžejs Pasečņiks	August 13	Hsinchu Toplus Lioneers	Tofaş (Turkey)	
Austin Daye	August 14	New Taipei Kings		
Darral Willis	August 14	Taipei Taishin Mars	Aris (Greece)	
Chris McCullough	August 15	Taoyuan Taiwan Beer Leopards	Pelita Jaya (Indonesia)	
Jayden Gardner	August 19	New Taipei Kings	SC Rasta Vechta (Germany)	
Malcolm Miller	August 20	Taoyuan Taiwan Beer Leopards	Taipei Taishin Mars	
Isaiah Reese	August 20	Hsinchu Toplus Lioneers	Promitheas Patras (Greece)	
Chaundee Brown	August 21	New Taipei Kings	Kobe Storks (Japan)	
Liu Yen-Ting	August 21	Taipei Taishin Mars	Kaohsiung Steelers (P. League+)	
TJ Holyfield	August 22	Hsinchu Toplus Lioneers	Yamagata Wyverns (Japan)	
Viktor Gaddefors	August 25	New Taipei CTBC DEA	Twarde Pierniki Toruń (Poland)	
Marko Todorović	August 25	New Taipei CTBC DEA	New Taipei CTBC DEA (Waived on March 25, 2025)	
Nemanja Radović	August 25	New Taipei CTBC DEA	UCAM Murcia CB (Spain)	
Pavlin Ivanov	August 25	New Taipei CTBC DEA	CB Menorca (Spain)	
Tseng Wen-Ting	August 25	New Taipei CTBC DEA		
Lin Wei-Han	August 25	New Taipei CTBC DEA		
Wei Chia-Hao	August 25	New Taipei CTBC DEA		
Walter Lum	August 25	New Taipei CTBC DEA	Whitman	
Drew Pember	August 26	Hsinchu Toplus Lioneers	KK Mornar Bar (Montenegro)	
Hung Chih-Shan	August 29	New Taipei Kings		
Sani Sakakini (AI)	September 3	New Taipei Kings		
Jordy Tshimanga	September 3	Taipei Taishin Mars	Winnipeg Sea Bears (Canada)	
Lin Yan-Ting	September 5	New Taipei Kings	Beijing Royal Fighters (China)	
Stanton Kidd	September 8	Taipei Taishin Mars	Sendai 89ers (Japan)	
Karl Breuer	September 10	Hsinchu Toplus Lioneers (Trainee contract)	NTUA (Undrafted in 2025)	
Zach Lofton	September 10	Taipei Taishin Mars	Sagesse (Lebanon)	
Chung Li-Hsiang	October 7	New Taipei Kings (Trainee contract)	NCCU (Undrafted in 2025)	
Sun Szu-Yao	October 9	Taipei Taishin Mars	Kanazawa Samuraiz (Japan)	
Chris Ortiz	October 21	Kaohsiung Aquas	Osos de Manatí (Puerto Rico)	
Craig Sword	October 23	Hsinchu Toplus Lioneers	Kaohsiung Aquas	
Bogdan Bliznyuk	November 10	Kaohsiung Aquas	BC Jonava (Lithuania)	
Kristijan Krajina	November 23	Kaohsiung Aquas	KK Dubrava (Croatia)	
Jalen Harris	November 25	New Taipei Kings	Winnipeg Sea Bears (Canada)	
Wu Yen-Lun	December 6	Kaohsiung Aquas	Keelung Black Kites (Super Basketball League)	
Julian Boyd	December 16	Formosa Dreamers	Taoyuan Pauian Pilots (P. League+)	
Diamond Stone	December 16	Taipei Taishin Mars	Maccabi Kiryat Gat (Israel)	
Rade Zagorac	December 17	Kaohsiung Aquas	ONVO Büyükçekmece (Turkey)	
Beau Beech	December 22	New Taipei CTBC DEA	KK Zadar (Croatia)	
Sim Bhullar	December 26	Hsinchu Toplus Lioneers	Tainan TSG GhostHawks (T1 League)	
Ben Bentil	January 6	Formosa Dreamers	Mersin MSK (Turkey)	
Makur Maker	January 16	Taipei Taishin Mars	Sagesse (Lebanon)	
Olufemi Olujobi	January 16	New Taipei Kings	Altiri Chiba (Japan)	
Efe Odigie	January 20	Kaohsiung Aquas	Ulaanbaatar Xac Broncos (Mongolia)	
Jordan Tolbert	January 26	New Taipei Kings	BCH Knights (Mongolia)	
Michael Frazier	February 4	Taipei Taishin Mars	Palayesh Naft Abadan (Iran)	
Nick King	February 9	New Taipei CTBC DEA	Taipei Fubon Braves (P. League+)	
Hunter Maldonado	February 28	Kaohsiung Aquas	Brisbane Bullets (Australia)	
Marin Marić	March 2	Hsinchu Toplus Lioneers	Shenzhen Leopards (China)	
Youssou Ndoye	March 4	Taipei Taishin Mars	Dar City (Tanzania)	
Jade Tse	March 6	Hsinchu Toplus Lioneers	Yankey Ark (P. League+)	
Lin Yi-Huei			Taipei Taishin Mars	
Liu Min-Yan			New Taipei CTBC DEA	

=== Going to other Taiwanese leagues ===
Player	Date signed	New team	New league	Former team	Ref.
Wang Lu-Hsiang	July 11	TSG GhostHawks	P. League+	Taipei Taishin Mars (Via trade)	
Chen Chun-Nan	July 31	Yulon	Super Basketball League	New Taipei Kings	
Tony Mitchell	August 18	Taoyuan Taiwan Beer Leopards	The Asian Tournamrnt	New Taipei Kings	
Jonah Morrison	August 29	Taoyuan Pauian Pilots	P. League+	New Taipei CTBC DEA (Waived on November 21, 2024)	
Hsu Yu-Hui	October 11	Changhua Pauian BLL	Super Basketball League	New Taipei CTBC DEA	
Zhou Cheng-Rui	October 12	Changhua Pauian BLL	Super Basketball League	New Taipei CTBC DEA	
Chiang Kuang-Chien	October 22	Keelung Black Kites	Super Basketball League	Hsinchu Toplus Lioneers	
Wang Tzu-Kang	October 22	Keelung Black Kites	Super Basketball League	Hsinchu Toplus Lioneers	
Wang Chen-Yuan	October 22	Keelung Black Kites	Super Basketball League	Formosa Dreamers	
Lin Meng-Hsueh	October 22	Keelung Black Kites	Super Basketball League	New Taipei CTBC DEA (Waived on August 25)	
Wu I-Ping	October 22	Keelung Black Kites	Super Basketball League	Kaohsiung Aquas	
Quincy Davis	October 28	Yankey Ark	P. League+	New Taipei Kings	
Li Han-Sheng	January 2	Yankey Ark	P. League+	Hsinchu Toplus Lioneers (Waived on January 2)	
Chou Po-Hsun	January 2	Taiwan Beer	Super Basketball League	Hsinchu Toplus Lioneers	
Jamarcus Mearidy (FS)	February 2	Yankey Ark	P. League+	Hsinchu Toplus Lioneers	
Jayden Gardner	April 7	New Taipei Kings	Basketball Champions League Asia	New Taipei Kings	
Jordan Tolbert	April 7	New Taipei Kings	Basketball Champions League Asia	New Taipei Kings	

=== Going overseas ===
Player	Date signed	New team	New country	Former team	Ref.
Earl Clark	May 17	DMV Trilogy	United States	Hsinchu Toplus Lioneers	
Landers Nolley	May 24	Homenetmen Beirut	Lebanon	Hsinchu Toplus Lioneers	
Devin Williams	May 29	Changwon LG Sakers	Korea	Taoyuan Taiwan Beer Leopards	
Jeantal Cylla	June 18	Hubei Wenlv	China	Taipei Taishin Mars	
Micheal Eric	June 27	Changwon LG Sakers	Korea	Taipei Taishin Mars	
Kenny Manigault	July 7	Fukushima Firebonds	Japan	New Taipei Kings	
Daron Russell	July 25	U-BT Cluj-Napoca	Romania	New Taipei CTBC DEA	
Anthony Morse	July 25	Kipaş İstiklal Basketbol	Turkey	Kaohsiung Aquas	
Axel Toupane	August 20	FC Porto	Portugal	Taoyuan Taiwan Beer Leopards	
Nate Laszewski	August 24	Maccabi Ra'anana	Israel	Hsinchu Toplus Lioneers	
Markus Lončar	August 30	KK Cibona	Croatia	Formosa Dreamers	
Arnett Moultrie	September 9	Homs Al Fidaa	Syria	Kaohsiung Aquas (Waived on April 3, 2025)	
Egidijus Mockevičius	September 15	Club Atlético Aguada	Uruguay	Taoyuan Taiwan Beer Leopards	
Nysier Brooks	September 18	Hapoel Holon	Israel	New Taipei CTBC DEA	
Beau Beech	September 19	KK Zadar	Croatia	Formosa Dreamers	
Kristijan Krajina	September 27	KK Dubrava	Croatia	New Taipei CTBC DEA	
Ivan Aska	October 26	Jaguares UAM	Nicaragua	New Taipei CTBC DEA	
Isaiah Reese	November 22	BC Uralmash Yekaterinburg	Russia	Hsinchu Toplus Lioneers (Waived on November 24)	
Liu Jen-Hao	November 23	Hangzhou Jingwei	China	New Taipei CTBC DEA	
Ray McCallum	December 16	Hefei Storm	China	Taipei Taishin Mars	
Kaleb Wesson	December 26	Bogor Hornbills	Indonesia	Kaohsiung Aquas	
Kennedy Meeks	January 9	Saitama Broncos	Japan	Hsinchu Toplus Lioneers	
Chaundee Brown	January 10	London Lions	United Kingdom	New Taipei Kings (Waived on January 12)	
Pavlin Ivanov	January 12	Spartak Pleven	Bulgaria	New Taipei CTBC DEA (Waived on January 12)	
Jordy Tshimanga	January 16	Ulaanbaatar Xac Broncos	Mongolia	Taipei Taishin Mars (Waived on January 16)	
Justin James	January 18	Álftanes	Iceland	Kaohsiung Aquas (Waived on November 10)	
Zach Lofton	January 20	Al Ittihad Tripoli	Libya	Taipei Taishin Mars (Waived on December 24)	
Cady Lalanne	February 2	NLEX Road Warriors	Philippines	Kaohsiung Aquas (Waived on January 8)	
Rahlir Hollis-Jefferson	February 5	Kataja	Finland	Taipei Taishin Mars (Waived on March 16, 2025)	
A.J. Pacher	February 12	Valmiera Glass ViA	Latvia	Formosa Dreamers (Waived on March 18, 2025)	
Diamond Stone	February 27	Marinos de Anzoátegui	Venezuela	Taipei Taishin Mars (Waived on February 27)	
Adrien Moerman	March 2	Chorale Roanne	France	Taipei Taishin Mars	
Stanton Kidd	March 10	Changsha Yongsheng	China	Taipei Taishin Mars (Waived on March 4)	
James Ennis	March 12	Piratas de La Guaira	Venezuela	Formosa Dreamers (Waived on December 15)	
Chris Ortiz	March 18	Osos de Manatí	Puerto Rico	Kaohsiung Aquas (Waived on February 28)	
Iong Ngai-San (FS)	March 26	Macau Slot	Macau	Hsinchu Toplus Lioneers	
Craig Sword	April 6	Rayos de Hermosillo	Mexico	Hsinchu Toplus Lioneers (Waived on December 26)	

=== Waived ===
Player	Date waived	Former team	Ref.
Lin Meng-Hsueh	August 25	New Taipei CTBC DEA	
Justin James	November 10	Kaohsiung Aquas	
Isaiah Reese	November 24	Hsinchu Toplus Lioneers	
Reid Travis	December 1	Kaohsiung Aquas	
James Ennis	December 15	Formosa Dreamers	
Zach Lofton	December 24	Taipei Taishin Mars	
Craig Sword	December 26	Hsinchu Toplus Lioneers	
Li Han-Sheng	January 2	Hsinchu Toplus Lioneers	
Cady Lalanne	January 8	Kaohsiung Aquas	
Chaundee Brown	January 12	New Taipei Kings	
Pavlin Ivanov	January 12	New Taipei CTBC DEA	
Jordy Tshimanga	January 16	Taipei Taishin Mars	
Diamond Stone	February 27	Taipei Taishin Mars	
Chris Ortiz	February 28	Kaohsiung Aquas	
Stanton Kidd	March 4	Taipei Taishin Mars	
Efe Odigie	March 10	Kaohsiung Aquas	

(HP): Heritage players
(FS): Foreign students
(AI): Asian import players

== Draft ==
The 2025 TPBL draft was held on August 11, 2025, at Grand Hilai Taipei in Taipei City. 27 players participated in the draft, and eight players were chosen in two rounds.

Pick	Player	Date signed	Team	Ref.
1	Liu Cheng-Hsun	August 14	Hsinchu Toplus Lioneers	
2	Tseng Hsin-Wu	September 17	New Taipei CTBC DEA	
3	Hsu Hong-Wei	October 3	Taoyuan Taiwan Beer Leopards	
4	Xie Ming-Jun	August 20	Taipei Taishin Mars	
5	Mayaw Fotol	August 23	Kaohsiung Aquas	
6	Jonathan Smith	September 4	New Taipei Kings	
7	Wei Peng-Ho	August 20	Taipei Taishin Mars	
8	Ryder Hsiung	September 4	New Taipei Kings	

== See also ==
- 2025–26 Formosa Dreamers season
- 2025–26 Hsinchu Toplus Lioneers season
- 2025–26 Kaohsiung Aquas season
- 2025–26 New Taipei CTBC DEA season
- 2025–26 New Taipei Kings season
- 2025–26 Taipei Taishin Mars season
- 2025–26 Taoyuan Taiwan Beer Leopards season
