= Taipei Taishin Mars all-time roster =

The following is a list of players, both past and current, who appeared at least in one game for the Taipei Taishin Mars (2024–present) or Taipei Mars (2023–2024) franchise.

== Players ==
Note: Statistics are correct through the end of the 2025–26 TPBL season.

G	Guard	PG	Point guard	SG	Shooting guard	G/F	Guard-forward	F	Forward	SF	Small forward	PF	Power forward	F/C	Forward-center	C	Center

^{x}	Denotes player who is currently on the Taipei Taishin Mars roster
0.0	Denotes the Taipei Taishin Mars statistics leader (min. 40 games played for the team for per-game statistics)
player	Denotes player who has played for the Taipei Taishin Mars in the T1

=== C ===
Player	Name	Nat.	Pos.	From	Yrs	Seasons	Statistics									Ref.
Player	Name	Nat.	Pos.	From	Yrs	Seasons	GP	MP	PTS	REB	AST	MPG	PPG	RPG	APG	Ref.
Chang Chao-Chen	張兆辰	(Taiwan)	PF	NTNU	3	2023–2026	41	389:35	99	43	19	9:30	2.4	1.0	0.5	
Chang Keng-Yu	張耕淯	(Taiwan)	SG	NTUS	3	2023–2026	43	391:53	78	38	11	9:06	1.8	0.9	0.3	
Chen Kuan-Chuan^{x}	陳冠全	(Taiwan)	C	NTSU	3	2024–present	53	579:42	123	96	23	10:56	2.3	1.8	0.4	
Chen Wen-Hung^{x}	陳文宏	(Taiwan)	SF	NTSU	4	2023–present	93	2037:32	427	184	97	21:54	4.6	2.0	1.0	
Chiang Chun^{x}	江均	(Taiwan)	SF	FJU	3	2024–present	38	224:53	49	21	7	5:55	1.3	0.6	0.2	
Kenneth Chien	錢肯尼	(United States) (Taiwan)	SG	Broward	2	2024–2026	57	1523:12	539	165	91	26:43	9.5	2.9	1.6	
Jeantal Cylla	席樂	(Haiti) (United States)	SF	Arkansas	1	2024–2025	1	25:45	19	6	2	25:45	19.0	6.0	2.0	

=== E ===
Player	Name	Nat.	Pos.	From	Yrs	Seasons	Statistics									Ref.
Player	Name	Nat.	Pos.	From	Yrs	Seasons	GP	MP	PTS	REB	AST	MPG	PPG	RPG	APG	Ref.
Micheal Eric	艾力克	(Nigeria)	C	Temple	1	2024–2025	26	686:34	370	258	30	26:24	14.2	9.9	1.2	

=== F ===
Player	Name	Nat.	Pos.	From	Yrs	Seasons	Statistics									Ref.
Player	Name	Nat.	Pos.	From	Yrs	Seasons	GP	MP	PTS	REB	AST	MPG	PPG	RPG	APG	Ref.
Michael Frazier	弗利沙	(United States)	G	Florida	1	2025–2026	4	90:30	28	8	12	22:37	7.0	2.0	3.0	

=== G ===
Player	Name	Nat.	Pos.	From	Yrs	Seasons	Statistics									Ref.
Player	Name	Nat.	Pos.	From	Yrs	Seasons	GP	MP	PTS	REB	AST	MPG	PPG	RPG	APG	Ref.
Bryan Griffin^{x}	葛瑞菲	(United States)	PF	Xavier	1	2026–present	0	0:00	0	0	0	0:00	0.0	0.0	0.0	

=== H ===
Player	Name	Nat.	Pos.	From	Yrs	Seasons	Statistics									Ref.
Player	Name	Nat.	Pos.	From	Yrs	Seasons	GP	MP	PTS	REB	AST	MPG	PPG	RPG	APG	Ref.
Rahlir Hollis-Jefferson	赫里斯-傑佛森	(United States)	F	Temple	1	2023–2024	12	419:25	218	97	45	34:57	18.2	8.1	3.8	
Hsu Ching-En	許敬恩	(Taiwan)	SG	NTNU	1	2023–2024	3	4:38	0	0	1	1:32	0.0	0.0	0.3	
Huang Tsung-Han^{x}	黃聰翰	(Taiwan)	SF	MDU	4	2023–present	81	1956:56	614	174	61	24:09	7.6	2.1	0.8	

=== J ===
Player	Name	Nat.	Pos.	From	Yrs	Seasons	Statistics									Ref.
Player	Name	Nat.	Pos.	From	Yrs	Seasons	GP	MP	PTS	REB	AST	MPG	PPG	RPG	APG	Ref.
Jaylen Johnson	強森	(United States)	C	Louisville	1	2023–2024	21	672:53	316	207	60	32:02	15.0	9.9	2.9	

=== K ===
Player	Name	Nat.	Pos.	From	Yrs	Seasons	Statistics									Ref.
Player	Name	Nat.	Pos.	From	Yrs	Seasons	GP	MP	PTS	REB	AST	MPG	PPG	RPG	APG	Ref.
Stanton Kidd	基德	(United States)	SF	Colorado State	1	2025–2026	17	577:46	362	126	43	33:59	21.3	7.4	2.5	
Vladyslav Koreniuk	科倫紐克	(Ukraine)	C	Ukraine	1	2023–2024	10	256:27	129	84	11	25:38	12.9	8.4	1.1	

=== L ===
Player	Name	Nat.	Pos.	From	Yrs	Seasons	Statistics									Ref.
Player	Name	Nat.	Pos.	From	Yrs	Seasons	GP	MP	PTS	REB	AST	MPG	PPG	RPG	APG	Ref.
Lin Li	林勵	(Taiwan)	PG	NCCU	1	2023–2024	3	32:14	2	3	4	10:44	0.7	1.0	1.3	
Lin Ping-Sheng	林秉聖	(Taiwan)	SG	CCU	1	2023–2024	23	657:57	354	100	81	28:36	15.4	4.3	3.5	
Lin Ting-Chien^{x}	林庭謙	(Taiwan)	SG	Bryant	1	2026–present	0	0:00	0	0	0	0:00	0.0	0.0	0.0	
Lin Yi-Huei	林宜輝	(Taiwan)	PF	NTNU	2	2023–2025	28	273:55	77	34	24	9:46	2.8	1.2	0.9	
Liu Yen-Ting^{x}	劉彥廷	(Taiwan)	PF	OCU	3	2023–2024; 2025–present	25	237:11	69	53	9	9:29	2.8	2.1	0.4	
Zach Lofton	洛夫頓	(United States)	SG	New Mexico State	1	2025–2026	9	308:24	225	39	43	34:16	25.0	4.3	4.8	

=== M ===
Player	Name	Nat.	Pos.	From	Yrs	Seasons	Statistics									Ref.
Player	Name	Nat.	Pos.	From	Yrs	Seasons	GP	MP	PTS	REB	AST	MPG	PPG	RPG	APG	Ref.
Makur Maker	梅克	(South Sudan) (Australia)	C	Howard	1	2025–2026	11	430:56	288	143	37	39:10	26.2	13.0	3.4	
Samuel Manu^{x}	雷蒙恩	(Taiwan) (United States)	SF	UC Davis	3	2024–present	65	1957:38	678	317	150	30:07	10.4	4.9	2.3	
Marin Marić^{x}	馬利	(Croatia)	C	DePaul	1	2026–present	0	0:00	0	0	0	0:00	0.0	0.0	0.0	
Aleksandar Marelja^{x}	馬雷利亞	(Serbia)	SF	Serbia	1	2026–present	0	0:00	0	0	0	0:00	0.0	0.0	0.0	
Ray McCallum	麥卡倫	(United States)	G	Detroit Mercy	1	2024–2025	21	755:49	389	137	129	35:59	18.5	6.5	6.1	
Erik McCree	麥卡利	(United States)	F	Louisiana Tech	1	2023–2024	9	307:27	244	90	24	34:09	27.1	10.0	2.7	
Tyrus McGee^{x}	麥基	(United States)	PG	Iowa State	1	2026–present	0	0:00	0	0	0	0:00	0.0	0.0	0.0	
Malcolm Miller	米勒	(United States)	SF	Holy Cross	1	2024–2025	27	865:58	455	259	46	32:04	16.9	9.6	1.7	
Adrien Moerman	莫爾曼	(France)	F	France	1	2024–2025	13	407:57	198	169	23	31:22	15.2	13.0	1.8	
Byron Mullens	牧倫斯	(United States) (United Kingdom)	C	Ohio State	1	2024–2025	1	23:33	2	4	1	23:33	2.0	4.0	1.0	

=== N ===
Player	Name	Nat.	Pos.	From	Yrs	Seasons	Statistics									Ref.
Player	Name	Nat.	Pos.	From	Yrs	Seasons	GP	MP	PTS	REB	AST	MPG	PPG	RPG	APG	Ref.
Youssou Ndoye	恩多	(Senegal)	C	St. Bonaventure	2	2023–2024; 2025–2026	34	1119:04	584	403	51	32:54	17.2	11.9	1.5	

=== O ===
Player	Name	Nat.	Pos.	From	Yrs	Seasons	Statistics									Ref.
Player	Name	Nat.	Pos.	From	Yrs	Seasons	GP	MP	PTS	REB	AST	MPG	PPG	RPG	APG	Ref.
Devin Oliver	奧利佛	(United States)	PF	Dayton	1	2024–2025	5	173:09	84	52	11	34:37	16.8	10.4	2.2	

=== P ===
Player	Name	Nat.	Pos.	From	Yrs	Seasons	Statistics									Ref.
Player	Name	Nat.	Pos.	From	Yrs	Seasons	GP	MP	PTS	REB	AST	MPG	PPG	RPG	APG	Ref.
Danny Pippen	皮朋	(United States)	F	Kent State	1	2023–2024	9	193:13	94	48	10	21:28	10.4	5.3	1.1	

=== R ===
Player	Name	Nat.	Pos.	From	Yrs	Seasons	Statistics									Ref.
Player	Name	Nat.	Pos.	From	Yrs	Seasons	GP	MP	PTS	REB	AST	MPG	PPG	RPG	APG	Ref.
Thomas Robinson	羅賓森	(United States) (Lebanon)	F	Kansas	1	2024–2025	10	258:47	171	108	11	25:52	17.1	10.8	1.1	

=== S ===
Player	Name	Nat.	Pos.	From	Yrs	Seasons	Statistics									Ref.
Player	Name	Nat.	Pos.	From	Yrs	Seasons	GP	MP	PTS	REB	AST	MPG	PPG	RPG	APG	Ref.
Diamond Stone	史東	(United States)	C	Maryland	1	2025–2026	8	200:20	121	53	5	25:02	15.1	6.6	0.6	
Su Yi-Chin	蘇奕晉	(Taiwan)	PF	MDU	2	2024–2026	39	470:35	112	52	32	12:03	2.9	1.3	0.8	
Sun Szu-Yao	孫思堯	(Taiwan)	C	NYIT	3	2023–2026	23	135:43	19	22	5	5:54	0.8	1.0	0.2	

=== T ===
Player	Name	Nat.	Pos.	From	Yrs	Seasons	Statistics									Ref.
Player	Name	Nat.	Pos.	From	Yrs	Seasons	GP	MP	PTS	REB	AST	MPG	PPG	RPG	APG	Ref.
Ting Sheng-Ju^{x}	丁聖儒	(Taiwan)	PG	St. Francis	4	2023–present	90	2608:29	827	268	476	28:58	9.2	3.0	5.3	
Tsao Xun-Xiang	曹薰襄	(Taiwan) (Vietnam)	SG	NTUA	2	2023–2025	47	836:31	310	99	156	17:47	6.6	2.1	3.3	
Jordy Tshimanga	齊曼加	(Canada)	C	Dayton	1	2025–2026	8	226:36	89	102	7	28:19	11.1	12.8	0.9	

=== W ===
Player	Name	Nat.	Pos.	From	Yrs	Seasons	Statistics									Ref.
Player	Name	Nat.	Pos.	From	Yrs	Seasons	GP	MP	PTS	REB	AST	MPG	PPG	RPG	APG	Ref.
Wang Lu-Hsiang	王律翔	(Taiwan)	SG	CCUT	1	2024–2025	25	331:58	91	21	10	13:16	3.6	0.8	0.4	
Wang Sheng-Lin^{x}	王晟霖	(Taiwan)	C	LIT	1	2026–present	0	0:00	0	0	0	0:00	0.0	0.0	0.0	
Wei Peng-Ho^{x}	魏芃禾	(Taiwan) (Vietnam)	PG	NTNU	1	2025–present	24	185:14	38	17	25	7:43	1.6	0.7	1.0	
Darral Willis	威力斯	(United States) (Cyprus)	PF	Wichita State	1	2025–2026	18	581:06	415	226	34	32:17	23.1	12.6	1.9	
Wu Yung-Cheng^{x}	吳永盛	(Taiwan)	SG	Sacramento State	1	2026–present	0	0:00	0	0	0	0:00	0.0	0.0	0.0	
Wu Zhi-Kai^{x}	吳志鍇	(Taiwan)	SF	NCCU	1	2026–present	0	0:00	0	0	0	0:00	0.0	0.0	0.0	

=== X ===
Player	Name	Nat.	Pos.	From	Yrs	Seasons	Statistics									Ref.
Player	Name	Nat.	Pos.	From	Yrs	Seasons	GP	MP	PTS	REB	AST	MPG	PPG	RPG	APG	Ref.
Xie Ming-Jun^{x}	謝銘駿	(Taiwan)	SG	SCA	1	2025–present	32	570:05	143	63	31	17:48	4.5	2.0	1.0	

=== Z ===
Player	Name	Nat.	Pos.	From	Yrs	Seasons	Statistics									Ref.
Player	Name	Nat.	Pos.	From	Yrs	Seasons	GP	MP	PTS	REB	AST	MPG	PPG	RPG	APG	Ref.
Ihor Zaytsev	塞瑟夫	(Ukraine)	C	Ukraine	1	2024–2025	4	112:30	42	26	9	28:07	10.5	6.5	2.3	
