= 2025–26 Kaohsiung Aquas season =

Taiwanese professional basketball season

- President: Hou Chia-Chi
- Head Coach: Mathias Fischer (contract terminated); Zhu Yong-Hong (interim)
- Arena: Kaohsiung Arena

TPBL results
- Record: 9–27 (25.0%)
- Place: 7th
- Playoffs finish: Did not qualify

Player records
- Points: Kristijan Krajina 13.0
- Rebounds: Kristijan Krajina 10.7
- Assists: Su Wen-Ju 2.7

The 2025–26 Kaohsiung Aquas season was the franchise's fifth season, its second season in the Taiwan Professional Basketball League (TPBL).

The Aquas were coached by Mathias Fischer in his second year as head coach. On December 31, 2025, the Aquas announced to terminate contract relationship with Mathias Fischer, and named Zhu Yong-Hong, the assistant coach of the Kaohsiung Aquas, as their interim head coach.

== Draft ==
| Round | Pick | Player | Position(s) | School / club team |
|---|---|---|---|---|
| 1 | 5 | Mayaw Fotol | Forward | NTSU |

- Reference：

== Roster ==
2025–26 Kaohsiung Aquas roster
Players
Coaches

| Pos. | No. | Nat. | Name | Ht. | Wt. | Age | From |
|---|---|---|---|---|---|---|---|
| PG | 0 | (Taiwan) (Vietnam) | Wei Liang-Che | 1.85 m (6 ft 1 in) | 78 kg (172 lb) | 24 – 28 November 2001 | NKNU |
| PF | 1 | (Lithuania) | Edgaras Želionis (I) | 2.08 m (6 ft 10 in) | 100 kg (220 lb) | 36 – 4 June 1989 | Lithuania |
| C | 5 | (Croatia) | Kristijan Krajina (I) | 2.08 m (6 ft 10 in) | 111 kg (245 lb) | 35 – 28 December 1990 | Mount St. Mary's |
| SG | 7 | (Taiwan) | Yu Huan-Ya | 1.82 m (6 ft 0 in) | 81 kg (179 lb) | 32 – 30 November 1993 | NTNU |
| SG | 8 | (Taiwan) | Chiu Tzu-Hsuan | 1.90 m (6 ft 3 in) | 89 kg (196 lb) | 26 – 8 December 1999 | ISU |
| SF | 9 | (Taiwan) | Tang Wei-Chieh | 1.92 m (6 ft 4 in) | 89 kg (196 lb) | 26 – 25 September 1999 | VMI |
| PF | 10 | (Taiwan) | Hu Long-Mao | 1.96 m (6 ft 5 in) | 101 kg (223 lb) | 33 – 22 December 1992 | Chaminade |
| SG | 11 | (Taiwan) | Shih Chin-Yao | 1.88 m (6 ft 2 in) | 86 kg (190 lb) | 35 – 28 October 1990 | CCU |
| G | 12 | (United States) | Hunter Maldonado (I) | 1.98 m (6 ft 6 in) | 95 kg (209 lb) | 27 – 24 March 1999 | Wyoming |
| PF | 21 | (Taiwan) | Lu Wei-Ting | 2.01 m (6 ft 7 in) | 103 kg (227 lb) | 29 – 16 April 1997 | ISU |
| PG | 23 | (Taiwan) | Wu Yen-Lun | 1.82 m (6 ft 0 in) | 72 kg (159 lb) | 28 – 18 June 1997 | ISU |
| SG | 24 | (Taiwan) | Su Wen-Ju | 1.87 m (6 ft 2 in) | 78 kg (172 lb) | 28 – 16 October 1997 | ISU |
| PF | 25 | (Serbia) | Rade Zagorac (I) | 2.05 m (6 ft 9 in) | 100 kg (220 lb) | 30 – 12 August 1995 | Serbia |
| SG | 28 | (Taiwan) | Yu Chun-An (C) | 1.89 m (6 ft 2 in) | 83 kg (183 lb) | 34 – 13 February 1992 | NTNU |
| SF | 30 | (Taiwan) | Mayaw Fotol | 1.90 m (6 ft 3 in) | 95 kg (209 lb) | 22 – 7 July 2003 | NTSU |
| SF | 57 | (Taiwan) | Wu Siao-Jin | 1.90 m (6 ft 3 in) | 81 kg (179 lb) | 30 – 28 August 1995 | NKNU |
| PG | 66 | (Taiwan) | Chen Huai-An | 1.86 m (6 ft 1 in) | 86 kg (190 lb) | 29 – 29 April 1997 | NTUA |
| C | 85 | (Taiwan) | Chin Ming-Ching | 1.95 m (6 ft 5 in) | 106 kg (234 lb) | 31 – 14 November 1994 | NTNU |

Head coach

- (Taiwan) Zhu Yong-Hong (interim)

Assistant coach(es)

- (Taiwan) Liao Che-Yi
- (Taiwan) Lee Cheng-Yen

Athletic trainer(s)

- (Taiwan) Liao Hsuan-Yi
- (Taiwan) Wu You-Ting

Legend

- (C) Team captain
- (I) Import player
- Injured

- Roster
Updated: May 3, 2026

== Preseason ==
=== Game log ===
2025 preseason game log
Total: 1–1 (home: 0–1; road: 1–0)
Preseason : 1–1 (home: 0–1; road: 1–0)

| Game | Date | Team | Score | High points | High rebounds | High assists | Location Attendance | Record |
|---|---|---|---|---|---|---|---|---|
| 1 | October 3 | Lioneers | L 88–98 | Yu Chun-An (14) | Cady Lalanne (11) | Hu Long-Mao (4) | Pingtung County Stadium | 0–1 |
| 2 | October 5 | @ Mars | W 93–79 | Wu Siao-Jin (23) | Lu Wei-Ting (12) | Hu Long-Mao (5); Chen Huai-An (5) | Pingtung County Stadium | 1–1 |

Color： Win Lose
Schedule

== Regular season ==
=== Standings ===
| Pos | Team | Pld | W | L | PCT | GB | Qualification |
|---|---|---|---|---|---|---|---|
| 1 | Taoyuan Taiwan Beer Leopards | 36 | 23 | 13 | .639 | — | Advance to semifinals |
| 2 | Formosa Dreamers | 36 | 22 | 14 | .611 | 1 | Advance to semifinals |
| 3 | Hsinchu Toplus Lioneers | 36 | 22 | 14 | .611 | 1 | Advance to semifinals |
| 4 | New Taipei CTBC DEA | 36 | 20 | 16 | .556 | 3 | Advance to play-in |
| 5 | New Taipei Kings | 36 | 19 | 17 | .528 | 4 | Advance to play-in |
| 6 | Taipei Taishin Mars | 36 | 11 | 25 | .306 | 12 | |
| 7 | Kaohsiung Aquas | 36 | 9 | 27 | .250 | 14 | |

Source: TPBL

=== Game log ===
2025–26 regular season game log
Total: 9–27 (home: 5–13; road: 4–14)
October : 2–3 (home: 1–2; road: 1–1)

| Game | Date | Team | Score | High points | High rebounds | High assists | Location Attendance | Record |
|---|---|---|---|---|---|---|---|---|
| 1 | October 11 | @ Kings | L 100–110 | Justin James (28) | Justin James (14); Cady Lalanne (14) | Justin James (8) | Xinzhuang Gymnasium; 4,568 | 0–1 |
| 2 | October 18 | @ Dreamers | W 106–101 | Reid Travis (24) | Reid Travis (13) | Yu Huan-Ya (7) | Taichung Intercontinental Basketball Stadium; 2,616 | 1–1 |
| 3 | October 25 | Kings | W 91–79 | Justin James (24) | Cady Lalanne (12) | Yu Huan-Ya (3) | Kaohsiung Arena; 7,138 | 2–1 |
| 4 | October 26 | Lioneers | L 82–101 | Cady Lalanne (23) | Cady Lalanne (11) | Justin James (4) | Kaohsiung Arena; 4,531 | 2–2 |
| 5 | October 29 | Dreamers | L 86–99 | Hu Long-Mao (28) | Chris Ortiz (7); Reid Travis (7) | Chen Huai-An (8) | Kaohsiung Arena; 2,861 | 2–3 |

November : 1–4 (home: 0–2; road: 1–2)

| Game | Date | Team | Score | High points | High rebounds | High assists | Location Attendance | Record |
|---|---|---|---|---|---|---|---|---|
| 6 | November 1 | Mars | L 105–110 | Justin James (27) | Cady Lalanne (11) | Justin James (5) | Kaohsiung Arena; 3,657 | 2–4 |
| 7 | November 2 | Leopards | L 78–100 | Cady Lalanne (27) | Cady Lalanne (13) | Chen Huai-An (4) | Kaohsiung Arena; 3,544 | 2–5 |
| 8 | November 9 | @ Kings | L 94–111 | Hu Long-Mao (20) | Cady Lalanne (14) | Su Wen-Ju (7) | Xinzhuang Gymnasium; 4,085 | 2–6 |
| 9 | November 16 | @ Lioneers | L 89–97 | Chris Ortiz (24) | Bogdan Bliznyuk (9) | Su Wen-Ju (6) | Hsinchu County Stadium; 4,821 | 2–7 |
| 10 | November 19 | @ Leopards | W 112–90 | Su Wen-Ju (31) | Bogdan Bliznyuk (11) | Bogdan Bliznyuk (12) | Taoyuan Arena; 2,933 | 3–7 |

December : 1–3 (home: 1–1; road: 0–2)

| Game | Date | Team | Score | High points | High rebounds | High assists | Location Attendance | Record |
|---|---|---|---|---|---|---|---|---|
| 11 | December 7 | @ Mars | L 91–96 (OT) | Bogdan Bliznyuk (31) | Bogdan Bliznyuk (13) | Bogdan Bliznyuk (8) | Taipei Heping Basketball Gymnasium; 4,086 | 3–8 |
| 12 | December 13 | Lioneers | W 99–89 | Bogdan Bliznyuk (20) | Kristijan Krajina (10) | Bogdan Bliznyuk (11) | Kaohsiung Arena; 4,614 | 4–8 |
| 13 | December 14 | Dreamers | L 73–99 | Chris Ortiz (14) | Kristijan Krajina (13) | Bogdan Bliznyuk (5) | Kaohsiung Arena; 5,016 | 4–9 |
| 14 | December 28 | @ Kings | L 82–86 | Bogdan Bliznyuk (22) | Kristijan Krajina (17) | Hu Long-Mao (4) | Xinzhuang Gymnasium; 6,500 | 4–10 |

January : 2–4 (home: 2–3; road: 0–1)

| Game | Date | Team | Score | High points | High rebounds | High assists | Location Attendance | Record |
|---|---|---|---|---|---|---|---|---|
| 15 | January 3 | Leopards | L 102–108 | Yu Huan-Ya (27) | Rade Zagorac (8) | Rade Zagorac (6) | Kaohsiung Arena; 4,810 | 4–11 |
| 16 | January 4 | Kings | L 94–111 | Bogdan Bliznyuk (21) | Bogdan Bliznyuk (15) | Bogdan Bliznyuk (9) | Kaohsiung Arena; 4,761 | 4–12 |
| 17 | January 7 | Mars | W 108–103 | Bogdan Bliznyuk (33) | Kristijan Krajina (11) | Bogdan Bliznyuk (6); Kristijan Krajina (6) | Kaohsiung Arena; 2,815 | 5–12 |
| 18 | January 10 | DEA | W 114–111 | Kristijan Krajina (29) | Bogdan Bliznyuk (10); Kristijan Krajina (10) | Yu Huan-Ya (8) | Kaohsiung Arena; 4,950 | 6–12 |
| 19 | January 11 | Lioneers | L 79–95 | Bogdan Bliznyuk (28) | Bogdan Bliznyuk (8); Kristijan Krajina (8) | Kristijan Krajina (3) | Kaohsiung Arena; 4,858 | 6–13 |
| 20 | January 24 | @ DEA | L 91–133 | Efe Odigie (29) | Efe Odigie (8) | Chen Huai-An (5) | Xinzhuang Gymnasium; 4,006 | 6–14 |

February : 1–3 (home: 0–2; road: 1–1)

| Game | Date | Team | Score | High points | High rebounds | High assists | Location Attendance | Record |
|---|---|---|---|---|---|---|---|---|
| 21 | February 1 | @ Dreamers | L 93–96 | Yu Huan-Ya (22) | Tang Wei-Chieh (10); Lu Wei-Ting (10) | Yu Huan-Ya (10) | Taichung Intercontinental Basketball Stadium; 2,899 | 6–15 |
| 22 | February 7 | Leopards | L 75–101 | Wu Siao-Jin (13); Rade Zagorac (13) | Rade Zagorac (8); Efe Odigie (8) | Wei Liang-Che (3); Rade Zagorac (3) | Kaohsiung Arena; 5,075 | 6–16 |
| 23 | February 8 | DEA | L 84–113 | Efe Odigie (18) | Kristijan Krajina (11); Efe Odigie (11) | Chen Huai-An (8) | Kaohsiung Arena; 4,659 | 6–17 |
| 24 | February 11 | @ Mars | W 104–90 | Rade Zagorac (28) | Kristijan Krajina (15) | Chen Huai-An (5) | Taipei Heping Basketball Gymnasium; 3,291 | 7–17 |

March : 2–4 (home: 1–1; road: 1–3)

| Game | Date | Team | Score | High points | High rebounds | High assists | Location Attendance | Record |
|---|---|---|---|---|---|---|---|---|
| 25 | March 7 | Dreamers | L 97–107 | Hunter Maldonado (30) | Kristijan Krajina (9) | Hunter Maldonado (4); Kristijan Krajina (4) | Kaohsiung Arena; 6,051 | 7–18 |
| 26 | March 8 | DEA | W 90–88 | Su Wen-Ju (20) | Kristijan Krajina (12) | Yu Huan-Ya (7) | Kaohsiung Arena; 3,908 | 8–18 |
| 27 | March 14 | @ Lioneers | L 97–113 | Hunter Maldonado (23) | Hunter Maldonado (13) | Su Wen-Ju (7) | Hsinchu County Stadium; 5,217 | 8–19 |
| 28 | March 21 | @ DEA | L 91–118 | Lu Wei-Ting (20) | Lu Wei-Ting (8) | Su Wen-Ju (4) | Xinzhuang Gymnasium; 4,059 | 8–20 |
| 29 | March 25 | @ Dreamers | L 90–96 | Hunter Maldonado (23) | Edgaras Želionis (10); Hunter Maldonado (10) | Hunter Maldonado (8) | Taichung Intercontinental Basketball Stadium; 3,000 | 8–21 |
| 30 | March 28 | @ Mars | W 112–104 | Hunter Maldonado (31) | Edgaras Želionis (15) | Hunter Maldonado (13) | Taipei Heping Basketball Gymnasium; 4,658 | 9–21 |

April : 0–5 (home: 0–2; road: 0–3)

| Game | Date | Team | Score | High points | High rebounds | High assists | Location Attendance | Record |
|---|---|---|---|---|---|---|---|---|
| 31 | April 4 | @ Leopards | L 74–105 | Edgaras Želionis (21) | Edgaras Želionis (13) | Hu Long-Mao (5); Su Wen-Ju (5) | Taoyuan City Zhongli Civil Sports Center; 2,000 | 9–22 |
| 32 | April 11 | Kings | L 111–112 | Edgaras Želionis (26) | Kristijan Krajina (13) | Hunter Maldonado (8) | Kaohsiung Arena; 5,299 | 9–23 |
| 33 | April 12 | Mars | L 93–104 | Shih Chin-Yao (25) | Kristijan Krajina (17) | Kristijan Krajina (7) | Kaohsiung Arena; 3,188 | 9–24 |
| 34 | April 19 | @ DEA | L 99–115 | Hunter Maldonado (33) | Kristijan Krajina (23) | Hunter Maldonado (5) | Xinzhuang Gymnasium; 3,817 | 9–25 |
| 35 | April 25 | @ Leopards | L 85–99 | Edgaras Želionis (33) | Hunter Maldonado (10) | Hunter Maldonado (14) | Taoyuan Arena; 5,733 | 9–26 |

May : 0–1 (home: 0–0; road: 0–1)

| Game | Date | Team | Score | High points | High rebounds | High assists | Location Attendance | Record |
|---|---|---|---|---|---|---|---|---|
| 36 | May 3 | @ Lioneers | L 99–102 | Su Wen-Ju (22) | Edgaras Želionis (15) | Shih Chin-Yao (5) | Hsinchu County Stadium; 4,887 | 9–27 |

Color： Win Lose
Schedule

== Player statistics ==
Legend
| GP | Games played | MPG | Minutes per game | FG% | Field goal percentage |
| 3P% | 3-point field goal percentage | FT% | Free throw percentage | RPG | Rebounds per game |
| APG | Assists per game | SPG | Steals per game | BPG | Blocks per game |
| PPG | Points per game | | Led the league |

=== Regular season ===
| Player | GP | MPG | PPG | FG% | 3P% | FT% | RPG | APG | SPG | BPG |
|---|---|---|---|---|---|---|---|---|---|---|
| Wei Liang-Che | 12 | 12:09 | 2.8 | 34.2% | 41.7% | 50.0% | 1.0 | 1.1 | 0.4 | 0.0 |
| Edgaras Želionis | 9 | 34:26 | 19.8 | 44.2% | 31.1% | 72.5% | 9.4 | 2.3 | 0.8 | 0.4 |
| Justin James^{‡} | 4 | 33:46 | 23.0 | 44.3% | 10.0% | 71.4% | 9.5 | 4.8 | 2.0 | 0.5 |
| Kristijan Krajina^{≠} | 22 | 30:30 | 13.0 | 49.4% | 15.0% | 81.8% | 10.7 | 2.3 | 1.0 | 0.3 |
| Chris Ortiz^{≠‡} | 12 | 26:14 | 12.2 | 38.6% | 30.6% | 73.1% | 5.0 | 1.4 | 1.2 | 0.3 |
| Yu Huan-Ya | 20 | 26:22 | 8.8 | 32.7% | 32.2% | 82.6% | 1.6 | 3.6 | 0.7 | 0.1 |
| Chiu Tzu-Hsuan | Did not play | | | | | | | | | |
| Tang Wei-Chieh | 10 | 15:09 | 4.3 | 31.5% | 25.0% | 50.0% | 3.8 | 1.0 | 0.7 | 0.0 |
| Hu Long-Mao | 34 | 27:57 | 11.0 | 45.5% | 46.0% | 73.4% | 3.4 | 2.1 | 0.9 | 0.2 |
| Shih Chin-Yao | 29 | 21:14 | 6.1 | 42.2% | 36.3% | 57.7% | 1.7 | 1.4 | 1.0 | 0.1 |
| Hunter Maldonado^{≠} | 9 | 34:34 | 23.0 | 46.3% | 22.9% | 60.5% | 6.7 | 6.8 | 1.2 | 0.1 |
| Lu Wei-Ting | 28 | 15:49 | 5.0 | 36.4% | 30.9% | 71.7% | 3.6 | 0.8 | 0.6 | 0.3 |
| Reid Travis^{‡} | 4 | 31:01 | 15.0 | 43.9% | 26.7% | 35.3% | 8.8 | 1.3 | 0.5 | 0.5 |
| Wu Yen-Lun^{≠} | 16 | 16:04 | 3.4 | 34.5% | 18.4% | 80.0% | 1.8 | 1.1 | 0.5 | 0.0 |
| Su Wen-Ju | 26 | 35:25 | 12.9 | 41.6% | 38.0% | 80.4% | 4.6 | 2.7 | 1.1 | 0.2 |
| Rade Zagorac^{≠} | 7 | 23:47 | 14.7 | 43.2% | 33.3% | 78.3% | 7.1 | 2.1 | 1.3 | 0.4 |
| Yu Chun-An | 19 | 11:23 | 3.4 | 41.4% | 28.6% | 50.0% | 1.3 | 0.6 | 0.6 | 0.1 |
| Mayaw Fotol | 21 | 14:27 | 4.9 | 38.8% | 38.5% | 77.3% | 1.5 | 0.4 | 0.5 | 0.1 |
| Bogdan Bliznyuk^{≠} | 11 | 38:34 | 22.7 | 48.7% | 38.3% | 80.9% | 9.4 | 6.5 | 1.8 | 0.5 |
| Efe Odigie^{≠‡} | 5 | 23:43 | 17.0 | 47.9% | 17.6% | 80.0% | 7.6 | 0.6 | 1.0 | 0.2 |
| Wu Siao-Jin | 33 | 19:57 | 5.2 | 34.9% | 31.5% | 69.6% | 1.5 | 0.5 | 0.7 | 0.1 |
| Chen Huai-An | 22 | 16:07 | 3.8 | 31.5% | 19.7% | 77.8% | 1.2 | 2.3 | 1.1 | 0.2 |
| Chin Ming-Ching | 19 | 8:43 | 0.8 | 25.0% | 0.0% | 53.8% | 1.6 | 0.2 | 0.2 | 0.1 |
| Cady Lalanne^{‡} | 12 | 30:00 | 15.8 | 40.9% | 22.6% | 76.4% | 9.5 | 1.3 | 0.8 | 0.8 |

^{‡} Left during the season
^{≠} Acquired during the season

- Reference：

== Transactions ==
On March 9, 2026, Bogdan Bliznyuk was not registered in the 2025–26 TPBL season final rosters.

=== Overview ===
Players added

Via draft

- Mayaw Fotol

Via trade

- Shih Chin-Yao

Via free agency

- Bogdan Bliznyuk
- Justin James
- Kristijan Krajina
- Cady Lalanne
- Hunter Maldonado
- Efe Odigie
- Chris Ortiz
- Reid Travis
- Wu Yen-Lun
- Rade Zagorac
Players lost

Via trade

- Lin Jen-Hung

Via free agency

- Anthony Morse
- Craig Sword
- Kaleb Wesson
- Wu I-Ping

Waived

- Justin James
- Cady Lalanne
- Efe Odigie
- Chris Ortiz
- Reid Travis

=== Trades ===
| Date | Trade | | Ref. |
|---|---|---|---|
| July 22, 2025 | To Kaohsiung Aquas: Shih Chin-Yao | To New Taipei CTBC DEA: Lin Jen-Hung | |

=== Free agency ===
==== Re-signed ====
| Date | Player | Contract terms | Ref. |
|---|---|---|---|
| July 15, 2025 | Chiu Tzu-Hsuan | 4-year contract, worth unknown | |
| July 17, 2025 | Chen Huai-An | 3-year contract, worth unknown | |
| July 18, 2025 | Yu Chun-An | 3-year contract, worth unknown | |
| August 1, 2025 | Edgaras Želionis | —N/a | |

==== Additions ====
| Date | Player | Contract terms | Former team | Ref. |
|---|---|---|---|---|
| August 2, 2025 | Justin James | —N/a | (Iceland) Álftanes | |
| August 3, 2025 | Cady Lalanne | —N/a | (Lebanon) Sagesse | |
| August 4, 2025 | Reid Travis | —N/a | (Japan) Sun Rockers Shibuya | |
| August 23, 2025 | Mayaw Fotol | —N/a | (Taiwan) NTSU | |
| October 21, 2025 | Chris Ortiz | —N/a | (Puerto Rico) Osos de Manatí | |
| November 10, 2025 | Bogdan Bliznyuk | —N/a | (Lithuania) BC Jonava | |
| November 23, 2025 | Kristijan Krajina | —N/a | (Croatia) KK Dubrava | |
| December 6, 2025 | Wu Yen-Lun | —N/a | (Taiwan) Keelung Black Kites | |
| December 17, 2025 | Rade Zagorac | —N/a | (Turkey) ONVO Büyükçekmece | |
| January 20, 2026 | Efe Odigie | —N/a | (Mongolia) Ulaanbaatar Xac Broncos | |
| February 28, 2026 | Hunter Maldonado | —N/a | (Australia) Brisbane Bullets | |

==== Subtractions ====
| Date | Player | Reason | New team | Ref. |
|---|---|---|---|---|
| July 25, 2025 | Anthony Morse | Contract expired | (Turkey) Kipaş İstiklal Basketbol | |
| July 29, 2025 | Craig Sword | Contract expired | (Taiwan) Hsinchu Toplus Lioneers | |
| July 29, 2025 | Kaleb Wesson | Contract expired | (Indonesia) Bogor Hornbills | |
| July 31, 2025 | Wu I-Ping | Contract expired | (Taiwan) Keelung Black Kites | |
| November 10, 2025 | Justin James | Contract terminated | (Iceland) Álftanes | |
| December 1, 2025 | Reid Travis | Contract terminated | (Japan) Akita Northern Happinets | |
| January 8, 2026 | Cady Lalanne | Contract terminated | (Philippines) NLEX Road Warriors | |
| February 28, 2026 | Chris Ortiz | Contract terminated | (Puerto Rico) Osos de Manatí | |
| March 10, 2026 | Efe Odigie | Contract terminated | (China) Henan Jiaozuo | |

== Awards ==
=== Yearly awards ===
| Recipient | Award | Ref. |
|---|---|---|
| Su Wen-Ju | All-Defensive Second Team | |
| Su Wen-Ju | All-TPBL Second Team | |

=== Player of the Week ===
| Week | Recipient | Award | Ref. |
|---|---|---|---|
| 7 | Bogdan Bliznyuk | Week 7 Player of the Week | |
| 13 | Bogdan Bliznyuk | Week 13 Player of the Week | |
