= 2025–26 Taipei Taishin Mars season =

Taiwanese professional basketball season

- President: Yang Yuan-Ming
- General Manager: Lin You-Ting
- Head Coach: Hsu Hao-Cheng (resigned); Milan Stevanovic (interim)
- Arena: Taipei Heping Basketball Gymnasium

TPBL results
- Record: 11–25 (30.6%)
- Place: 6th
- Playoffs finish: Did not qualify

Player records
- Points: Ting Sheng-Ju 12.9
- Rebounds: Samuel Manu 5.3
- Assists: Ting Sheng-Ju 7.7

The 2025–26 Taipei Taishin Mars season was the franchise's third season, its second season in the Taiwan Professional Basketball League (TPBL).

The Mars were coached by Hsu Hao-Cheng in his third year as their head coach. On March 26, 2026, the Mars announced that Hsu Hao-Cheng resigned from head coach, and named Milan Stevanovic, the assistant coach of the Taipei Taishin Mars, as their interim head coach.

== Draft ==
Round	Pick	Player	Position(s)	School / club team
1	4	Xie Ming-Jun	Forward	Southern Coast Academy
2	7	Wei Peng-Ho	Guard	NTNU

- Reference：

== Roster ==
2025–26 Taipei Taishin Mars roster
Players
Coaches

Pos.	No.	Nat.	Name	Ht.	Wt.	Age	From
PG	3	(Taiwan)	Ting Sheng-Ju	1.74 m (5 ft 9 in)	75 kg (165 lb)	27 – 22 August 1998	St. Francis
C	4	(South Sudan) (Australia)	Makur Maker (I)	2.08 m (6 ft 10 in)	107 kg (236 lb)	25 – 4 November 2000	Howard
PG	5	(Taiwan) (Vietnam)	Wei Peng-Ho	1.77 m (5 ft 10 in)	72 kg (159 lb)	23 – 3 January 2003	NTNU
SF	6	(Taiwan)	Chiang Chun	1.93 m (6 ft 4 in)	93 kg (205 lb)	24 – 11 September 2001	FJU
PF	7	(Taiwan)	Liu Yen-Ting	1.96 m (6 ft 5 in)	96 kg (212 lb)	26 – 7 January 2000	OCU
SF	8	(Taiwan)	Chen Wen-Hung (C)	1.88 m (6 ft 2 in)	98 kg (216 lb)	34 – 14 July 1991	NTSU
PF	9	(Taiwan)	Chang Chao-Chen	1.96 m (6 ft 5 in)	97 kg (214 lb)	25 – 2 September 2000	NTNU
SF	11	(Taiwan)	Huang Tsung-Han	1.93 m (6 ft 4 in)	96 kg (212 lb)	31 – 7 July 1994	MDU
G	12	(United States)	Michael Frazier (I)	1.91 m (6 ft 3 in)	91 kg (201 lb)	32 – 8 March 1994	Florida
G	15	(Taiwan)	Xie Ming-Jun	1.90 m (6 ft 3 in)	85 kg (187 lb)	20 – 11 November 2005	SCA
C	20	(Taiwan)	Sun Szu-Yao	2.03 m (6 ft 8 in)	105 kg (231 lb)	28 – 3 October 1997	NYIT
PF	21	(United States) (Cyprus)	Darral Willis (I)	2.06 m (6 ft 9 in)	103 kg (227 lb)	30 – 21 January 1996	Wichita State
SG	23	(United States) (Taiwan)	Kenneth Chien	1.86 m (6 ft 1 in)	88 kg (194 lb)	31 – 6 February 1995	Broward
SG	29	(Taiwan)	Chang Keng-Yu	1.88 m (6 ft 2 in)	88 kg (194 lb)	30 – 16 October 1995	NTUS
G	33	(Taiwan) (United States)	Samuel Manu	1.97 m (6 ft 6 in)	91 kg (201 lb)	25 – 24 September 2000	UC Davis
C	35	(Senegal)	Youssou Ndoye (I)	2.13 m (7 ft 0 in)	113 kg (249 lb)	34 – 15 July 1991	St. Bonaventure
PF	41	(Taiwan)	Su Yi-Chin	1.95 m (6 ft 5 in)	95 kg (209 lb)	32 – 29 December 1993	MDU
C	62	(Taiwan)	Chen Kuan-Chuan	1.97 m (6 ft 6 in)	105 kg (231 lb)	32 – 30 December 1993	NTSU

Head coach

- (Serbia) Milan Stevanovic (interim)

Assistant coach(es)

- (Taiwan) Hsu Hao-Cheng
- (Taiwan) Ni Hsueh-Chien
- (Taiwan) Chen Shih-Nien

Strength & conditioning coach(es)

- (Taiwan) Chen Sheng-Chuan
- (Taiwan) Liu Yu-Jie

Athletic trainer(s)

- (Taiwan) Chien Shao-Fu

Team manager

- (Taiwan) Lin You-Ting

Legend

- (C) Team captain
- (I) Import player
- Injured

- Roster
Updated: May 2, 2026

== Shiga Lakes Taiwan Camp ==
August 26, 2025

Shiga Lakes	83–51	Taipei Taishin Mars

Fu Jen Catholic University Chung Mei Auditorium, New Taipei City

== International friendship match ==
=== Game log ===
September 12, 2025
13:30 (UTC+8)

Seoul SK Knights	87–73	Taipei Taishin Mars

Beitou Resort Basketball Court, Taipei City

September 19, 2025

Shimane Susanoo Magic	83–70	Taipei Taishin Mars

Taipei Datong Sports Center, Taipei City

== Interleague friendship match ==
=== Game log ===
September 20, 2025

TSG GhostHawks	106–97	Taipei Taishin Mars

Fu Jen Catholic University Chung Mei Auditorium, New Taipei City

September 24, 2025

Taoyuan Pauian Pilots	88–107	Taipei Taishin Mars

New Taipei City Linkou Civil Sports Center, New Taipei City

== Preseason ==
=== Game log ===
2025 preseason game log
Total: 1–1 (home: 0–1; road: 1–0)
Preseason : 1–1 (home: 0–1; road: 1–0)

Game	Date	Team	Score	High points	High rebounds	High assists	Location Attendance	Record
1	October 4	@ Kings	W 105–100	Stanton Kidd (21)	Jordy Tshimanga (13)	Ting Sheng-Ju (7)	Pingtung County Stadium	1–0
2	October 5	Aquas	L 79–93	Kenneth Chien (18)	Kenneth Chien (8); Chen Kuan-Chuan (8)	Ting Sheng-Ju (2); Samuel Manu (2); Kenneth Chien (2)	Pingtung County Stadium	1–1

Color： Win Lose
Schedule

== Regular season ==
=== Standings ===
Pos	Team	Pld	W	L	PCT	GB	Qualification
1	Taoyuan Taiwan Beer Leopards	36	23	13	.639	—	Advance to semifinals
2	Formosa Dreamers	36	22	14	.611	1	Advance to semifinals
3	Hsinchu Toplus Lioneers	36	22	14	.611	1	Advance to semifinals
4	New Taipei CTBC DEA	36	20	16	.556	3	Advance to play-in
5	New Taipei Kings	36	19	17	.528	4	Advance to play-in
6	Taipei Taishin Mars	36	11	25	.306	12	
7	Kaohsiung Aquas	36	9	27	.250	14	

Source: TPBL

=== Game log ===
2025–26 regular season game log
Total: 11–25 (home: 4–14; road: 7–11)
October : 1–1 (home: 0–0; road: 1–1)

Game	Date	Team	Score	High points	High rebounds	High assists	Location Attendance	Record
1	October 19	@ Kings	W 123–120 (OT)	Zach Lofton (41)	Jordy Tshimanga (10)	Zach Lofton (14)	Xinzhuang Gymnasium; 3,650	1–0
2	October 25	@ DEA	L 78–91	Zach Lofton (25)	Jordy Tshimanga (16)	Zach Lofton (4)	Xinzhuang Gymnasium; 5,851	1–1

November : 2–3 (home: 1–1; road: 1–2)

Game	Date	Team	Score	High points	High rebounds	High assists	Location Attendance	Record
3	November 1	@ Aquas	W 110–105	Zach Lofton (22); Stanton Kidd (22)	Jordy Tshimanga (16)	Zach Lofton (7)	Kaohsiung Arena; 3,657	2–1
4	November 8	@ Leopards	L 102–122	Zach Lofton (31)	Darral Willis (13)	Zach Lofton (5)	Taoyuan Arena; 6,023	2–2
5	November 15	Kings	W 97–87	Zach Lofton (28)	Jordy Tshimanga (15)	Kenneth Chien (4)	Taipei Heping Basketball Gymnasium; 5,500	3–2
6	November 16	Leopards	L 102–112	Stanton Kidd (23)	Jordy Tshimanga (17)	Zach Lofton (6)	Taipei Heping Basketball Gymnasium; 4,336	3–3
7	November 23	@ Dreamers	L 117–128	Zach Lofton (29)	Darral Willis (14)	Ting Sheng-Ju (3)	Taichung Intercontinental Basketball Stadium; 3,000	3–4

December : 3–2 (home: 2–1; road: 1–1)

Game	Date	Team	Score	High points	High rebounds	High assists	Location Attendance	Record
8	December 3	Lioneers	W 100–98	Darral Willis (29)	Darral Willis (15)	Xie Ming-Jun (4)	Taipei Heping Basketball Gymnasium; 3,158	4–4
9	December 6	DEA	L 104–108	Stanton Kidd (24)	Darral Willis (10)	Ting Sheng-Ju (8)	Taipei Heping Basketball Gymnasium; 5,169	4–5
10	December 7	Aquas	W 96–91 (OT)	Darral Willis (39)	Darral Willis (20)	Ting Sheng-Ju (9)	Taipei Heping Basketball Gymnasium; 4,086	5–5
11	December 21	@ Lioneers	W 94–83	Stanton Kidd (29)	Darral Willis (22)	Ting Sheng-Ju (10)	Hsinchu County Stadium; 4,508	6–5
12	December 27	@ Dreamers	L 98–108	Darral Willis (35)	Darral Willis (17)	Ting Sheng-Ju (13)	Taichung Intercontinental Basketball Stadium; 3,000	6–6

January : 2–4 (home: 1–3; road: 1–1)

Game	Date	Team	Score	High points	High rebounds	High assists	Location Attendance	Record
13	January 7	@ Aquas	L 103–108	Darral Willis (25); Stanton Kidd (25)	Darral Willis (20)	Ting Sheng-Ju (8)	Kaohsiung Arena; 2,815	6–7
14	January 10	Dreamers	L 91–110	Diamond Stone (27)	Diamond Stone (9)	Ting Sheng-Ju (6)	Taipei Heping Basketball Gymnasium; 5,162	6–8
15	January 11	Leopards	W 114–108	Diamond Stone (28)	Diamond Stone (12)	Ting Sheng-Ju (8)	Taipei Heping Basketball Gymnasium; 4,071	7–8
16	January 17	DEA	L 79–95	Stanton Kidd (24)	Kenneth Chien (6); Diamond Stone (6)	Stanton Kidd (7)	Taipei Heping Basketball Gymnasium; 4,550	7–9
17	January 18	Lioneers	L 98–101	Makur Maker (25)	Stanton Kidd (14)	Ting Sheng-Ju (6)	Taipei Heping Basketball Gymnasium; 4,075	7–10
18	January 25	@ DEA	W 112–104	Makur Maker (32)	Makur Maker (11)	Ting Sheng-Ju (10)	Xinzhuang Gymnasium; 4,165	8–10

February : 0–5 (home: 0–3; road: 0–2)

Game	Date	Team	Score	High points	High rebounds	High assists	Location Attendance	Record
19	February 1	@ Leopards	L 87–98	Stanton Kidd (19)	Makur Maker (20)	Ting Sheng-Ju (4); Samuel Manu (4)	Taoyuan City Zhongli Civil Sports Center; 2,000	8–11
20	February 7	Kings	L 96–98	Makur Maker (48)	Makur Maker (16)	Ting Sheng-Ju (10)	Taipei Heping Basketball Gymnasium; 5,176	8–12
21	February 8	Dreamers	L 91–104	Makur Maker (34)	Makur Maker (22)	Ting Sheng-Ju (8)	Taipei Heping Basketball Gymnasium; 4,520	8–13
22	February 11	Aquas	L 90–104	Ting Sheng-Ju (29)	Samuel Manu (5); Huang Tsung-Han (5)	Ting Sheng-Ju (5)	Taipei Heping Basketball Gymnasium; 3,291	8–14
23	February 14	@ Kings	L 95–116	Huang Tsung-Han (22)	Samuel Manu (12)	Samuel Manu (4); Xie Ming-Jun (4)	Xinzhuang Gymnasium; 3,833	8–15

March : 1–5 (home: 0–4; road: 1–1)

Game	Date	Team	Score	High points	High rebounds	High assists	Location Attendance	Record
24	March 6	@ Kings	L 90–93	Youssou Ndoye (19)	Youssou Ndoye (17)	Ting Sheng-Ju (8)	Xinzhuang Gymnasium; 3,716	8–16
25	March 11	@ Lioneers	W 102–94	Darral Willis (24)	Darral Willis (11); Youssou Ndoye (11)	Ting Sheng-Ju (9)	Hsinchu County Stadium; 3,411	9–16
26	March 21	Leopards	L 73–99	Darral Willis (17)	Youssou Ndoye (16)	Ting Sheng-Ju (9)	Taipei Heping Basketball Gymnasium; 5,076	9–17
27	March 22	Dreamers	L 96–118	Darral Willis (29)	Darral Willis (16)	Makur Maker (6)	Taipei Heping Basketball Gymnasium; 3,984	9–18
28	March 28	Aquas	L 104–112	Makur Maker (26)	Darral Willis (13)	Ting Sheng-Ju (6); Samuel Manu (6)	Taipei Heping Basketball Gymnasium; 4,658	9–19
29	March 29	Kings	L 102–116	Makur Maker (39)	Makur Maker (11)	Ting Sheng-Ju (8)	Taipei Heping Basketball Gymnasium; 4,395	9–20

April : 2–4 (home: 0–2; road: 2–2)

Game	Date	Team	Score	High points	High rebounds	High assists	Location Attendance	Record
30	April 1	@ DEA	W 91–89	Darral Willis (28)	Darral Willis (18)	Ting Sheng-Ju (10)	Xinzhuang Gymnasium; 3,092	10–20
31	April 5	@ Leopards	L 96–107	Makur Maker (29)	Makur Maker (17)	Ting Sheng-Ju (6); Youssou Ndoye (6)	Taoyuan City Zhongli Civil Sports Center; 2,000	10–21
32	April 12	@ Aquas	W 104–93	Youssou Ndoye (37)	Youssou Ndoye (23)	Ting Sheng-Ju (16)	Kaohsiung Arena; 3,188	11–21
33	April 18	@ Dreamers	L 66–99	Youssou Ndoye (16)	Youssou Ndoye (15)	Xie Ming-Jun (4)	Taichung Intercontinental Basketball Stadium; 3,000	11–22
34	April 25	Lioneers	L 86–104	Youssou Ndoye (22)	Youssou Ndoye (10)	Ting Sheng-Ju (13)	Taipei Heping Basketball Gymnasium; 4,653	11–23
35	April 26	DEA	L 103–111	Ting Sheng-Ju (34)	Youssou Ndoye (16)	Ting Sheng-Ju (11)	Taipei Heping Basketball Gymnasium; 4,022	11–24

May : 0–1 (home: 0–0; road: 0–1)

Game	Date	Team	Score	High points	High rebounds	High assists	Location Attendance	Record
36	May 2	@ Lioneers	L 73–96	Youssou Ndoye (19)	Youssou Ndoye (16)	Michael Frazier (4); Wei Peng-Ho (4)	Hsinchu County Stadium; 5,050	11–25

Color： Win Lose
Schedule

== Player statistics ==
Legend
GP	Games played	MPG	Minutes per game	FG%	Field goal percentage
3P%	3-point field goal percentage	FT%	Free throw percentage	RPG	Rebounds per game
APG	Assists per game	SPG	Steals per game	BPG	Blocks per game
PPG	Points per game		Led the league

=== Regular season ===
Player	GP	MPG	PPG	FG%	3P%	FT%	RPG	APG	SPG	BPG
Zach Lofton^{‡}	9	34:16	25.0	44.6%	36.9%	75.0%	4.3	4.8	0.8	0.3
Ting Sheng-Ju	29	36:20	12.9	37.8%	36.8%	83.2%	3.3	7.7	1.3	0.0
Makur Maker^{≠}	11	39:10	26.2	42.1%	30.1%	82.4%	13.0	3.4	1.0	0.6
Wei Peng-Ho	24	7:43	1.6	22.6%	15.2%	64.3%	0.7	1.0	0.5	0.0
Chiang Chun	17	6:32	0.9	26.1%	25.0%	12.5%	0.7	0.3	0.3	0.1
Liu Yen-Ting	18	12:09	3.2	41.8%	28.6%	42.1%	2.7	0.4	0.4	0.1
Chen Wen-Hung	30	11:50	2.5	38.7%	31.4%	78.6%	0.9	0.4	0.3	0.0
Chang Chao-Chen	21	15:11	3.9	34.5%	32.1%	40.0%	1.5	0.7	0.6	0.1
Stanton Kidd^{‡}	17	33:59	21.3	41.4%	33.8%	72.8%	7.4	2.5	1.5	0.5
Huang Tsung-Han	31	23:21	8.2	39.1%	38.2%	80.0%	2.1	0.6	0.8	0.2
Michael Frazier^{≠}	4	22:37	7.0	31.4%	20.0%	57.1%	2.0	3.0	1.3	0.3
Xie Ming-Jun	32	17:48	4.5	39.6%	30.6%	64.7%	2.0	1.0	0.4	0.0
Sun Szu-Yao	6	2:35	0.0	0.0%	0.0%	0.0%	0.3	0.0	0.2	0.0
Darral Willis	18	32:17	23.1	47.5%	35.6%	76.7%	12.6	1.9	1.3	0.4
Kenneth Chien	34	28:53	9.1	48.5%	32.2%	54.5%	2.9	1.9	0.8	0.2
Chang Keng-Yu	2	3:55	0.0	0.0%	0.0%	0.0%	1.0	0.0	0.5	0.0
Jordy Tshimanga^{‡}	8	28:19	11.1	57.4%	0.0%	58.7%	12.8	0.9	1.8	1.3
Samuel Manu	29	32:35	10.9	41.0%	26.5%	65.1%	5.3	2.6	1.2	0.3
Diamond Stone^{≠‡}	8	25:02	15.1	43.8%	42.4%	71.9%	6.6	0.6	0.8	0.6
Youssou Ndoye^{≠}	13	32:01	14.6	52.3%	21.1%	59.5%	12.1	1.5	0.7	0.5
Su Yi-Chin	19	9:25	1.9	44.4%	40.0%	63.6%	0.9	0.8	0.5	0.2
Chen Kuan-Chuan	20	9:32	2.1	41.9%	30.0%	75.0%	1.1	0.5	0.3	0.2

^{‡} Left during the season
^{≠} Acquired during the season

- Reference：

== Transactions ==
=== Overview ===
Players added

Via draft

- Wei Peng-Ho
- Xie Ming-Jun

Via free agency

- Michael Frazier
- Stanton Kidd
- Liu Yen-Ting
- Zach Lofton
- Makur Maker
- Youssou Ndoye
- Diamond Stone
- Sun Szu-Yao
- Jordy Tshimanga
- Darral Willis
Players lost

Via trade

- Wang Lu-Hsiang

Via free agency

- Jeantal Cylla
- Micheal Eric
- Lin Yi-Huei
- Ray McCallum
- Malcolm Miller
- Adrien Moerman
- Tsao Xun-Xiang

Waived

- Stanton Kidd
- Zach Lofton
- Diamond Stone
- Jordy Tshimanga

=== Trades ===
Date	Trade		Ref.
July 11, 2025	To Taipei Taishin Mars: Cash considerations	To TSG GhostHawks: Wang Lu-Hsiang	

=== Free agency ===
==== Additions ====
Date	Player	Contract terms	Former team	Ref.
August 14, 2025	Darral Willis	—N/a	(Greece) Aris	
August 20, 2025	Xie Ming-Jun	—N/a	(United States) Southern Coast Academy	
August 20, 2025	Wei Peng-Ho	—N/a	(Taiwan) NTNU	
August 21, 2025	Liu Yen-Ting	—N/a	(Taiwan) Kaohsiung Steelers	
September 3, 2025	Jordy Tshimanga	—N/a	(Canada) Winnipeg Sea Bears	
September 8, 2025	Stanton Kidd	—N/a	(Japan) Sendai 89ers	
September 10, 2025	Zach Lofton	—N/a	(Lebanon) Sagesse	
October 9, 2025	Sun Szu-Yao	—N/a	(Japan) Kanazawa Samuraiz	
December 16, 2025	Diamond Stone	—N/a	(Israel) Maccabi Kiryat Gat	
January 16, 2026	Makur Maker	—N/a	(Lebanon) Sagesse	
February 4, 2026	Michael Frazier	—N/a	(Iran) Palayesh Naft Abadan	
March 4, 2026	Youssou Ndoye	—N/a	(Tanzania) Dar City	

==== Subtractions ====
Date	Player	Reason	New team	Ref.
June 18, 2025	Jeantal Cylla	Contract expired	(China) Hubei Wenlv	
June 27, 2025	Micheal Eric	Contract expired	(South Korea) Changwon LG Sakers	
June 30, 2025	Lin Yi-Huei	Contract expired	—N/a	
June 30, 2025	Tsao Xun-Xiang	Contract expired	Taoyuan Taiwan Beer Leopards	
August 20, 2025	Malcolm Miller	Contract expired	Taoyuan Taiwan Beer Leopards	
September 10, 2025	Ray McCallum	Contract expired	(China) Hefei Storm	
September 10, 2025	Adrien Moerman	Contract expired	(France) Chorale Roanne	
December 24, 2025	Zach Lofton	Contract terminated	(Libya) Al Ittihad Tripoli	
January 16, 2026	Jordy Tshimanga	Contract terminated	(Mongolia) Ulaanbaatar Xac Broncos	
February 27, 2026	Diamond Stone	Contract terminated	(Venezuela) Marinos de Anzoátegui	
March 4, 2026	Stanton Kidd	Contract terminated	(China) Changsha Yongsheng	

== Awards ==
=== Yearly awards ===
Recipient	Award	Ref.
Ting Sheng-Ju	Assists Leader	
Ting Sheng-Ju	All-TPBL Second Team	
Samuel Manu	Dunk of the Year	
Samuel Manu	All-Defensive Second Team	

=== Player of the Week ===
Week	Recipient	Award	Ref.
8	Darral Willis	Week 8 Player of the Week	
15	Makur Maker	Week 15 Player of the Week	

=== Player of the Month ===
Month	Recipient	Award	Ref.
January & February	Makur Maker	January & February Player of the Month (import)	
