= 2025–26 Formosa Dreamers season =

Taiwanese professional basketball season

- TPBL champions
- President: Tien Lei
- General Manager: Han Chun-Kai
- Head Coach: Douglas Creighton
- Arena: Taichung Intercontinental Basketball Stadium

TPBL results
- Record: 22–14 (61.1%)
- Place: 2nd
- Playoffs finish: Champions (1st title) (defeated Kings, 4–3)

Player records
- Points: Aric Holman 17.9
- Rebounds: Aric Holman 11.3
- Assists: Chiang Yu-An 4.2

The 2025–26 Formosa Dreamers season was the franchise's ninth season, its second season in the Taiwan Professional Basketball League (TPBL).

On July 1, 2025, the Dreamers named Jamie Pearlman as their associate head coach. On July 29, the Dreamers named Douglas Creighton, the captain of the Formosa Dreamers, as their new head coach.

== Draft ==
The Dreamers did not select any players in the 2025 TPBL draft.

== Roster ==
2025–26 Formosa Dreamers roster
Players
Coaches

Pos.	No.	Nat.	Name	Ht.	Wt.	Age	From
SG	0	(Taiwan)	Chen Jen-Jei	1.83 m (6 ft 0 in)	80 kg (176 lb)	28 – 16 September 1997	Grand View
SF	2	(Taiwan)	Ma Chien-Hao	2.01 m (6 ft 7 in)	90 kg (198 lb)	25 – 29 April 2001	Georgia State
SG	3	(Taiwan)	Chang Tsung-Hsien (C)	1.92 m (6 ft 4 in)	88 kg (194 lb)	37 – 27 December 1988	BYU–Hawaii
PG	9	(Taiwan)	Wu Chia-Chun	1.74 m (5 ft 9 in)	70 kg (154 lb)	32 – 3 March 1994	NTSU
PG	11	(Taiwan)	Lin Chun-Chi	1.75 m (5 ft 9 in)	70 kg (154 lb)	28 – 29 January 1998	UCH
SG	20	(Taiwan)	Chien Wei-Ju	1.86 m (6 ft 1 in)	85 kg (187 lb)	34 – 20 January 1992	NTNU
SF	24	(United States) (Taiwan)	Randall Walko	1.96 m (6 ft 5 in)	93 kg (205 lb)	27 – 21 September 1998	TCNJ
C	26	(Taiwan)	Lee Te-Wei	2.00 m (6 ft 7 in)	105 kg (231 lb)	34 – 15 October 1991	CCUT
SF	27	(Taiwan)	Shih Cheng-Ping	1.90 m (6 ft 3 in)	80 kg (176 lb)	26 – 1 October 1999	ISU
SG	28	(Taiwan)	Lu Kuan-Liang	1.85 m (6 ft 1 in)	90 kg (198 lb)	35 – 9 April 1991	NTUA
PF	33	(United States)	Trey Thompkins (I)	2.08 m (6 ft 10 in)	105 kg (231 lb)	36 – 29 May 1990	Georgia
C	34	(United States) (Taiwan)	Brandon Gilbeck (I)	2.13 m (7 ft 0 in)	107 kg (236 lb)	29 – 9 December 1996	Western Illinois
PF	35	(United States)	Aric Holman (I)	2.08 m (6 ft 10 in)	100 kg (220 lb)	28 – 11 July 1997	Mississippi State
PG	41	(Taiwan)	Chiang Yu-An	1.74 m (5 ft 9 in)	75 kg (165 lb)	34 – 4 August 1991	NTUS
PF	50	(Ghana)	Ben Bentil (I)	2.04 m (6 ft 8 in)	107 kg (236 lb)	31 – 29 March 1995	Providence
C	88	(Taiwan)	Chou Po-Chen	1.98 m (6 ft 6 in)	98 kg (216 lb)	35 – 8 August 1990	NTNU

Head coach

- (Taiwan) (United States) Douglas Creighton

Assistant coach(es)

- (Australia) Jamie Pearlman (associate HC)
- (Taiwan) Lai Po-Lin
- (South Korea) (Australia) Daniel Kim

Athletic trainer(s)

- (Taiwan) Hou Yao-Hsin
- (Taiwan) Chen Tzu-Chieh

Team manager

- (Taiwan) Han Chun-Kai

Legend

- (C) Team captain
- (I) Import player
- Injured

- Roster
Updated: April 18, 2026

== Akita Northern Happinets Preseason Game 2025-26 Season ==
September 5, 2025
19:05 (UTC+9)

Formosa Dreamers	108–94	Akita Northern Happinets

CNA Arena Akita, Akita

== International friendship match ==
September 9, 2025
14:30 (UTC+8)

Seoul SK Knights	71–96	Formosa Dreamers

Taichung Intercontinental Basketball Stadium, Taichung City

== Douglas Creighton Retirement Game ==
Recap

September 20, 2025
14:30 (UTC+8)

Taoyuan Pauian Pilots	68–68	Formosa Dreamers

Taichung Intercontinental Basketball Stadium, Taichung City

== Preseason ==
=== Game log ===
2025 preseason game log
Total: 2–0 (home: 1–0; road: 1–0)
Preseason : 2–0 (home: 1–0; road: 1–0)

Game	Date	Team	Score	High points	High rebounds	High assists	Location Attendance	Record
1	October 3	DEA	W 111–109	Brandon Gilbeck (25)	Brandon Gilbeck (13)	Aric Holman (6)	Pingtung County Stadium	1–0
2	October 4	@ Lioneers	W 94–88	Chang Tsung-Hsien (21); Aric Holman (21)	Brandon Gilbeck (15)	Aric Holman (4)	Pingtung County Stadium	2–0

Color： Win Lose
Schedule

== Regular season ==
=== Standings ===
Pos	Team	Pld	W	L	PCT	GB	Qualification
1	Taoyuan Taiwan Beer Leopards	36	23	13	.639	—	Advance to semifinals
2	Formosa Dreamers	36	22	14	.611	1	Advance to semifinals
3	Hsinchu Toplus Lioneers	36	22	14	.611	1	Advance to semifinals
4	New Taipei CTBC DEA	36	20	16	.556	3	Advance to play-in
5	New Taipei Kings	36	19	17	.528	4	Advance to play-in
6	Taipei Taishin Mars	36	11	25	.306	12	
7	Kaohsiung Aquas	36	9	27	.250	14	

Source: TPBL

=== Game log ===
2025–26 regular season game log
Total: 22–14 (home: 13–5; road: 9–9)
October : 1–3 (home: 0–2; road: 1–1)

Game	Date	Team	Score	High points	High rebounds	High assists	Location Attendance	Record
1	October 12	@ Kings	L 93–112	Aric Holman (32)	Aric Holman (16)	Aric Holman (3); Lin Chun-Chi (3); Chien Wei-Ju (3)	Xinzhuang Gymnasium; 4,047	0–1
2	October 18	Aquas	L 101–106	James Ennis (26)	Brandon Gilbeck (8)	Aric Holman (5)	Taichung Intercontinental Basketball Stadium; 2,616	0–2
3	October 19	Leopards	L 83–104	Lin Chun-Chi (16)	Brandon Gilbeck (11)	Chiang Yu-An (4); James Ennis (4)	Taichung Intercontinental Basketball Stadium; 2,637	0–3
4	October 29	@ Aquas	W 99–86	Chang Tsung-Hsien (21); James Ennis (21)	Aric Holman (10)	Chiang Yu-An (6)	Kaohsiung Arena; 2,861	1–3

November : 4–2 (home: 4–0; road: 0–2)

Game	Date	Team	Score	High points	High rebounds	High assists	Location Attendance	Record
5	November 1	@ DEA	L 91–99	James Ennis (22)	James Ennis (14)	James Ennis (5)	Xinzhuang Gymnasium; 4,034	1–4
6	November 5	Lioneers	W 82–81	Aric Holman (18)	Trey Thompkins (12)	James Ennis (4)	Taichung Intercontinental Basketball Stadium; 2,109	2–4
7	November 7	DEA	W 92–87	Ma Chien-Hao (17)	Brandon Gilbeck (14)	Chiang Yu-An (5)	Taichung Intercontinental Basketball Stadium; 2,280	3–4
8	November 12	@ Kings	L 91–94	Chiang Yu-An (17); Brandon Gilbeck (17)	James Ennis (14)	Ma Chien-Hao (3); Chiang Yu-An (3); James Ennis (3); Trey Thompkins (3); Lin Chun-Chi (3)	Xinzhuang Gymnasium; 3,334	3–5
9	November 22	Lioneers	W 113–98	Aric Holman (20)	James Ennis (12)	Aric Holman (6)	Taichung Intercontinental Basketball Stadium; 3,000	4–5
10	November 23	Mars	W 128–117	Ma Chien-Hao (27)	Aric Holman (12)	Trey Thompkins (6); Lin Chun-Chi (6)	Taichung Intercontinental Basketball Stadium; 3,000	5–5

December : 2–3 (home: 1–1; road: 1–2)

Game	Date	Team	Score	High points	High rebounds	High assists	Location Attendance	Record
11	December 7	@ Leopards	L 92–105	Aric Holman (22)	Aric Holman (16)	James Ennis (4)	Taoyuan Arena; 5,793	5–6
12	December 14	@ Aquas	W 99–73	Brandon Gilbeck (20)	Brandon Gilbeck (11); Trey Thompkins (11); Aric Holman (11)	Aric Holman (5)	Kaohsiung Arena; 5,016	6–6
13	December 20	@ Lioneers	L 85–90	Aric Holman (19)	Aric Holman (18)	Lu Kuan-Liang (5); Trey Thompkins (5)	Hsinchu County Stadium; 4,817	6–7
14	December 27	Mars	W 108–98	Aric Holman (22)	Aric Holman (20)	Chiang Yu-An (8)	Taichung Intercontinental Basketball Stadium; 3,000	7–7
15	December 28	DEA	L 104–118	Aric Holman (29)	Brandon Gilbeck (15)	Aric Holman (5)	Taichung Intercontinental Basketball Stadium; 3,000	7–8

January : 3–3 (home: 1–2; road: 2–1)

Game	Date	Team	Score	High points	High rebounds	High assists	Location Attendance	Record
16	January 4	@ DEA	W 122–115	Chang Tsung-Hsien (25)	Aric Holman (10)	Chiang Yu-An (8)	Xinzhuang Gymnasium; 4,091	8–8
17	January 10	@ Mars	W 110–91	Ma Chien-Hao (20)	Trey Thompkins (14)	Trey Thompkins (4); Lin Chun-Chi (4)	Taipei Heping Basketball Gymnasium; 5,162	9–8
18	January 17	Kings	W 116–96	Ben Bentil (29)	Brandon Gilbeck (12); Ben Bentil (12)	Chiang Yu-An (7)	Taichung Intercontinental Basketball Stadium; 3,000	10–8
19	January 18	Leopards	L 91–98	Ma Chien-Hao (23)	Brandon Gilbeck (17)	Chiang Yu-An (4)	Taichung Intercontinental Basketball Stadium; 3,000	10–9
20	January 24	@ Lioneers	L 91–95	Lin Chun-Chi (20)	Ben Bentil (13)	Lin Chun-Chi (7)	Hsinchu County Stadium; 5,897	10–10
21	January 31	Kings	L 97–114	Ben Bentil (20)	Ben Bentil (15)	Chiang Yu-An (5)	Taichung Intercontinental Basketball Stadium; 2,778	10–11

February : 3–0 (home: 1–0; road: 2–0)

Game	Date	Team	Score	High points	High rebounds	High assists	Location Attendance	Record
22	February 1	Aquas	W 96–93	Ben Bentil (23)	Brandon Gilbeck (12); Julian Boyd (12)	Chiang Yu-An (8)	Taichung Intercontinental Basketball Stadium; 2,899	11–11
23	February 8	@ Mars	W 104–91	Ben Bentil (27)	Ben Bentil (20)	Chiang Yu-An (8)	Taipei Heping Basketball Gymnasium; 4,520	12–11
24	February 14	@ Leopards	W 100–98	Ben Bentil (20)	Aric Holman (10)	Lin Chun-Chi (5); Aric Holman (5)	Taoyuan City Zhongli Civil Sports Center; 2,000	13–11

March : 6–0 (home: 4–0; road: 2–0)

Game	Date	Team	Score	High points	High rebounds	High assists	Location Attendance	Record
25	March 7	@ Aquas	W 107–97	Trey Thompkins (22); Ben Bentil (22)	Aric Holman (14)	Chiang Yu-An (4); Aric Holman (4)	Kaohsiung Arena; 6,051	14–11
26	March 14	DEA	W 100–91	Randall Walko (20); Aric Holman (20)	Ben Bentil (9)	Chiang Yu-An (6)	Taichung Intercontinental Basketball Stadium; 2,290	15–11
27	March 15	Leopards	W 111–84	Ben Bentil (20)	Trey Thompkins (13)	Chiang Yu-An (6)	Taichung Intercontinental Basketball Stadium; 2,556	16–11
28	March 22	@ Mars	W 118–96	Ben Bentil (32)	Ben Bentil (14)	Aric Holman (8)	Taipei Heping Basketball Gymnasium; 3,984	17–11
29	March 25	Aquas	W 96–90	Lin Chun-Chi (20)	Aric Holman (13)	Lin Chun-Chi (5)	Taichung Intercontinental Basketball Stadium; 3,000	18–11
30	March 27	Kings	W 107–90	Trey Thompkins (23)	Aric Holman (9)	Chiang Yu-An (7)	Taichung Intercontinental Basketball Stadium; 3,000	19–11

April : 3–3 (home: 2–0; road: 1–3)

Game	Date	Team	Score	High points	High rebounds	High assists	Location Attendance	Record
31	April 4	@ DEA	L 104–108	Chiang Yu-An (29)	Aric Holman (10)	Chang Tsung-Hsien (7)	Xinzhuang Gymnasium; 4,880	19–12
32	April 12	@ Lioneers	W 94–85	Aric Holman (32)	Aric Holman (16)	Lin Chun-Chi (7)	Hsinchu County Stadium; 5,541	20–12
33	April 18	Mars	W 99–66	Aric Holman (19)	Brandon Gilbeck (10); Aric Holman (10)	Chiang Yu-An (6); Lin Chun-Chi (6)	Taichung Intercontinental Basketball Stadium; 3,000	21–12
34	April 19	Lioneers	W 92–86	Aric Holman (31)	Ben Bentil (10)	Ben Bentil (10)	Taichung Intercontinental Basketball Stadium; 3,000	22–12
35	April 24	@ Kings	L 99–105	Brandon Gilbeck (31)	Ben Bentil (14)	Ben Bentil (5)	Xinzhuang Gymnasium; 3,723	22–13
36	April 26	@ Leopards	L 100–104	Aric Holman (24)	Aric Holman (17)	Trey Thompkins (5)	Taoyuan Arena; 6,033	22–14

Color： Win Lose
Schedule

== Playoffs ==
=== Game log ===
2026 playoffs game log
Total: 7–4 (home: 4–2; road: 3–2)
Semifinals : 3–1 (home: 1–1; road: 2–0)

Game	Date	Team	Score	High points	High rebounds	High assists	Location Attendance	Series
1	May 9	Lioneers	L 94–97	Ben Bentil (27)	Ben Bentil (9)	Chiang Yu-An (5)	Taichung Intercontinental Basketball Stadium; 3,000	0–1
2	May 12	Lioneers	W 83–61	Ma Chien-Hao (23)	Trey Thompkins (13); Ben Bentil (13)	Chiang Yu-An (5)	Taichung Intercontinental Basketball Stadium; 3,000	1–1
3	May 14	@ Lioneers	W 114–106	Ben Bentil (33)	Aric Holman (11)	Ben Bentil (8)	Hsinchu County Stadium; 5,127	2–1
4	May 16	@ Lioneers	W 104–93	Chiang Yu-An (25)	Ben Bentil (13)	Chiang Yu-An (5)	Hsinchu County Stadium; 6,055	3–1

Finals : 4–3 (home: 3–1; road: 1–2)

Game	Date	Team	Score	High points	High rebounds	High assists	Location Attendance	Series
1	May 24	Kings	L 90–91	Aric Holman (24)	Ben Bentil (17)	Ben Bentil (5)	Taichung Intercontinental Basketball Stadium; 3,000	0–1
2	May 26	Kings	W 99–90	Aric Holman (22)	Ben Bentil (12)	Ben Bentil (9)	Taichung Intercontinental Basketball Stadium; 3,000	1–1
3	May 29	@ Kings	L 84–109	Trey Thompkins (19)	Trey Thompkins (10)	Chiang Yu-An (4); Ben Bentil (4)	Xinzhuang Gymnasium; 6,187	1–2
4	May 31	@ Kings	L 93–96	Aric Holman (23)	Brandon Gilbeck (13)	Ben Bentil (8)	Xinzhuang Gymnasium; 6,800	1–3
5	June 2	Kings	W 105–69	Trey Thompkins (20)	Brandon Gilbeck (9)	Ben Bentil (5)	Taichung Intercontinental Basketball Stadium; 3,000	2–3
6	June 4	@ Kings	W 91–88	Trey Thompkins (24)	Brandon Gilbeck (14)	Ben Bentil (4)	Xinzhuang Gymnasium; 6,648	3–3
7	June 6	Kings	W 90–78	Ben Bentil (29)	Ben Bentil (13)	Chiang Yu-An (4); Lin Chun-Chi (4)	Taichung Intercontinental Basketball Stadium; 3,000	4–3

Color： Win Lose
Schedule

== Player statistics ==
Legend
GP	Games played	MPG	Minutes per game	FG%	Field goal percentage
3P%	3-point field goal percentage	FT%	Free throw percentage	RPG	Rebounds per game
APG	Assists per game	SPG	Steals per game	BPG	Blocks per game
PPG	Points per game		Led the league		Finals MVP

=== Regular season ===
Player	GP	MPG	PPG	FG%	3P%	FT%	RPG	APG	SPG	BPG
Chen Jen-Jei	8	11:21	4.3	36.8%	25.0%	0.0%	2.6	1.0	0.3	0.0
Ma Chien-Hao	23	25:22	11.4	38.7%	33.6%	76.9%	3.7	1.9	0.9	0.4
Chang Tsung-Hsien	31	27:44	11.0	42.9%	33.3%	71.9%	2.6	2.0	1.1	0.0
Wu Chia-Chun	19	7:31	0.8	15.8%	7.7%	60.0%	0.6	1.1	0.4	0.0
Lin Chun-Chi	29	21:31	11.1	46.0%	35.6%	84.9%	1.9	3.4	0.5	0.0
Chien Wei-Ju	20	9:21	1.4	29.3%	18.2%	33.3%	1.0	0.5	0.6	0.1
James Ennis^{‡}	9	30:09	16.7	49.0%	26.8%	74.0%	9.3	3.4	1.6	0.6
Randall Walko	35	28:40	9.6	40.7%	39.4%	78.7%	3.6	1.4	0.5	0.2
Lee Te-Wei	17	3:55	0.5	23.5%	0.0%	50.0%	0.6	0.0	0.1	0.1
Shih Cheng-Ping	11	2:48	0.8	50.0%	33.3%	0.0%	0.3	0.2	0.2	0.0
Lu Kuan-Liang	31	15:09	3.8	41.1%	35.7%	71.4%	1.2	1.0	0.4	0.0
Trey Thompkins	20	32:52	16.6	47.8%	36.0%	86.3%	9.4	3.1	1.8	0.7
Brandon Gilbeck	23	29:31	12.0	59.6%	0.0%	69.0%	10.0	0.7	0.8	2.0
Aric Holman	28	30:57	17.9	45.9%	33.7%	73.6%	11.3	3.3	1.1	1.6
Chiang Yu-An	36	31:33	10.8	41.2%	35.6%	73.6%	3.8	4.2	1.3	0.1
Julian Boyd^{≠‡}	9	27:25	15.4	53.3%	48.3%	50.0%	7.6	1.9	1.6	0.4
Ben Bentil^{≠}	18	33:57	18.9	42.6%	34.6%	71.6%	10.8	3.3	1.3	0.3
Chou Po-Chen	18	6:08	0.4	27.3%	0.0%	33.3%	0.8	0.1	0.1	0.0

^{‡} Left during the season
^{≠} Acquired during the season

=== Semifinals ===
Player	GP	MPG	PPG	FG%	3P%	FT%	RPG	APG	SPG	BPG
Chen Jen-Jei	3	2:18	0.0	0.0%	0.0%	0.0%	0.3	0.3	0.0	0.0
Ma Chien-Hao	4	21:36	11.0	44.1%	36.4%	75.0%	3.3	2.5	0.8	0.0
Chang Tsung-Hsien	4	26:09	8.8	48.5%	33.3%	50.0%	1.8	1.8	0.3	0.0
Wu Chia-Chun	3	5:39	3.0	20.0%	0.0%	87.5%	0.7	0.0	0.0	0.0
Lin Chun-Chi	2	18:36	7.0	38.5%	16.7%	75.0%	3.0	1.0	0.5	0.0
Chien Wei-Ju	1	2:09	0.0	0.0%	0.0%	0.0%	0.0	0.0	0.0	0.0
Randall Walko	4	27:44	7.0	34.5%	33.3%	50.0%	4.8	1.5	0.5	0.5
Lee Te-Wei	4	1:49	0.0	0.0%	0.0%	0.0%	0.5	0.0	0.0	0.0
Shih Cheng-Ping	Did not play									
Lu Kuan-Liang	4	17:01	3.8	45.5%	50.0%	100.0%	2.3	2.0	0.5	0.0
Trey Thompkins	2	27:03	7.5	31.6%	11.1%	100.0%	6.5	1.0	1.0	1.5
Brandon Gilbeck	2	25:51	11.5	56.3%	0.0%	55.6%	8.5	0.5	0.5	2.0
Aric Holman	4	30:39	14.3	48.9%	29.4%	80.0%	8.3	3.0	2.0	1.3
Chiang Yu-An	4	35:40	16.8	46.7%	36.8%	90.0%	3.3	5.3	2.5	0.0
Ben Bentil	4	36:29	22.0	46.0%	43.5%	74.1%	11.0	4.0	1.3	0.3
Chou Po-Chen	1	2:20	0.0	0.0%	0.0%	0.0%	0.0	0.0	0.0	0.0

=== Finals ===
Player	GP	MPG	PPG	FG%	3P%	FT%	RPG	APG	SPG	BPG
Chen Jen-Jei	2	3:51	1.5	25.0%	33.3%	0.0%	1.0	0.0	0.0	0.0
Ma Chien-Hao	7	21:29	5.4	30.0%	25.0%	72.7%	2.9	1.0	0.4	0.1
Chang Tsung-Hsien	7	28:39	8.1	33.8%	18.2%	81.8%	3.0	1.3	0.3	0.0
Wu Chia-Chun	2	3:31	0.0	0.0%	0.0%	0.0%	0.0	0.5	0.0	0.0
Lin Chun-Chi	7	18:36	9.6	48.9%	26.7%	94.4%	2.6	2.7	0.6	0.0
Chien Wei-Ju	2	1:58	1.5	50.0%	100.0%	0.0%	0.0	0.0	0.0	0.0
Randall Walko	7	30:00	9.6	38.9%	38.5%	93.8%	3.4	1.0	0.4	0.4
Lee Te-Wei	3	2:41	0.3	0.0%	0.0%	50.0%	0.7	0.3	0.0	0.0
Shih Cheng-Ping	Did not play									
Lu Kuan-Liang	7	11:19	1.9	33.3%	20.0%	100.0%	0.6	0.4	0.1	0.0
Trey Thompkins	5	30:31	17.4	47.8%	30.0%	93.3%	9.0	1.6	1.0	0.0
Brandon Gilbeck	5	30:53	12.8	68.6%	50.0%	60.9%	10.6	0.4	0.8	1.8
Aric Holman	4	29:38	20.3	43.3%	35.7%	86.7%	8.0	3.0	1.0	1.0
Chiang Yu-An	7	31:14	9.4	37.3%	24.3%	70.0%	3.4	4.0	1.0	0.3
Ben Bentil	7	32:41	15.0	35.2%	19.2%	80.9%	10.9	5.4	2.3	0.0
Chou Po-Chen	3	3:09	0.0	0.0%	0.0%	0.0%	0.0	0.0	0.0	0.0

- Reference：

== Transactions ==
=== Overview ===
Players added

Via free agency

- Ben Bentil
- Julian Boyd
- James Ennis
- Trey Thompkins
Players lost

Via free agency

- Beau Beech
- Markus Lončar
- Wang Chen-Yuan

Waived

- James Ennis

Retirement

- Julian Boyd
- Douglas Creighton

=== Free agency ===
==== Re-signed ====
Date	Player	Contract terms	Ref.
July 9, 2025	Randall Walko	—N/a	
July 11, 2025	Chou Po-Chen	—N/a	
July 16, 2025	Brandon Gilbeck	—N/a	
July 18, 2025	Aric Holman	—N/a	

==== Additions ====
Date	Player	Contract terms	Former team	Ref.
July 30, 2025	James Ennis	—N/a	(Japan) Kagoshima Rebnise	
August 5, 2025	Trey Thompkins	—N/a	(Spain) Básquet Coruña	
December 16, 2025	Julian Boyd	—N/a	(Taiwan) Taoyuan Pauian Pilots	
January 6, 2026	Ben Bentil	—N/a	(Turkey) Mersin MSK	

==== Subtractions ====
Date	Player	Reason	New team	Ref.
July 29, 2025	Douglas Creighton	Retirement	(Taiwan) Formosa Dreamers head coach	
August 5, 2025	Beau Beech	Contract expired	(Croatia) KK Zadar	
August 5, 2025	Markus Lončar	Contract expired	(Croatia) KK Cibona	
August 19, 2025	Wang Chen-Yuan	Contract expired	(Taiwan) Keelung Black Kites	
December 15, 2025	James Ennis	Contract terminated	(Venezuela) Piratas de La Guaira	
February 23, 2026	Julian Boyd	Retirement	—N/a	

== Awards ==
=== Yearly awards ===
Recipient	Award	Ref.
Brandon Gilbeck	Blocks Leader	
Brandon Gilbeck	Defensive Player of the Year	
Brandon Gilbeck	All-Defensive First Team	
Chiang Yu-An	All-TPBL Second Team	
Aric Holman	All-TPBL Second Team	
Yua Mikami	Most Popular Cheerleader of the Year	
Lin Chun-Chi	Sixth Man of the Year	

=== Player of the Week ===
Week	Recipient	Award	Ref.
17	Ben Bentil	Week 17 Player of the Week	
21	Ben Bentil	Week 21 Player of the Week	
24	Aric Holman	Week 24 Player of the Week	

=== Player of the Month ===
Month	Recipient	Award	Ref.
March	Ben Bentil	March Player of the Month (import)	
April & May	Aric Holman	April & May Player of the Month (import)	
