= Reid Travis =

American basketball player (born 1995)

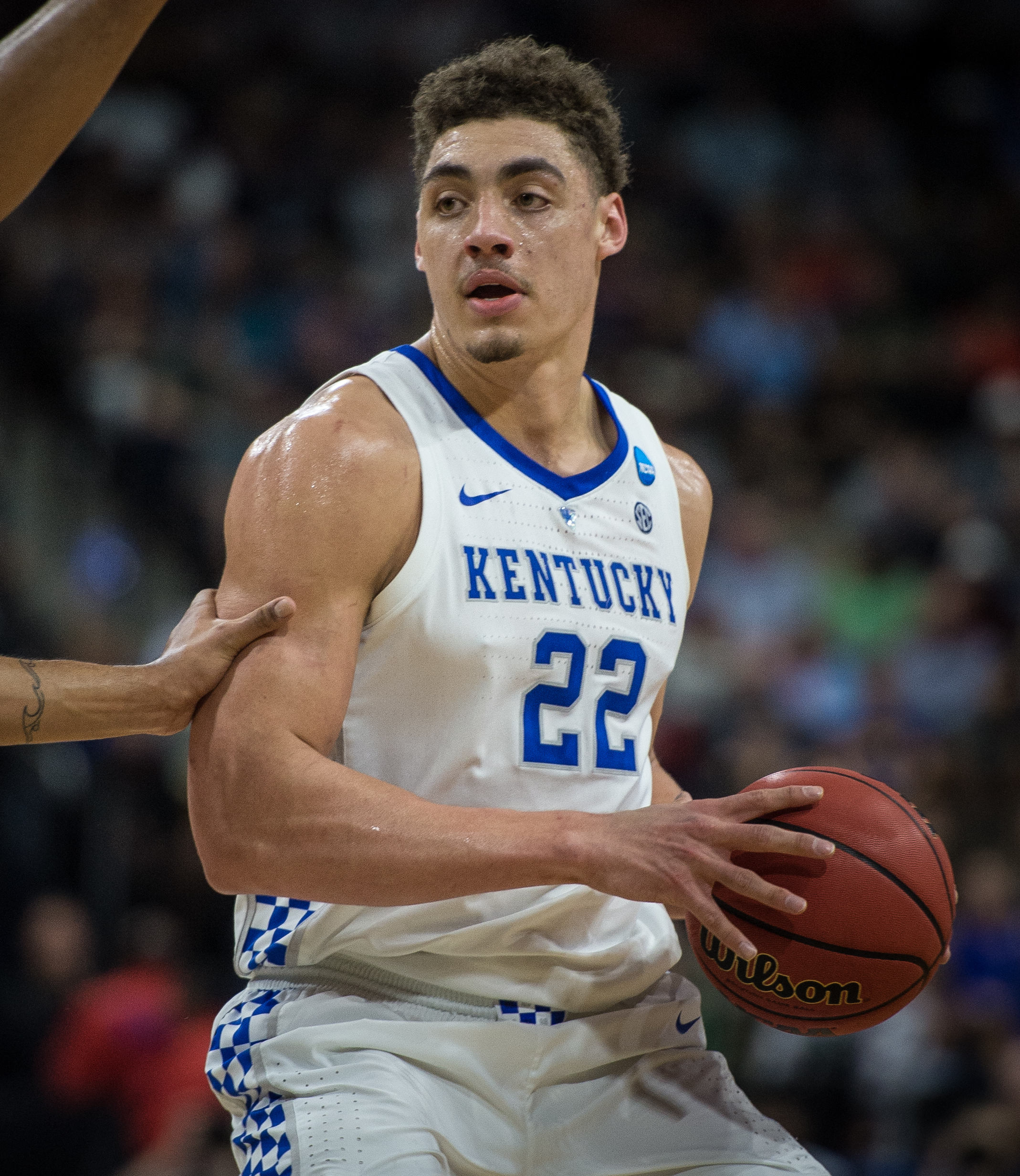
- Travis with the Kentucky Wildcats in 2019

No. 22 – Akita Northern Happinets
- Position: Power forward
- League: B.League

Personal information
- Born: November 25, 1995 (age 30) Minneapolis, Minnesota, U.S.
- Listed height: 6 ft 8 in (2.03 m)
- Listed weight: 245 lb (111 kg)

Career information
- High school: De La Salle (Minneapolis, Minnesota)
- College: Stanford (2014–2018); Kentucky (2018–2019)
- NBA draft: 2019: undrafted
- Playing career: 2019–present

Career history
- 2019–2020: Medi Bayreuth
- 2020–2023: Shimane Susanoo Magic
- 2023–2024: Indiana Mad Ants
- 2024: Levanga Hokkaido
- 2024–2025: Sun Rockers Shibuya
- 2025: Kaohsiung Aquas
- 2026–present: Akita Northern Happinets

Career highlights
- 2× First-team All-Pac-12 (2017, 2018); NIT champion (2015); McDonald's All-American (2014)
- Stats at NBA.com
- Stats at Basketball Reference

Reid Travis (born November 25, 1995) is an American professional basketball player for the Akita Northern Happinets of the B.League. He played college basketball for the Kentucky Wildcats. He began his college career with the Stanford Cardinal, where he was a two-time first-team all-conference selection in the Pac-12.

== High school career ==
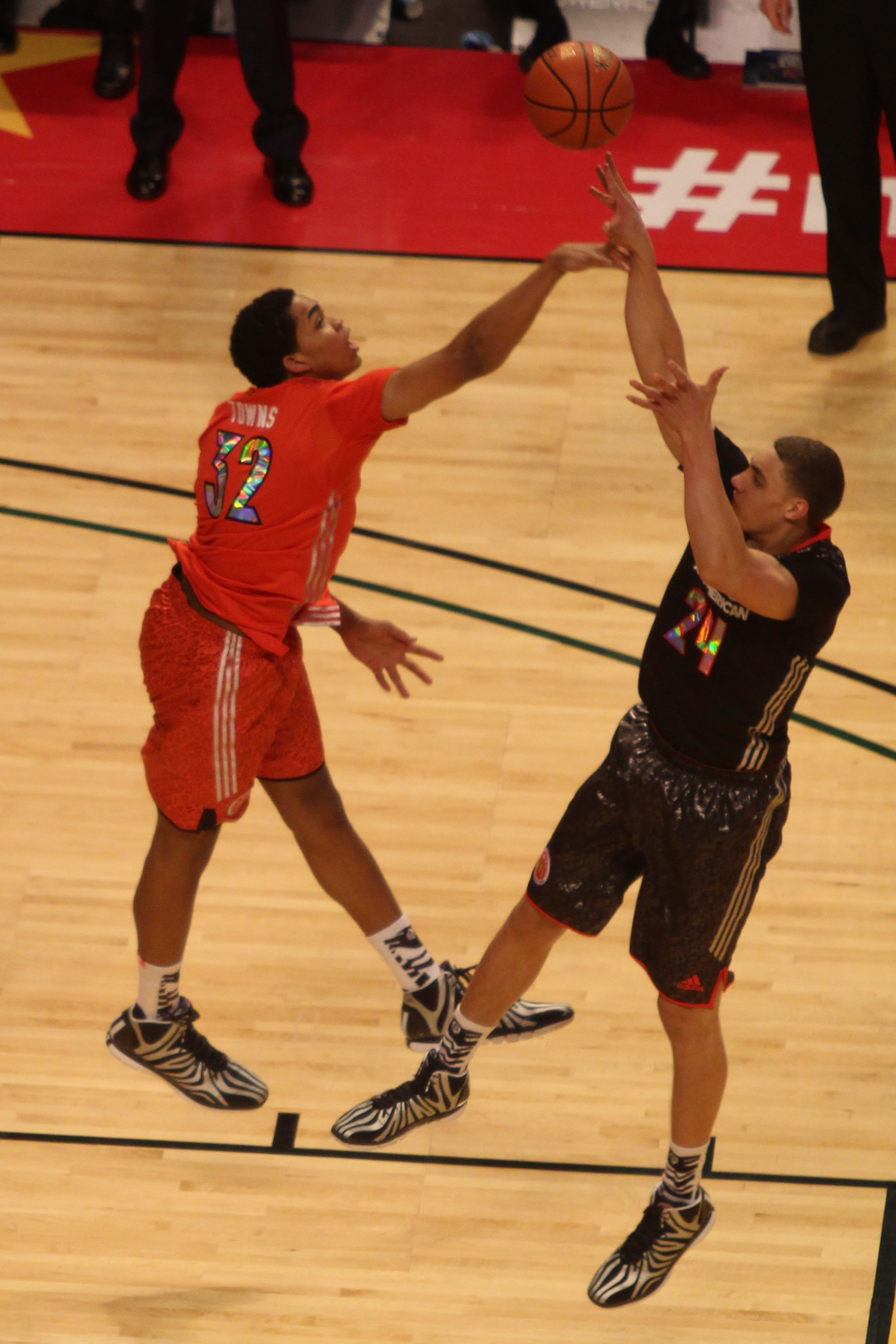
Reid shooting over Karl-Anthony Towns at the 2014 McDonald's All-American Game

During Reid's senior year, he led the Islanders to their third straight state title while averaging 26.1 points and 9 rebounds. He participated in the 2014 McDonald's All-American Game playing 14 minutes scoring 8 points with 5 rebounds helping the West win over the East 105–102.

Travis was ranked in the top 50 in nation's recruits in 2014. He was considering Minnesota, Duke, and Michigan State before choosing Stanford.

He also played football his first three years in high school before focusing on basketball his senior year.

College recruiting
Name	Hometown	School	Height	Weight	Commit date
Reid Travis; PF	Minneapolis, MN	De La Salle HS	6 ft 8 in (2.03 m)	240 lb (110 kg)	Nov 8, 2013
Reid Travis; PF	Recruit ratings: Scout: Rivals: 247Sports: ESPN:				
Overall recruit ranking: Scout: 48 Rivals: 36 ESPN: 27
Note: In many cases, Scout, Rivals, 247Sports, On3, and ESPN may conflict in their listings of height and weight.; In these cases, the average was taken. ESPN grades are on a 100-point scale.; Sources:

== College career ==
In Travis's freshman year, he played in 28 games and started in 12 of them. He averaged 6.2 points and 5.6 rebounds.

In his sophomore year, Travis started the first 8 games for the Cardinal at power forward, but suffered a season-ending stress fracture in his left leg prior to a game against Texas on December 19. He averaged 12.8 points and 7.1 rebounds in his abbreviated season. He applied for and was granted a medical redshirt in February.

In his third year, as a redshirt-sophomore, Travis started all 27 games; averaging 17.4 points and a career high 8.9 rebounds per game. At the end of the year, he was selected by Pac-12 coaches for the All-Pac-12 first team.

His fourth year, he started all 35 games; averaging 19.5 points and averaging 8.7 rebounds while shooting only .295% (18–61) from behind the arc. Travis received First team All-Pac-12 honors for the second straight year. He was also named First Team All-District 20 by the NABC and the District IX All-District Team by the USBWA. On December 17, he recorded his 1,000th point for the Cardinal against San Francisco where he scored 29 points, 8 rebounds, and shot 11–18 from the field. He was named Pac 12 player of the week on February 6 after scoring 33 points, including 23 in the first half, along with nine rebounds to lead Stanford to a 94–78 win over Washington.

Travis declared for the 2018 NBA draft, but did not sign with an agent; opting instead to return for his redshirt-senior year. On May 30, he announced he was withdrawing from the draft but transferring from Stanford. On June 20, 2018, Travis announced that he would transfer to and play for the University of Kentucky. In his only season at Kentucky, Travis averaged 11.2 points and 7.2 rebounds per game.

== Professional career ==
After going undrafted in the 2019 NBA draft, Travis joined the Atlanta Hawks for the 2019 NBA Summer League. On July 22, 2019, Travis signed his first professional contract with Medi Bayreuth of the Basketball Bundesliga. He averaged 9.8 points and 5.4 rebounds per game when the season was suspended.

On June 29, 2020, Travis signed with Shimane Susanoo Magic of the B.League.

On October 17, 2023, Travis signed with the Indiana Pacers, but was waived the next day. On October 28, 2023, he joined the Indiana Mad Ants. However, on February 19, 2024, he was waived by the Mad Ants.

On March 19, 2024, Travis signed with Levanga Hokkaido of the B.League. On June 13, Travis signed with Sun Rockers Shibuya of the B.League.

On August 4, 2025, Travis signed with the Kaohsiung Aquas of the Taiwan Professional Basketball League (TPBL). On December 1, Kaohsiung Aquas terminated the contract relationship with Travis.

On September 25, 2026, Travis signed with the Akita Northern Happinets of the B.League.

== Career statistics ==
Legend
GP	Games played	GS	Games started	MPG	Minutes per game
FG%	Field goal percentage	3P%	3-point field goal percentage	FT%	Free throw percentage
RPG	Rebounds per game	APG	Assists per game	SPG	Steals per game
BPG	Blocks per game	PPG	Points per game	**Bold**	Career high

=== College ===
Year	Team	GP	GS	MPG	FG%	3P%	FT%	RPG	APG	SPG	BPG	PPG
2014–15	Stanford	28	12	23.1	.354	–	.183	4.6	.4	**.9**	.3	6.2
2015–16	Stanford	8	8	32.8	.411	–	.253	3.1	.8	.8	.6	7.4
2016–17	Stanford	27	27	30.1	**.433**	.000	.398	**5.1**	.5	.5	.2	8.7
2017–18	Stanford	**35**	**35**	**34.0**	.385	**.295**	.333	3.4	**1.3**	.7	.1	**9.4**
2018–19	Kentucky	32	28	28.6	.333	.269	**.423**	1.2	.9	.4	**.7**	8.7
Career		130	110	29.4	.365	.134	.259	3.6	.8	.6	.3	7.2

== Personal life ==
Travis was born in Minneapolis and has two brothers and two sisters. His brother, Jonah, played basketball at Harvard from 2011 to 2015, his brother, Jalen, played football at Princeton from 2020 to 2023, and his cousin, Ross, played basketball at Penn State and was a tight end in the NFL for six different teams.
