= Chris Ortiz =

Puerto Rican basketball player

Christopher Ortiz
No. 6 – Osos de Manatí
- Position: Power forward
- League: BSN

Personal information
- Born: April 2, 1993 (age 33) Brooklyn, New York, U.S.
- Listed height: 6 ft 8 in (2.03 m)
- Listed weight: 225 lb (102 kg)

Career information
- High school: Christ the King (Middle Village, New York)
- College: Kent State (2012–2016)
- NBA draft: 2016: undrafted
- Playing career: 2016–present

Career history
- 2016–2017: ETHA Engomis
- 2017: Cariduros de Fajardo
- 2017–2018: Kobrat
- 2018: Cariduros de Fajardo
- 2018: Caciques de Humacao
- 2018–2019: Helsinki Seagulls
- 2019: Brujos de Guayama
- 2019–2020: Bakken Bears
- 2020: Brujos de Guayama
- 2021: Defensor Sporting Club
- 2021: Brujos de Guayama
- 2021–2022: Maccabi Ashdod .B.C
- 2022: Brujos de Guayama
- 2022: Plateros de Fresnillo
- 2023: Osos de Manatí
- 2023–2024: Blackwater Bossing
- 2024–2025: Osos de Manatí
- 2025–2026: Kaohsiung Aquas
- 2026–present: Osos de Manatí

Christopher Ortiz (born April 2, 1993) is a Puerto Rican professional basketball player for the Osos de Manatí of the Baloncesto Superior Nacional (BSN), and the Puerto Rican national team. Standing at a height of 6 ft 8 in (2.03 m), he plays the power forward position.

== College career ==
Ortiz played college basketball at Kent State University.

== Professional career ==
He played with the Osos de Manatí of the Baloncesto Superior Nacional.

On October 21, 2025, Ortiz signed with the Kaohsiung Aquas of the Taiwan Professional Basketball League (TPBL).

On February 28, 2026, the Kaohsiung Aquas terminated the contract relationship with Ortiz.

== National team career ==
Ortiz has represented Puerto Rico since 2013 as part of the Puerto Rican national team. He has played in many tournaments including FIBA Basketball World Cup and FIBA Americup. He was also part of the team that helped Puerto Rico qualify to the 2024 Summer Olympics after defeating both Italy in the semifinals and Lithuania in the final of one of four 2024 FIBA Men's Olympic Qualifying Tournaments.
