= Caesar Keelung Black Kites =

- Leagues: Super Basketball League
- Founded: 2025; 1 year ago
- History: Keelung Black Kites; 2025–2026; Caesar Keelung Black Kites; 2026–present
- Location: Keelung, Taiwan
- General manager: Lin Kuan-Lun
- Head coach: Yang Chih-Hao
- Ownership: Keelung Basketball Committee
- Championships: 0
- Website: www.klblackkites.com.tw

Caesar Keelung Black Kites (Chinese: 凱撒基隆黑鳶) is a professional basketball team based in Keelung, Taiwan. They have been part of the Super Basketball League since 2025.

== History ==
On June 16, 2024, the Chinese Taipei Basketball Association agreed the Super Basketball League founded the Keelung City Basketball Team. On August 12, the Keelung City Basketball Team would not participate in 2025 Super Basketball League.

On August 18, 2025, the Keelung City Basketball Team joined the 2025 SBL draft. On October 22, the team was announced as the Keelung Black Kites.

On March 12, 2026, the Keelung Black Kites changed the name to the Caesar Keelung Black Kites.

== Current roster ==
Caesar Keelung Black Kites roster
Players
Coaches

Pos.	No.	Nat.	Name	Ht.	Wt.	Age	From
F	0	(Taiwan)	Liu Kuang-Shang	1.92 m (6 ft 4 in)	83 kg (183 lb)	26 – 30 September 1999	FJU
G	2	(Taiwan)	Chiang Kuang-Chien	1.84 m (6 ft 0 in)	88 kg (194 lb)	28 – 7 May 1998	NTUA
G	3	(Taiwan)	Wang Tzu-Kang (C)	1.83 m (6 ft 0 in)	74 kg (163 lb)	33 – 27 January 1993	NKNU
G	5	(Taiwan)	Yu Xiang-Ping	1.88 m (6 ft 2 in)	78 kg (172 lb)	23 – 29 September 2002	ISU
G	7	(Taiwan)	Huang Hung-Yu	1.85 m (6 ft 1 in)	85 kg (187 lb)	26 – 10 September 1999	NTNU
G	8	(Taiwan)	Wang Chen-Yuan	1.76 m (5 ft 9 in)	76 kg (168 lb)	27 – 2 September 1998	NCCU
G	10	(Taiwan)	Tsao Eeh-Fang	1.87 m (6 ft 2 in)	84 kg (185 lb)	23 – 1 April 2003	NCHU
C	12	(Senegal)	Moustapha Ndiaye (FS, DP)	2.06 m (6 ft 9 in)	105 kg (231 lb)	23 – 5 April 2003	NCCU
F	13	(Taiwan)	Lin Meng-Hsueh	1.95 m (6 ft 5 in)	90 kg (198 lb)	33 – 14 October 1992	NTSU
G	16	(Taiwan)	Hu Kai-Hsiang	1.90 m (6 ft 3 in)	92 kg (203 lb)	35 – 16 May 1991	CCU
F	18	(Taiwan)	Wu I-Ping	1.98 m (6 ft 6 in)	89 kg (196 lb)	33 – 29 August 1992	ISU
G	22	(Taiwan)	Lin Tzu-Huan	1.86 m (6 ft 1 in)	75 kg (165 lb)	23 – 26 February 2003	NTUST
F	24	(Taiwan)	Chu I-Tsung	1.86 m (6 ft 1 in)	84 kg (185 lb)	40 – 4 August 1986	HWU
C	35	(United States)	Wendell Lewis (FA)	2.04 m (6 ft 8 in)	119 kg (262 lb)	36 – 21 September 1989	Alabama State
G	68	(Taiwan)	Hsu Ting-Wei	1.80 m (5 ft 11 in)	71 kg (157 lb)	23 – 8 June 2003	NTSU

Head coach

- (Taiwan) Yang Chih-Hao

Assistant coach(es)

- (Taiwan) Seng Hsin-Han

Strength & conditioning coach(es)

- (Taiwan) Huang Sheng-Fu

Athletic trainer(s)

- (Taiwan) Hsieh Ping-You

Team manager

- (Taiwan) Lin Kuan-Lun

Legend

- (C) Team captain
- (FA) Free agent
- (FS) Foreign student player
- (DP) Unsigned draft pick
- Injured

- Roster
Updated: 2026-08-04

== Head coaches ==
#	Name	Term	GC	W	L	Win%	GC	W	L	Win%	Achievements
#	Name	Term	Regular season				Playoffs				Achievements
Keelung Black Kites / Caesar Keelung Black Kites
1	Yang Chih-Hao	2026–present	28	13	15	.464	8	4	4	.500	

== Season-by-season record ==
Super Basketball League
Season	Coach	Regular season				Postseason			
Season	Coach	Won	Lost	Win %	Finish	Won	Lost	Win %	Result
2026	Yang Chih-Hao	13	15	.464	3rd	4	4	.500	Won Semifinals vs Bank of Taiwan, 2–1; Lost Finals to Yulon, 2–3
Totals		13	15	.464	–	4	4	.500	1 Playoff Appearances
