= Jordy Tshimanga =

Canadian basketball player (born 1996)

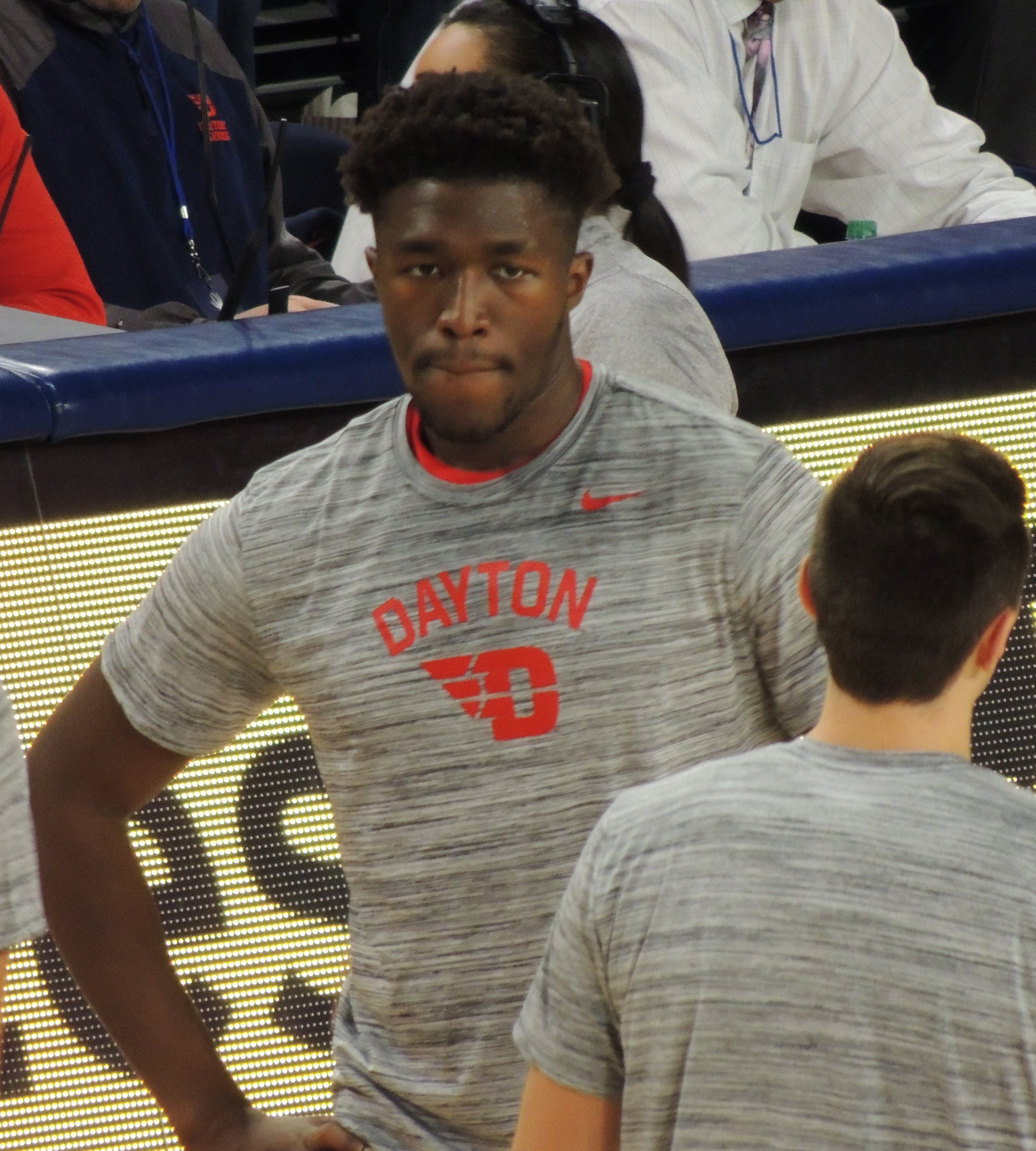
- Tshimanga before a January 2020 game.

No. 32 – Khasin Khuleguud
- Position: Center
- League: The League

Personal information
- Born: November 4, 1996 (age 30) Montreal, Quebec, Canada
- Listed height: 6 ft 11 in (2.11 m)
- Listed weight: 270 lb (122 kg)

Career information
- High school: MacDuffie School (Granby, Massachusetts)
- College: Nebraska (2016–2018); Dayton (2019–2021)
- NBA draft: 2021: undrafted
- Playing career: 2021–present

Career history
- 2021: Cleveland Charge
- 2021–2022: Iowa Wolves
- 2022: Saskatchewan Rattlers
- 2023: Iowa Wolves
- 2023: Cocodrilos de Caracas
- 2023: Calgary Surge
- 2023–2024: Trepça
- 2024: Calgary Surge
- 2024–2025: Kaohsiung Steelers
- 2025: Khasin Khuleguud
- 2025: Winnipeg Sea Bears
- 2025–2026: Taipei Taishin Mars
- 2026–present: Khasin Khuleguud

Career highlights
- Kosovo Cup winner (2024); Kosovo Supercup winner (2023); P. League+ Defensive Player of the Year (2025); P. League+ All-Defensive First Team (2025); P. League+ rebounds leader (2025); P. League+ blocks leader (2025); P. League+ steals leader (2025); The league winner (2026)

Jordy Tshimanga (born November 4, 1996) is a Canadian professional basketball player for the Khasin Khuleguud of The League. He played college basketball for the Dayton Flyers and the Nebraska Cornhuskers.

== Early life and high school career ==
Tshimanga was born in Montreal, the son of two Congolese parents. He has six brothers and sisters. Growing up, Tshimanga focused on football and began playing basketball in his teens. He attended MacDuffie School in Granby, Massachusetts and blossomed as a basketball player.

=== Recruiting ===
Tshimanga was a four-star selection by Scout.com and was rated as the No. 150 prospect in the senior class by Rivals.com. He was rated the No. 19 center in the country by Scout, No. 22 by 247Sports and No. 25 by ESPN.com. Tshimanga was ranked as the No. 15 prospect in New England by the New England Recruiting Report while ESPN.com rated him as the third-best prospect in the state of Massachusetts in 2016. He received offers from Arizona, Arizona State, Baylor, Boston College, Central Florida, LSU, Minnesota, Nebraska, Oklahoma State, Pittsburgh, Providence, SMU, UNLV, and Virginia Tech. Following official visits to Minnesota, Nebraska and UNLV, Tshimanga committed to Cornhuskers on May 15, 2016.

College recruiting
Name	Hometown	School	Height	Weight	Commit date
Jordy Tshimanga; C	Montreal, Quebec, Canada	MacDuffie School	6 ft 11 in (2.11 m)	270 lb (120 kg)	May 16, 2016
Jordy Tshimanga; C	Recruit ratings: Scout: Rivals: 247Sports: (79)				
Overall recruit ranking: Scout: xx, 19 (C) Rivals: 150, 17 (C) ESPN: xx, 25 (PF)
Note: In many cases, Scout, Rivals, 247Sports, On3, and ESPN may conflict in their listings of height and weight.; In these cases, the average was taken. ESPN grades are on a 100-point scale.; Sources: "2016 Nebraska Basketball Commitment List". Rivals.; "Men's Basketball Recruiting". Scout.; "ESPN - Nebraska Cornhuskers Basketball Recruiting 2016". ESPN.; "Scout.com Team Recruiting Rankings". Scout.; "2016 Team Ranking". Rivals.

== College career ==
=== Freshman year ===
Tshimanga appeared in all 31 games, averaging 5.0 points and 4.0 rebounds per game as a true freshman. He made significant strides throughout the season and played his best basketball during conference play, averaging 5.7 points and 4.2 rebounds per game, despite playing more than 20 minutes once in Big Ten play. Tshimanga led the Huskers in field goals percentage (.481) in conference play and was fourth on the team in rebounding. He scored a career-high 15 points and grabbed 9 rebounds in just 24 minutes in Nebraska's 72–61 loss against Michigan State on February 2, 2017.

=== Sophomore year ===
Tshimanga averaged 4.0 points and 4.6 rebounds per game his sophomore season. During the 2017–18 season, Tshimanga temporarily left the team due to undisclosed "personal issues", missing two games in January 2018 before returning. Following the season, in July 2018, Tshimanga announced his intention to transfer from Nebraska.

=== Junior year ===
Tshimanga ended up transferring to Dayton and sat out the 2018–19 season as a redshirt. He missed the preseason with a knee injury and did not practice with the team until shortly before the Maui Invitational. As a junior, Tshimanga averaged 3.0 points and 2.4 rebounds per game as a reserve.

=== Senior year ===
On February 9, 2021, Tshimanga posted 14 points and 12 rebounds in a 76–67 loss to VCU. As a senior, he became a starter and averaged 6.7 points and 7.7 rebounds per game. Tshimanga was named to the Atlantic 10 Academic Team.

== Professional career ==
=== Cleveland Charge / Iowa Wolves (2021–2022) ===
After going undrafted in the 2021 NBA draft, Tshimanga signed with the Cleveland Charge of the NBA G League on October 23, 2021. He played four games and averaged 3.5 points, 2.0 rebounds, and 12.5 minutes.

On November 15, 2021, Tshimanga was traded from the Charge to the Iowa Wolves, where he played 38 games and averaged 6.7 points and 6.5 rebounds in 17.3 minutes. During the season, he grabbed a career-high 17 rebounds on January 16 and a career-high 4 blocks on March 23, which the Wolves secure a top 5 rebounding total league-wide, with a team-high 186 total rebounds.

=== Saskatchewan Rattlers (2022) ===
On April 22, 2022, Tshimanga signed with the Saskatchewan Rattlers of the CEBL.

=== Return to Iowa (2023) ===
On January 13, 2023, Tshimanga was reacquired by the Iowa Wolves.

=== Cocodrilos de Caracas (2023) ===
On April 3, 2023, Tshimanga signed with Cocodrilos de Caracas of the Venezuelan League.

=== Calgary Surge (2023) ===
On July 5, 2023, Tshimanga signed with the Calgary Surge of the Canadian Elite Basketball League. The team reached the CEBL Finals, losing to the Scarborough Shooting Stars. In August 2023, Tshimanga was selected as a Western Conference All-Star for the 2023 CEBL Clash in Québec City. The West won in a 107–102 victory.

=== Trepça (2023–2024) ===
On August 18, 2023, Tshimanga signed with Trepça of the Kosovo Basketball Superleague and FIBA Europe Cup. Tshimanga won the Kosovo Cup in the final against Prishtina where he was one of the key players with 15 rebounds and 11 points. He parted ways with Trepça in March 2024 because of doping accusations. He was the best rebounder in the 2023-24 season averaging 10.0 rebounds per game.

=== Return to Calgary (2024) ===
On June 8, 2024, Tshimanga signed with the Calgary Surge for a second stint.

=== Kaohsiung Steelers (2024–2025) ===
On September 19, 2024, Tshimanga signed with the Kaohsiung 17LIVE Steelers of the P. League+.

=== Taipei Taishin Mars (2025) ===
On September 3, 2025, Tshimanga signed with the Taipei Taishin Mars of the Taiwan Professional Basketball League (TPBL). On January 16, 2026, the Taipei Taishin Mars terminated the contract relationship with Tshimanga.

== Career statistics ==
Legend
GP	Games played	GS	Games started	MPG	Minutes per game
FG%	Field goal percentage	3P%	3-point field goal percentage	FT%	Free throw percentage
RPG	Rebounds per game	APG	Assists per game	SPG	Steals per game
BPG	Blocks per game	PPG	Points per game	**Bold**	Career high

=== College ===
Year	Team	GP	GS	MPG	FG%	3P%	FT%	RPG	APG	SPG	BPG	PPG
2016–17	Nebraska	**31**	9	12.5	.449	–	**.625**	4.0	.3	**.5**	**.5**	**5.0**
2017–18	Nebraska	**31**	**18**	**13.6**	.455	–	.564	**4.6**	**.5**	.3	**.5**	4.0
2018–19	Dayton	Redshirt										
2019–20	Dayton	27	0	9.8	**.667**	–	.538	2.4	.4	.2	**.5**	3.0
Career		89	27	12.1	.490	–	.589	3.7	.4	.3	.5	4.0

== Personal life ==
Jordy is the son of Florent Tshimanga and was born on November 4, 1996. He has two older brothers, Link Kabadyundi and Yannick Wak, and two sisters, Yasmine Bidikuindila and Florence Tshimanga. Tshimanga's family originates from the Democratic Republic of the Congo and he speaks three languages (English, French and Lingala). Tshimanga majored in psychology at Nebraska.
