= Zach Lofton =

American basketball player (born 1992)

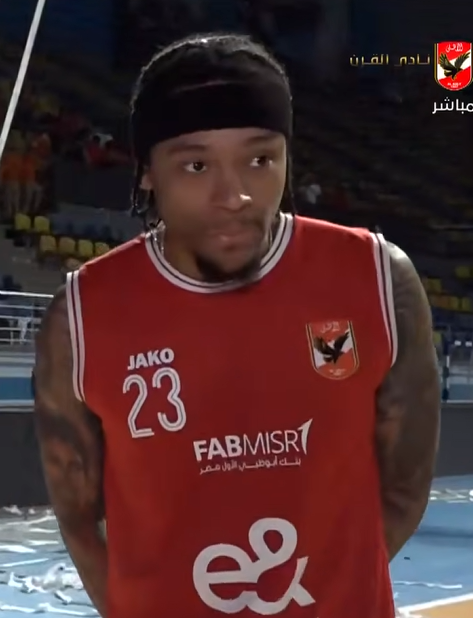
- Lofton with Al Ahly Cairo in 2026

No. 3 – Al Wahda
- Position: Shooting guard
- League: Syrian Basketball League

Personal information
- Born: November 18, 1992 (age 34) Saint Paul, Minnesota, U.S.
- Listed height: 6 ft 4 in (1.93 m)
- Listed weight: 180 lb (82 kg)

Career information
- High school: Columbia Heights (Columbia Heights, Minnesota)
- College: San Jacinto (2012–2013); Illinois State (2013–2014); Texas Southern (2016–2017); New Mexico State (2017–2018)
- NBA draft: 2018: undrafted
- Playing career: 2018–present

Career history
- 2018–2019: Detroit Pistons
- 2018–2019: →Grand Rapids Drive
- 2019: Grand Rapids Drive
- 2020: Rostock Seawolves
- 2021–2022: Kazma
- 2022–2023: Dynamo Lebanon
- 2023: Liaoning Arctic Wolves
- 2023: Dynamo Lebanon
- 2023: Al Ahly Benghazi
- 2023–2024: Meralco Bolts
- 2024: Homenetmen Beirut
- 2024: Al Riyadi
- 2024–2025: Sagesse SC
- 2025: Taipei Taishin Mars
- 2026: Homenetmen Beirut
- 2026: Al Ahly Cairo
- 2026: Al Ittihad Aleppo
- 2026: Al Riyadi
- 2026–present: Al Wahda

Career highlights
- BCL Asia champion (2024); AP Honorable Mention All-American (2017); SWAC Player of the Year (2017); First-team All-SWAC (2017); SWAC Newcomer of the Year (2017); First-team All-WAC (2018)
- Stats at NBA.com
- Stats at Basketball Reference

Zachary Matthew Lofton (born November 18, 1992) is an American professional basketball player for Al Wahda of the Syrian Basketball League. He played college basketball for New Mexico State University (NMSU). He transferred to NMSU from Texas Southern, where he was named the Southwestern Athletic Conference Player of the Year in 2017. He later played for other teams in different countries.

== College career ==
Lofton, a shooting guard from Saint Paul, Minnesota, started his college career at San Jacinto College, then played his sophomore season for Illinois State University. He averaged 11.3 points per game for the Redbirds before transferring to Minnesota in 2014. While sitting out his transfer year, Lofton was dismissed from the Golden Gophers team before playing a game. Lofton landed at Texas Southern, where in 2016–17 he averaged 16.8 points per game and led the Tigers to the 2017 NCAA tournament. At the close of the season, he was named SWAC Player of the Year and Newcomer of the Year.

Following his lone season with Texas Southern, Lofton declared for the 2017 NBA draft. Although he ultimately withdrew, he did announce that he would transfer from Texas Southern. He ultimately chose New Mexico State to play his final season of college eligibility.

As a senior at New Mexico State, Lofton averaged 20.1 points and 5.0 rebounds per game. He shot 46 percent from the field and 38 percent from behind the arc. Lofton was named to the All-Western Athletic Conference First Team and the 2018 All-WAC Newcomer team. Following the season he participated in the 2018 Portsmouth Invitational Tournament.

== Professional career ==
Lofton was not selected in the 2018 NBA draft. He signed with the Detroit Pistons for the NBA Summer League. He averaged 10.8 points and 2.5 rebounds per game and scored 21 points in the final Summer League game against the Los Angeles Lakers. Lofton subsequently signed with the Pistons and, in October, agreed to a two-way contract, splitting playing time with the Pistons and their NBA G League affiliate, the Grand Rapids Drive. On October 17, 2018, Lofton made his NBA debut with the Pistons. He recorded one steal in four minutes of play in a 103–100 win over the Brooklyn Nets. In his G League debut, Lofton had a double-double with 26 points, 11 rebounds, nine assists and four steals as the Drive lost to the Erie BayHawks 125–114.

On January 15, 2019, Lofton was waived by the Pistons, but retained by the Drive. He averaged 13.3 points, 3.1 rebounds, 2.3 assists, and 1.2 steals per game with the Drive. On February 1, 2020, Lofton signed with the Rostock Seawolves of the German ProA league. He averaged 27.7 points, 4.7 rebounds and 4.0 assists per game. On July 18, 2021, Lofton signed with Kazma of the Kuwaiti Division I Basketball League.

On September 22, 2022, Lofton signed with Dynamo Lebanon of the Lebanese Basketball League.

On August 18, 2023, Lofton re-signed with Dynamo Lebanon after playing for Liaoning Arctic Wolves of the National Basketball League.

On October 19, 2022, Lofton signed with Al Ahly Benghazi. In November 2023, Lofton made his debut for Al Ahly Benghazi in the Road to BAL. On November 1, 2023, Lofton scored a team-high 25 points in his debut for Al Ahly, in a 86–77 win over FAP. The following day, Lofton scored 32 points in a 73–84 win over Virunga, which sealed the group's first place for Al Ahly.

On November 8, 2023, Lofton signed with the Meralco Bolts of the Philippine Basketball Association (PBA), as one of the team's import for its participation in the 2023–24 East Asia Super League. He was eventually selected to play as the team's replacement import in place of the injured Suleiman Braimoh for the rest of the 2023–24 PBA Commissioner's Cup.

On January 11, 2024, Lofton signed with the Homenetmen Beirut of the Lebanese Basketball League.

On June 3, 2024, Lofton signed with the Al Riyadi of the Lebanese Basketball League.

On August 23, 2024, Lofton signed with the Sagesse Club of the Lebanese Basketball League.

On September 10, 2025, Lofton signed with the Taipei Taishin Mars of the Taiwan Professional Basketball League (TPBL). On December 24, the Taipei Taishin Mars terminated the contract relationship with Lofton.

== Career statistics ==
Legend
GP	Games played	GS	Games started	MPG	Minutes per game
FG%	Field goal percentage	3P%	3-point field goal percentage	FT%	Free throw percentage
RPG	Rebounds per game	APG	Assists per game	SPG	Steals per game
BPG	Blocks per game	PPG	Points per game	**Bold**	Career high

=== NBA ===
==== Regular season ====
Year	Team	GP	GS	MPG	FG%	3P%	FT%	RPG	APG	SPG	BPG	PPG
2018–19	Detroit	1	0	3.8	.000	.000	–	.0	.0	1.0	.0	.0

=== College ===
Year	Team	GP	GS	MPG	FG%	3P%	FT%	RPG	APG	SPG	BPG	PPG
2013–14	Illinois State	31	13	23.0	.339	.292	.764	3.0	1.5	1.0	.1	11.3
2016–17	Texas Southern	**35**	**31**	**32.6**	.420	.258	**.786**	3.9	**2.5**	**1.3**	**.3**	16.8
2017–18	New Mexico State	33	**31**	31.9	**.456**	**.380**	.772	**5.0**	1.7	1.1	.1	**20.1**
Career		99	75	29.4	.413	.322	.777	4.0	1.9	1.1	.2	16.2
