= Darral Willis =

American basketball player

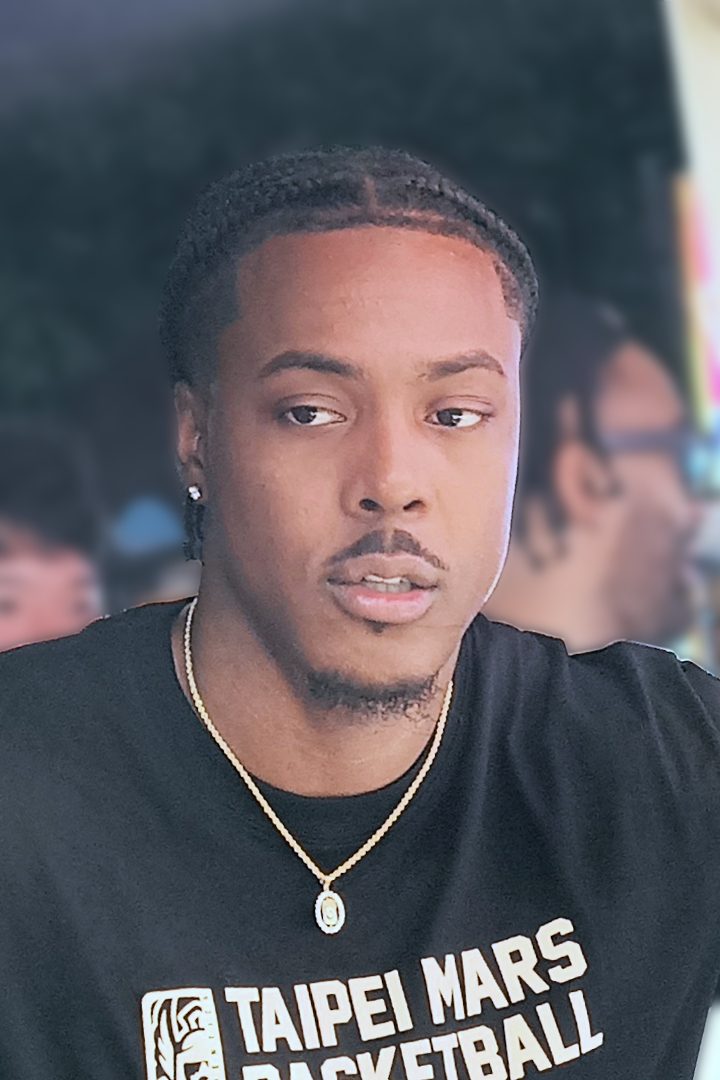

No. 21 – Toyama Grouses
- Position: Power forward / center
- League: B.League

Personal information
- Born: January 21, 1996 (age 30) Madison, Wisconsin, U.S.
- Listed height: 2.06 m (6 ft 9 in)
- Listed weight: 103 kg (227 lb)

Career information
- High school: Madison Memorial (Madison, Wisconsin)
- College: Pearl River CC (2014–2016); Wichita State (2016–2018)
- NBA draft: 2018: undrafted
- Playing career: 2018–present

Career history
- 2018–2019: Keravnos
- 2019–2020: Nizhny Novgorod
- 2020–2021: AS Monaco
- 2021: Brescia
- 2021–2022: BC Enisey
- 2022–2023: Lokomotiv Kuban
- 2023: Seoul Samsung Thunders
- 2023–2024: Levanga Hokkaido
- 2024–2025: Aris Thessaloniki
- 2025–2026: Taipei Taishin Mars
- 2026–present: Toyama Grouses

Career highlights
- Cypriot League champion (2019); Cypriot Cup winner (2019); Cypriot Cup MVP (2019); Cypriot League All-Star (2018); Third-team Parade All-American (2016)

Darral Willis Jr. (born January 21, 1996) is an American-born naturalized Cypriot professional basketball player for the Toyama Grouses of the B.League. Born and raised in Madison, Wisconsin, Willis played high school basketball at Madison Memorial High School. After two years at Pearl River and two years at Wichita State Willis entered the 2018 NBA draft but was not selected in the draft's two rounds.

== High school career ==
Willis played high school basketball at Madison Memorial, in Madison, Wisconsin.

== College career ==
Willis started his college career with Pearl River Community College. After dominating the JUCO ranks in his 2015–16 season following high school, Willis garnered offers from programs which included Wichita State, Arizona State, LSU, Oklahoma State, and Marquette, among others. He left the college in order to join Wichita State until 2018.

== Professional career ==
After going undrafted in the 2018 NBA draft, Willis joined Keravnos of the Cypriot League. He won the Cypriot Cup and he was named the MVP of the game after scoring 40 points and grabbing 17 rebounds in the final against AEK Larnaca. For the 2020–2021 season Willis joined AS Monaco.

On July 17, 2020, he signed with As Monaco of the LNB Pro A. In the middle of the season in France, Willis moved to Italy signing with Brescia.

On September 9, 2021, he has signed with BC Enisey of the VTB United League.

On August 19, 2022, he signed with Lokomotiv Kuban of the VTB United League.

On January 15, 2023, he signed with Seoul Samsung Thunders of the Korean Basketball League.

On August 3, 2023, Willis signed with Levanga Hokkaido of the B.League.

On July 8, 2024, Willis signed with Kyoto Hannaryz of the Japanese B.League. On September 2, 2024, his contract was terminated due to medical examination.

On November 23, 2024, Willis moved to Greek club Aris for the rest of the season.

On August 14, 2025, Willis signed with the Taipei Taishin Mars of the Taiwan Professional Basketball League (TPBL).

On August 10, 2026, Willis signed with the Toyama Grouses of the B.League.
