= 2025–26 TPBL season =

2nd TPBL season

- League: Taiwan Professional Basketball League
- Sport: Basketball
- Duration: October 11, 2025 – May 3, 2026 (regular season); May 5 – 6, 2026 (play-in); May 9 – 17, 2026 (semifinals); May 24 – June 6, 2026 (finals)
- Games: 36 per team
- Teams: 7
- TV partner(s): VL Sports, MOMOTV, Sportcast

Draft
- Top draft pick: Liu Cheng-Hsun
- Picked by: Hsinchu Toplus Lioneers

Regular season
- Top seed: Taoyuan Taiwan Beer Leopards
- Season MVP: Gao Jin-Wei (Leopards)
- Top scorer: Lasan Kromah (Leopards)

Playoffs

Finals
- Champions: Formosa Dreamers
- Runners-up: New Taipei Kings
- Finals MVP: Ben Bentil (Dreamers)

Taiwan Professional Basketball League seasons
- ← 2024–25 2026–27 →

The 2025–26 TPBL season was the second season of the Taiwan Professional Basketball League (TPBL), with the Formosa Dreamers, Hsinchu Toplus Lioneers, Kaohsiung Aquas, New Taipei CTBC DEA, New Taipei Kings, Taipei Taishin Mars, and the Taoyuan Taiwan Beer Leopards participating in this competition. The regular season started on October 11, 2025 and ended on May 3, 2026. The play-in series started on May 5 and ended on May 6. The semifinals series started on May 9 and ended on May 17. The finals series started on May 24 and ended on June 6. On June 6, the Formosa Dreamers defeated the New Taipei Kings, 4–3, winning the 2025–26 season championship.

== Teams ==
Team	Chinese name	Location	Arena	Map
Formosa Dreamers	福爾摩沙夢想家	Taichung City	Taichung Intercontinental Basketball Stadium	2025–26 TPBL season is located in Taiwan
Hsinchu Toplus Lioneers	新竹御嵿攻城獅	Hsinchu County	Hsinchu County Stadium	2025–26 TPBL season is located in Taiwan
Kaohsiung Aquas	高雄全家海神	Kaohsiung City	Kaohsiung Arena	2025–26 TPBL season is located in Taiwan
New Taipei CTBC DEA	新北中信特攻	New Taipei City	Xinzhuang Gymnasium; Taipei Heping Basketball Gymnasium (Note: Home game of the play-in.)	2025–26 TPBL season is located in Taiwan
New Taipei Kings	新北國王	New Taipei City	Xinzhuang Gymnasium; Taipei Heping Basketball Gymnasium (Note: Home games of the semifinals.)	2025–26 TPBL season is located in Taiwan
Taipei Taishin Mars	臺北台新戰神	Taipei City	Taipei Heping Basketball Gymnasium	2025–26 TPBL season is located in Taiwan
Taoyuan Taiwan Beer Leopards	桃園台啤永豐雲豹	Taoyuan City	Taoyuan Arena; Taoyuan City Zhongli Civil Sports Center (Note: Home games of the January 9 to April 5, 2026.)	2025–26 TPBL season is located in Taiwan

== Season format ==
- Each team plays against another six times, three at home and three on the road, respectively. Each team plays 36 matches total in the regular season.
- Play-in series: Best-of-three series. The series are contested by the teams that finished the regular season as the fourth seed and fifth seed. The fourth seed is awarded a one-win advantage. The winner can qualify to the semifinals series.
- Semifinals series: Best-of-five series. Matchup is decided by seeding in regular season. The first seed plays against the winner of play-in series, and the second seed plays against the third seed. The winners can qualify for the finals series.
- Finals series: Best-of-seven series. The series are contested by the winners of semifinals series.

== Import players restrictions ==
- Each team is able to register 4 import players.
  - The teams represented the league at the East Asia Super League can register 1 Asian import player. And these teams can only register 4 import players after registration deadline. The eligibility of the Asian import player is same as foreign student player.
- Each team is able to register 1 naturalised player as local player when naturalised player stayed in the same team for three years after finishing naturalisation.
- Each team is able to select 2 to 3 import players into active roster in each match.
- 8-Imports-In-4-Quarters Rule: each quarter can have 2 import players on the court.

== Import players ==
Team	Import players	Former players
Formosa Dreamers	(United States) (Taiwan) Brandon Gilbeck (United States) Aric Holman (United States) Trey Thompkins (Ghana) Ben Bentil	(United States) James Ennis (United States) Julian Boyd
Hsinchu Toplus Lioneers	(Latvia) Anžejs Pasečņiks (United States) TJ Holyfield (United States) Drew Pember (Croatia) Marin Marić	(United States) Craig Sword (Canada) Sim Bhullar
Kaohsiung Aquas	(Lithuania) Edgaras Želionis (Croatia) Kristijan Krajina (Serbia) Rade Zagorac (United States) Hunter Maldonado	(United States) Justin James (United States) Reid Travis (Haiti) Cady Lalanne (Puerto Rico) (United States) Chris Ortiz (Ukraine) (United States) Bogdan Bliznyuk (United States) Efe Odigie
New Taipei CTBC DEA	(Sweden) Viktor Gaddefors (Montenegro) Marko Todorović (Montenegro) Nemanja Radović (United States) Beau Beech	(Bulgaria) Pavlin Ivanov (United States) Nick King
New Taipei Kings	(United States) (Bulgaria) Jason Washburn (United States) Austin Daye (United States) (Jordan) Jalen Harris (Jamaica) (United States) Olufemi Olujobi	(Palestine) Sani Sakakini (AI) (United States) Chaundee Brown (United States) Jayden Gardner (United States) Jordan Tolbert
Taipei Taishin Mars	(United States) (Cyprus) Darral Willis (South Sudan) (Australia) Makur Maker (United States) Michael Frazier (Senegal) Youssou Ndoye	(United States) Zach Lofton (Canada) Jordy Tshimanga (United States) Diamond Stone (United States) Stanton Kidd
Taoyuan Taiwan Beer Leopards	(Liberia) (United States) Lasan Kromah (Mali) Cheick Diallo (United States) Chris McCullough (United States) Malcolm Miller	—N/a

(AI): Asian import players

== Transactions ==
=== Retirement ===
- On July 29, 2025, Douglas Creighton was named as the head coach of the Formosa Dreamers, ending his playing career.
- On August 2, 2025, Lin Li-Jen announced his retirement from professional basketball.
- On August 31, 2025, Jeremy Lin announced his retirement from professional basketball.
- On September 11, 2025, Chen Chun-Han joined the Chih Ping Senior High School basketball team as coach, ending his playing career.
- February 23, 2026, Julian Boyd announced his retirement from professional basketball.

=== Draft ===
The 2025 TPBL draft was held on August 11, 2025, at Grand Hilai Taipei in Taipei City.

=== Coaching changes ===
Coaching changes
Team	2024–25 season	2025–26 season
Off-season
Formosa Dreamers	Jamie Pearlman	Douglas Creighton
New Taipei CTBC DEA	Lee Yi-Hua	Momir Ratković
New Taipei Kings	Ryan Marchand	John Patrick
Taoyuan Taiwan Beer Leopards	Charles Dubé-Brais	Henrik Rödl
In-season
New Taipei Kings	John Patrick	Thomas Wisman (interim)
New Taipei Kings	Thomas Wisman (interim)	Hung Chih-Shan (interim)
Kaohsiung Aquas	Mathias Fischer	Zhu Yong-Hong (interim)
Taipei Taishin Mars	Hsu Hao-Cheng	Milan Stevanovic (interim)

==== Off-season ====
- On July 1, 2025, the Formosa Dreamers named Jamie Pearlman as their associate head coach.
- On July 3, 2025, the New Taipei CTBC DEA announced that Lee Yi-Hua left the team.
- On July 5, 2025, the New Taipei Kings announced that Ryan Marchand left the team for career decision.
- On July 9, 2025, the New Taipei Kings hired John Patrick as their new head coach.
- On July 22, 2025, the Taoyuan Taiwan Beer Leopards announced that Charles Dubé-Brais left the team. And the Taoyuan Taiwan Beer Leopards hired Henrik Rödl as their new head coach.
- On July 29, 2025, the Formosa Dreamers named Douglas Creighton, the captain of the Formosa Dreamers, as their new head coach.
- On August 25, 2025, the New Taipei CTBC DEA promoted Momir Ratković, the assistant coach of the New Taipei CTBC DEA, as their new head coach.

==== In-season ====
- On November 11, 2025, the New Taipei Kings announced to terminate contract relationship with John Patrick. And the New Taipei Kings named Hung Chih-Shan as their interim head coach after Thomas Wisman, the assistant coach of the New Taipei Kings, coached as interim head coach for one game.
- On December 31, 2025, the Kaohsiung Aquas announced to terminate contract relationship with Mathias Fischer, and named Zhu Yong-Hong, the Kaohsiung Aquas assistant coach, as their interim head coach.
- On March 26, 2026, the Taipei Taishin Mars announced that Hsu Hao-Cheng resigned from head coach, and named Milan Stevanovic, the Taipei Taishin Mars assistant coach, as their interim head coach.

== Preseason ==
The Taiwan Professional Basketball League held the preseason games at the Pingtung County Stadium on October 3 to 5, 2025.

=== Game log ===
October 3, 2025 Preseason #01	New Taipei CTBC DEA	109–111	Formosa Dreamers	Pingtung County
14:30 (UTC+8)	Scoring by quarter: 23–33, 30–28, 27–29, 29–21
	Pts: Bachir 26; Rebs: Radović 11; Asts: Gaddefors 6	boxscore	Pts: Gilbeck 25; Rebs: Gilbeck 13; Asts: Holman 6	Arena: Pingtung County Stadium; Referees: Yeh Chun-Hung, Lo Kuo-Hsien, Chen Chien-Lin

October 3, 2025 Preseason #02	Hsinchu Toplus Lioneers	98–88	Kaohsiung Aquas	Pingtung County
17:00 (UTC+8)	Scoring by quarter: 13–39, 25–16, 27–23, 33–10
	Pts: Reese 19; Rebs: Holyfield 9 Asts: Reese 4	boxscore	Pts: Yu Chun-An 14; Rebs: Lalanne 11; Asts: Hu Long-Mao 4	Arena: Pingtung County Stadium; Referees: Lai Chien-Hao, Yang Shih-Hsien, Huang Po-Wei

October 4, 2025 Preseason #03	Taipei Taishin Mars	105–100	New Taipei Kings	Pingtung County
12:00 (UTC+8)	Scoring by quarter: 28–33, 22–25, 27–26, 28–16
	Pts: Kidd 21; Rebs: Tshimanga 13; Asts: Ting Sheng-Ju 7	boxscore	Pts: Brown 19; Rebs: Sakakini 16; Asts: Lee Kai-Yan 6	Arena: Pingtung County Stadium; Referees: Yeh Chun-Hung, Hsieh Shang-Chien, Chen Ching-Hsiang

October 4, 2025 Preseason #04	Taoyuan Taiwan Beer Leopards	81–101	New Taipei CTBC DEA	Pingtung County
14:30 (UTC+8)	Scoring by quarter: 17–35, 20–32, 26–9, 18–25
	Pts: McCullough 23; Rebs: Miller 10; Asts: Tsao Xun-Xiang 5	boxscore	Pts: Bachir 30; Rebs: Radović 9 Asts: Gaddefors 6	Arena: Pingtung County Stadium; Referees: Chen Chao-Hung, Peng Shih-Hsuan, Huang Shao-Po

October 4, 2025 Preseason #05	Formosa Dreamers	94–88	Hsinchu Toplus Lioneers	Pingtung County
17:00 (UTC+8)	Scoring by quarter: 25–22, 24–24, 22–20, 23–22
	Pts: Chang Tsung-Hsien, Holman 21; Rebs: Gilbeck 15; Asts: Holman 4	boxscore	Pts: Kao Kuo-Hao 20; Rebs: Pember 8 Asts: Reese 5	Arena: Pingtung County Stadium; Referees: Lin Chien-Hung, Huang Chen-Feng, Ou Yang Yu-Hsien

October 5, 2025 Preseason #06	Kaohsiung Aquas	93–79	Taipei Taishin Mars	Pingtung County
12:00 (UTC+8)	Scoring by quarter: 34–24, 17–17, 19–21, 23–17
	Pts: Wu Siao-Jin 23; Rebs: Lu Wei-Ting 12; Asts: Hu Long-Mao, Chen Huai-An 5	boxscore	Pts: Chien 18; Rebs: Chien, Chen Kuan-Chuan 8 Asts: three players 2	Arena: Pingtung County Stadium; Referees: Chen Chao-Hung, Lo Kuo-Hsien, Hsu Wei-Kai

October 5, 2025 Preseason #07	New Taipei Kings	99–89	Taoyuan Taiwan Beer Leopards	Pingtung County
14:30 (UTC+8)	Scoring by quarter: 17–25, 20–19, 32–21, 30–24
	Pts: Brown 22; Rebs: Gardner 12; Asts: three players 5	boxscore	Pts: Lin Sin-Kuan 20; Rebs: Diallo 14; Asts: Gao Jin-Wei 7	Arena: Pingtung County Stadium; Referees: Chen Hung-Ming, Sung Ming-Lu, Wu Fang-Shan

== Regular season ==
The regular season started on October 11, 2025 and ended on May 3, 2026. On October 11, the 2025–26 season opening game, matched by the Kaohsiung Aquas and the New Taipei Kings, was played at Xinzhuang Gymnasium.

=== League table ===
Pos	Team	Pld	W	L	PCT	GB	Qualification
1	Taoyuan Taiwan Beer Leopards	36	23	13	.639	—	Advance to semifinals
2	Formosa Dreamers	36	22	14	.611	1	Advance to semifinals
3	Hsinchu Toplus Lioneers	36	22	14	.611	1	Advance to semifinals
4	New Taipei CTBC DEA	36	20	16	.556	3	Advance to play-in
5	New Taipei Kings	36	19	17	.528	4	Advance to play-in
6	Taipei Taishin Mars	36	11	25	.306	12	
7	Kaohsiung Aquas	36	9	27	.250	14	

Source: TPBL

=== Results ===
Home \ Away	MARS	DEA	KINGS	LEOPARDS	LIONEERS	DREAMERS	AQUAS
Taipei Taishin Mars	—	104–108	97–87	102–112	100–98	91–110	96–91*
Taipei Taishin Mars	—	79–95	96–98	114–108	98–101	91–104	90–104
Taipei Taishin Mars	—	103–111	102–116	73–99	86–104	96–118	104–112
New Taipei CTBC DEA	91–78	—	114–111	80–104	94–91	99–91	133–91
New Taipei CTBC DEA	104–112	—	94–82	85–75	79–84	115–122	118–91
New Taipei CTBC DEA	89–91	—	98–78	107–93	95–75	108–104	115–99
New Taipei Kings	120–123*	89–105	—	125–103	89–108	112–93	110–100
New Taipei Kings	116–95	85–78	—	100–116	90–97	94–91	111–94
New Taipei Kings	93–90	87–111	—	97–94	100–85	105–99	86–82
Taoyuan Taiwan Beer Leopards	122–102	85–78	103–101	—	96–94	105–92	90–112
Taoyuan Taiwan Beer Leopards	98–87	100–77	110–87	—	92–88	98–100	105–74
Taoyuan Taiwan Beer Leopards	107–96	96–93	101–114	—	111–114	104–100	99–85
Hsinchu Toplus Lioneers	83–94	102–85	87–94	98–82	—	90–85	97–89
Hsinchu Toplus Lioneers	94–102	103–99	113–90	102–91	—	95–91	113–97
Hsinchu Toplus Lioneers	96–73	117–100	98–78	79–76	—	85–94	102–99
Formosa Dreamers	128–117	92–87	116–96	83–104	82–81	—	101–106
Formosa Dreamers	108–98	104–118	97–114	91–98	113–98	—	96–93
Formosa Dreamers	99–66	100–91	107–90	111–84	92–86	—	96–90
Kaohsiung Aquas	105–110	114–111	91–79	78–100	82–101	86–99	—
Kaohsiung Aquas	108–103	84–113	94–111	102–108	99–89	73–99	—
Kaohsiung Aquas	93–104	90–88	111–112	75–101	79–95	97–107	—

Source: TPBL
Legend: Blue = home team win; Red = away team win.

== Playoffs ==
- Play-in series: The fourth and fifth seeds play the best-of-three play-in series. The fourth seed will be awarded a one-win advantage. The winner can qualify the semifinals series.
- Semifinals series: The winner of play-in series and the top three seeds play the best-of-five semifinals series. The winners can qualify the finals series.
- Finals series: The winners of the semifinals series play the best-of-seven finals series.

=== Bracket ===
Play-in
4	New Taipei CTBC DEA	1
5	**New Taipei Kings**	**2**

Semifinals
1	Taoyuan Taiwan Beer Leopards	1
5	**New Taipei Kings**	**3**
2	**Formosa Dreamers**	**3**
3	Hsinchu Toplus Lioneers	1

Finals
5	New Taipei Kings	3
2	**Formosa Dreamers**	**4**

Bold: Series winner
Italic: Team with home-court advantage

== Statistics ==
=== Individual statistic leaders ===
Category	Player	Team	Statistic
Points per game	Lasan Kromah	Taoyuan Taiwan Beer Leopards	24.2
Rebounds per game	Marko Todorović	New Taipei CTBC DEA	13.1
Assists per game	Ting Sheng-Ju	Taipei Taishin Mars	7.7
Steals per game	Lasan Kromah	Taoyuan Taiwan Beer Leopards	2.8
Blocks per game	Brandon Gilbeck	Formosa Dreamers	2.0
Turnovers per game	Lasan Kromah	Taoyuan Taiwan Beer Leopards	3.7
Fouls per game	Marko Todorović	New Taipei CTBC DEA	4.0
Minutes per game	Mohammad Al Bachir Gadiaga	New Taipei CTBC DEA	37:24
FG%	Cheick Diallo	Taoyuan Taiwan Beer Leopards	60.9%
3P%	Hu Long-Mao	Kaohsiung Aquas	46.0%
FT%	Lin Chun-Chi	Formosa Dreamers	84.9%

=== Individual game highs ===
Category	Player	Team	Statistic
Points	Makur Maker	Taipei Taishin Mars	48
Rebounds	Youssou Ndoye	Taipei Taishin Mars	23
Rebounds	Kristijan Krajina	Kaohsiung Aquas	23
Assists	Ting Sheng-Ju	Taipei Taishin Mars	16
Steals	Lasan Kromah	Taoyuan Taiwan Beer Leopards	9
Blocks	Brandon Gilbeck	Formosa Dreamers	6
Blocks	Jason Washburn	New Taipei Kings	6
Turnovers	Aric Holman	Formosa Dreamers	10
Three pointers	Huang Tsung-Han	Taipei Taishin Mars	8

=== Team statistic leaders ===
Category	Team	Statistic
Points per game	Formosa Dreamers	100.4
Rebounds per game	Formosa Dreamers	50.9
Assists per game	New Taipei CTBC DEA	24.0
Steals per game	New Taipei CTBC DEA	10.4
Blocks per game	Taoyuan Taiwan Beer Leopards	4.2
Turnovers per game	Formosa Dreamers	16.9
Fouls per game	Kaohsiung Aquas	22.4
FG%	Taoyuan Taiwan Beer Leopards	44.8%
3P%	Formosa Dreamers	34.2%
FT%	Formosa Dreamers	73.9%

== Awards ==
=== Yearly awards ===
2025–26 TPBL awards
Award		Recipient	Team	Ref.
Most Valuable Player		Gao Jin-Wei	Taoyuan Taiwan Beer Leopards	
Most Valuable Import		Lasan Kromah	Taoyuan Taiwan Beer Leopards	
Defensive Player of the Year		Brandon Gilbeck	Formosa Dreamers	
Rookie of the Year		Liu Cheng-Hsun	Hsinchu Toplus Lioneers	
Sixth Man of the Year		Lin Chun-Chi	Formosa Dreamers	
Most Improved Player		Tseng Po-Yu	Hsinchu Toplus Lioneers	
Most Popular Player of the Year		Gao Jin-Wei	Taoyuan Taiwan Beer Leopards	
Coach of the Year		Henrik Rödl	Taoyuan Taiwan Beer Leopards	
General Manager of the Year		Yen Hsing-Su	Taoyuan Taiwan Beer Leopards	
Home-Court of the Year		Hsinchu Toplus Lioneers		
Cheerleading Team of the Year		Passion Sisters	New Taipei CTBC DEA	
Most Popular Cheerleader of the Year		Yua Mikami	Formosa Sexy	
Most Popular Mascot of the Year		Ready	Hsinchu Toplus Lioneers	
Plays of the Year	Clutch Play of the Year	Kao Kuo-Hao	Hsinchu Toplus Lioneers	
Plays of the Year	Dunk of the Year	Samuel Manu	Taipei Taishin Mars	
Plays of the Year	Assist of the Year	Lu Kuan-Hsuan	Hsinchu Toplus Lioneers	
Plays of the Year	Block of the Year	Gao Jin-Wei	Taoyuan Taiwan Beer Leopards	

- All-TPBL First Team:
  - Gao Jin-Wei (Taoyuan Taiwan Beer Leopards)
  - Kao Kuo-Hao (Hsinchu Toplus Lioneers)
  - Mohammad Al Bachir Gadiaga (New Taipei CTBC DEA)
  - Lasan Kromah (Taoyuan Taiwan Beer Leopards)
  - Marko Todorović (New Taipei CTBC DEA)
- All-TPBL Second Team:
  - Ting Sheng-Ju (Taipei Taishin Mars)
  - Chiang Yu-An (Formosa Dreamers)
  - Su Wen-Ju (Kaohsiung Aquas)
  - Drew Pember (Hsinchu Toplus Lioneers)
  - Aric Holman (Formosa Dreamers)

- All-Defensive First Team:
  - Kao Kuo-Hao (Hsinchu Toplus Lioneers)
  - Lee Kai-Yan (New Taipei Kings)
  - Mohammad Al Bachir Gadiaga (New Taipei CTBC DEA)
  - Lasan Kromah (Taoyuan Taiwan Beer Leopards)
  - Brandon Gilbeck (Formosa Dreamers)
- All-Defensive Second Team:
  - Su Wen-Ju (Kaohsiung Aquas)
  - Hsieh Ya-Hsuan (New Taipei CTBC DEA)
  - Samuel Manu (Taipei Taishin Mars)
  - Malcolm Miller (Taoyuan Taiwan Beer Leopards)
  - Marko Todorović (New Taipei CTBC DEA)

=== Statistical awards ===
2025–26 TPBL statistical awards
Award	Recipient	Team	Statistic	Ref.
Points Leader	Lasan Kromah	Taoyuan Taiwan Beer Leopards	24.2	
Rebounds Leader	Marko Todorović	New Taipei CTBC DEA	13.1	
Assists Leader	Ting Sheng-Ju	Taipei Taishin Mars	7.7	
Steals Leader	Lasan Kromah	Taoyuan Taiwan Beer Leopards	2.8	
Blocks Leader	Brandon Gilbeck	Formosa Dreamers	2.0	

=== Finals awards ===
2026 TPBL Finals awards
Award	Recipient	Team	Ref.
Champion	Formosa Dreamers		
Finals MVP	Ben Bentil	Formosa Dreamers	

=== Player of the Week ===
Week	Recipient	Team	Ref.
1	Jayden Gardner	New Taipei Kings	
2	Lasan Kromah	Taoyuan Taiwan Beer Leopards	
3	Drew Pember	Hsinchu Toplus Lioneers	
4	Nemanja Radović	New Taipei CTBC DEA	
5	Lasan Kromah	Taoyuan Taiwan Beer Leopards	
6	Drew Pember	Hsinchu Toplus Lioneers	
7	Bogdan Bliznyuk	Kaohsiung Aquas	
8	Darral Willis	Taipei Taishin Mars	
9	Marko Todorović	New Taipei CTBC DEA	
10	Jason Washburn	New Taipei Kings	
11	Drew Pember	Hsinchu Toplus Lioneers	
12	Cheick Diallo	Taoyuan Taiwan Beer Leopards	
13	Bogdan Bliznyuk	Kaohsiung Aquas	
14	Kao Kuo-Hao	Hsinchu Toplus Lioneers	
15	Makur Maker	Taipei Taishin Mars	
16	Joseph Lin	New Taipei Kings	
17	Ben Bentil	Formosa Dreamers	
18	Gao Jin-Wei	Taoyuan Taiwan Beer Leopards	
19	Jalen Harris	New Taipei Kings	
20	Drew Pember	Hsinchu Toplus Lioneers	
21	Ben Bentil	Formosa Dreamers	
22	Drew Pember	Hsinchu Toplus Lioneers	
23	Lasan Kromah	Taoyuan Taiwan Beer Leopards	
24	Aric Holman	Formosa Dreamers	
25	Nemanja Radović	New Taipei CTBC DEA	
26	Cheick Diallo	Taoyuan Taiwan Beer Leopards	
27	Liu Cheng-Hsun	Hsinchu Toplus Lioneers	

=== Player of the Month ===
Month	Local player		Import player		Ref.
Month	Recipient	Team	Recipient	Team	Ref.
2025
October & November	Gao Jin-Wei	Taoyuan Taiwan Beer Leopards	Lasan Kromah	Taoyuan Taiwan Beer Leopards	
December	Hsieh Ya-Hsuan	New Taipei CTBC DEA	Marko Todorović	New Taipei CTBC DEA	
2026
January & February	Gao Jin-Wei	Taoyuan Taiwan Beer Leopards	Makur Maker	Taipei Taishin Mars	
March	Mohammad Al Bachir Gadiaga	New Taipei CTBC DEA	Ben Bentil	Formosa Dreamers	
April & May	Mohammad Al Bachir Gadiaga	New Taipei CTBC DEA	Aric Holman	Formosa Dreamers	

== Arenas ==
- The Taoyuan Taiwan Beer Leopards announced that their home games on January 9 to April 5, 2026 would change to Taoyuan City Zhongli Civil Sports Center.
- The New Taipei CTBC DEA announced that they would play their home game in play-in at the Taipei Heping Basketball Gymnasium.
- The New Taipei Kings announced that they would play their home game in semifinals at the Taipei Heping Basketball Gymnasium.

== Media ==
- The games will be broadcast on television via VL Sports, MOMOTV, Sportcast, and online via YouTube.
- The games will be broadcast on online via AXN Asia since February 8, 2026.

== Notable occurrences ==
- On July 11, 2025, the Taipei Taishin Mars traded Wang Lu-Hsiang to the TSG GhostHawks for cash considerations. And this trade became the first interleague trade between the teams of the P. League+ and TPBL.
- On July 16, 2025, the TPBL and P. League+ announced the cooperation for 7+3 teams playing in 2025–26 season.
- On July 24, 2025, the New Taipei Kings were invited to participate in 2025–26 East Asia Super League.
- On July 25, 2025, the TPBL cancelled the cooperation with P. League+, and the TPBL only discussed with P. League+ for league merging.
- On July 31, 2025, the TPBL stopped the discussion with P. League+ for league merging, and started to prepare for the 2025–26 season.
- On August 1, 2025, Jonah Morrison was reinstated by TPBL.
- On August 7, 2025, the TPBL modified the player eligibility rules, and the heritage player was cancelled.
- On August 27, 2025, the TPBL announced that Larry Chi resigned from secretary general for career decision, and named Wang Chih-Chun and Cheng Po-Jen, the deputy secretary and commissioner secretary of the league, as their interim secretary general and new deputy secretary.
- On September 16, 2025, the TPBL announced that the semifinals series changed to best-of-five series.
- On October 18, 2025, Brandon Gilbeck of the Formosa Dreamers became the first player to record 100 blocks in TPBL history.
- On October 19, 2025, Lasan Kromah of the Taoyuan Taiwan Beer Leopards became the first import player to record 200 assists in TPBL history.
- On October 26, 2025, Hu Long-Mao of the Kaohsiung Aquas recorded 1,000 rebounds in his career.
- On October 26, 2025, Gao Jin-Wei of the Taoyuan Taiwan Beer Leopards recorded 1,000 points in his career.
- On October 29, 2025, Hu Long-Mao of the Kaohsiung Aquas recorded 1,500 points in franchise career.
- On November 1, 2025, Ma Chien-Hao of the Formosa Dreamers recorded 500 points in TPBL career.
- On November 2, 2025, Malcolm Miller of the Taoyuan Taiwan Beer Leopards recorded 500 points in TPBL career.
- On November 9, 2025, Lasan Kromah of the Taoyuan Taiwan Beer Leopards became the first player to record 100 steals in TPBL history.
- On November 15, 2025, Samuel Manu of the Taipei Taishin Mars became the first local player to record 200 rebounds in TPBL history.
- On November 16, 2025, Gao Jin-Wei of the Taoyuan Taiwan Beer Leopards recorded 100 steals in his career.
- On November 16, 2025, Lasan Kromah of the Taoyuan Taiwan Beer Leopards recorded 1,500 points in Taiwan career.
- On December 2, 2025, the TPBL announced that Kao Kuo-Hao of the Hsinchu Toplus Lioneers was issued an indefinite suspension.
- On December 14, 2025, Su Wen-Ju of the Kaohsiung Aquas recorded 500 points in TPBL career.
- On December 19, 2025, Kao Kuo-Hao of the Hsinchu Toplus Lioneers was reinstated by TPBL.
- On December 20, 2025, Lasan Kromah of the Taoyuan Taiwan Beer Leopards became the first player to record 1,000 points in TPBL history.
- On December 21, 2025, Ting Sheng-Ju of the Taipei Taishin Mars recorded 200 assists in TPBL career.
- On January 4, 2026, Chiang Yu-An of the Formosa Dreamers recorded 100 assists in TPBL career.
- On January 9, 2026, Wang Hao-Chi of the Taoyuan Taiwan Beer Leopards recorded 1,500 points in his career.
- On January 11, 2026, Chris McCullough of the Taoyuan Taiwan Beer Leopards recorded 1,000 points in Taiwan career.
- On January 24, 2026, Mohammad Al Bachir Gadiaga of the New Taipei CTBC DEA recorded 2,500 points in his career.
- On January 31, 2026, Kao Kuo-Hao of the Hsinchu Toplus Lioneers recorded 2,000 points in his career.
- On January 31, 2026, Lasan Kromah of the Taoyuan Taiwan Beer Leopards recorded 1,200 points in TPBL career.
- On February 6, 2026, the TPBL requested CTBA referees for officiating.
- On February 7, 2026, Yu Huan-Ya of the Kaohsiung Aquas recorded 3,000 points in his career.
- On February 15, 2026, Lin Sin-Kuan of the Taoyuan Taiwan Beer Leopards recorded 100 steals in his career.
- On February 18, 2026, the New Taipei Kings were invited to participate in 2026 Basketball Champions League Asia – East (2026 BCL Asia – East).
- On February 15, 2026, Hsieh Ya-Hsuan of the New Taipei CTBC DEA became the first local player to record 100 steals in TPBL history.
- On March 3, 2026, the TPBL announced a partnership with the INMORIES.
- On March 8, 2026, Jason Washburn of the New Taipei Kings became the first player to record 500 rebounds in TPBL history.
- On March 15, 2026, Lasan Kromah of the Taoyuan Taiwan Beer Leopards recorded 500 assists in Taiwan career.
- On March 21, 2026, Gao Jin-Wei of the Taoyuan Taiwan Beer Leopards recorded 500 assists in his career.
- On March 21, 2026, Gao Jin-Wei of the Taoyuan Taiwan Beer Leopards became the first local player to record 1,000 points in TPBL history.
- On April 4, 2026, Lasan Kromah of the Taoyuan Taiwan Beer Leopards recorded 2,000 points in Taiwan career.
- On April 11, 2026, Jason Washburn of the New Taipei Kings recorded 1,000 points in TPBL career.
- On April 12, 2026, Chiang Yu-An of the Formosa Dreamers recorded 500 points in TPBL career.
- On April 26, 2026, Gao Jin-Wei of the Taoyuan Taiwan Beer Leopards recorded 1,500 points in his career.
- On May 2, 2026, Huang Tsung-Han of the Taipei Taishin Mars recorded 100 three pointers in TPBL career.
- On May 2, 2026, Malcolm Miller of the Taoyuan Taiwan Beer Leopards recorded 1,000 points in Taiwan career.
- On May 2, 2026, Lin Sin-Kuan of the Taoyuan Taiwan Beer Leopards recorded 1,000 points in his career.
- On May 4, 2026, Lasan Kromah of the Taoyuan Taiwan Beer Leopards became the first player to award the two straight Points Leader awards and Steals Leader awards in TPBL history. And Brandon Gilbeck of the Formosa Dreamers became the first player to award the two straight Blocks Leader awards in TPBL history.
- On May 6, 2026, New Taipei Kings became the first team to qualify semifinals series with lower seed in TPBL history.
- On May 8, 2026, Gao Jin-Wei of the Taoyuan Taiwan Beer Leopards became the first player to award the two straight Block of the Year awards in TPBL history.
- On May 9, 2026, Brandon Gilbeck of the Formosa Dreamers became the first player to award the two straight Defensive Player of the Year awards in TPBL history.
- On May 9, 2026, Brandon Gilbeck of the Formosa Dreamers became the first player to award the two straight All-Defensive First Team awards in TPBL history. And Hsieh Ya-Hsuan of the New Taipei CTBC DEA, Samuel Manu of the Taipei Taishin Mars and Malcolm Miller of the Taoyuan Taiwan Beer Leopards became the players to award the two straight All-Defensive Second Team awards in TPBL history.
- On May 10, 2026, Lasan Kromah of the Taoyuan Taiwan Beer Leopards became the first player to record triple-double (with 29 points, 11 rebounds, and 12 assists) during the semifinals series in TPBL history.
- On May 11, 2026, Gao Jin-Wei of the Taoyuan Taiwan Beer Leopards and Lasan Kromah of the Taoyuan Taiwan Beer Leopards became the players to award the two straight All-TPBL First Team awards in TPBL history. And Su Wen-Ju of the Kaohsiung Aquas became the first player to award the two straight All-TPBL Second Team awards in TPBL history.
- On May 14, 2026, Hsinchu Toplus Lioneers became the first team to award the two straight Home-Court of the Year awards in TPBL history.
- On May 19, 2026, Gao Jin-Wei of the Taoyuan Taiwan Beer Leopards became the first player to award the two straight Most Popular Player of the Year awards in TPBL history.

== TPBL team in Asian competition ==
Team	Competition	Progress	Result
New Taipei Kings	**East Asia Super League**	Group stage Group C	2nd place out of 4 teams (3–3)
New Taipei Kings	**East Asia Super League**	Finals Quarterfinals	Loss to (Japan) Utsunomiya Brex
New Taipei Kings	**Basketball Champions League Asia**	BCL Asia – East Group stage Group B	4th place out of 4 teams (2–4)

== See also ==
EASL

- 2025–26 East Asia Super League

BCL Asia

- 2026 Basketball Champions League Asia – East

TPBL

- 2025–26 Formosa Dreamers season
- 2025–26 Hsinchu Toplus Lioneers season
- 2025–26 Kaohsiung Aquas season
- 2025–26 New Taipei CTBC DEA season
- 2025–26 New Taipei Kings season
- 2025–26 Taipei Taishin Mars season
- 2025–26 Taoyuan Taiwan Beer Leopards season
