= 2025–26 TPBL regular season =

2nd TPBL regular season

Taiwan Professional Basketball League
- Season: 2025–26
- Duration: October 11, 2025 – May 3, 2026
- Games played: 36 per team
- Teams: 7

Regular season
- Season MVP: Gao Jin-Wei (Leopards)

Statistical leaders
Points	Lasan Kromah (Leopards)	24.2
Rebounds	Marko Todorović (DEA)	13.1
Assists	Ting Sheng-Ju (Mars)	7.7

Records
- Biggest home win: Aquas 91–133 DEA (January 24, 2026)
- Biggest away win: DEA 113–84 Aquas (February 8, 2026)
- Highest scoring: Aquas 91–133 DEA (January 24, 2026)
- Lowest scoring: Mars 66–99 Dreamers (April 18, 2026)
- Winning streak: 9 games Dreamers
- Losing streak: 6 games Aquas (2 times); Mars
- All statistics correct as of May 3, 2026.

The 2025–26 TPBL regular season is the second regular season of Taiwan Professional Basketball League. Participating teams included the Formosa Dreamers, Hsinchu Toplus Lioneers, Kaohsiung Aquas, New Taipei CTBC DEA, New Taipei Kings, Taipei Taishin Mars, and the Taoyuan Taiwan Beer Leopards. Each team played against another six times, three at home and three on the road, respectively, led to 36 matches in total. The regular season started on October 11, 2025 and ended on May 3, 2026. The 2025–26 season opening game, matched by the Kaohsiung Aquas and the New Taipei Kings, was played at Xinzhuang Gymnasium.

== League table ==
Pos	Team	Pld	W	L	PCT	GB	Qualification
1	Taoyuan Taiwan Beer Leopards	36	23	13	.639	—	Advance to semifinals
2	Formosa Dreamers	36	22	14	.611	1	Advance to semifinals
3	Hsinchu Toplus Lioneers	36	22	14	.611	1	Advance to semifinals
4	New Taipei CTBC DEA	36	20	16	.556	3	Advance to play-in
5	New Taipei Kings	36	19	17	.528	4	Advance to play-in
6	Taipei Taishin Mars	36	11	25	.306	12	
7	Kaohsiung Aquas	36	9	27	.250	14	

Source: TPBL

=== Head to head ===
Home \ Away	MARS	DEA	KINGS	LEOPARDS	LIONEERS	DREAMERS	AQUAS
Taipei Taishin Mars	—	0–3	1–2	1–2	1–2	0–3	1–2
New Taipei CTBC DEA	1–2	—	3–0	2–1	2–1	2–1	3–0
New Taipei Kings	2–1	1–2	—	2–1	1–2	3–0	3–0
Taoyuan Taiwan Beer Leopards	3–0	3–0	2–1	—	2–1	2–1	2–1
Hsinchu Toplus Lioneers	1–2	3–0	2–1	3–0	—	2–1	3–0
Formosa Dreamers	3–0	2–1	2–1	1–2	3–0	—	2–1
Kaohsiung Aquas	1–2	2–1	1–2	0–3	1–2	0–3	—

Source: TPBL
Legend: Blue = home team win; Red = away team win.
Matches with lighter background shading were decided after overtime.

== Matches ==
=== Matchweek 1 (opening match) ===
October 11, 2025 Regular #001	Kaohsiung Aquas	100–110	New Taipei Kings	New Taipei City
17:00 (UTC+8)	Scoring by quarter: 27–27, 24–26, 16–25, 33–32
	Pts: James 28; Rebs: James, Lalanne 14; Asts: James 8	boxscore	Pts: Gardner 22; Rebs: Gardner 15; Asts: Lee Kai-Yan 5	Arena: Xinzhuang Gymnasium; Attendance: 4,568; Referees: Chen Hung-Ming, Yeh Chun-Hung, Lo Kuo-Hsien

October 12, 2025 Regular #002	Formosa Dreamers	93–112	New Taipei Kings	New Taipei City
17:00 (UTC+8)	Scoring by quarter: 21–37, 29–25, 24–33, 19–17
	Pts: Holman 32; Rebs: Holman 16; Asts: three players 3	boxscore	Pts: Gardner 25; Rebs: Gardner 8 Asts: J. Lin 9	Arena: Xinzhuang Gymnasium; Attendance: 4,047; Referees: Lin Chien-Hung, Lai Chien-Hao, Huang Chen-Feng

=== Matchweek 2 ===
October 18, 2025 Regular #003	Kaohsiung Aquas	106–101	Formosa Dreamers	Taichung City
14:30 (UTC+8)	Scoring by quarter: 27–24, 27–23, 29–24, 23–30
	Pts: Travis 24; Rebs: Travis 13; Asts: Yu Huan-Ya 7	boxscore	Pts: Ennis 26; Rebs: Gilbeck 8 Asts: Holman 5	Arena: Taichung Intercontinental Basketball Stadium; Attendance: 2,616; Referees: Yeh Chun-Hung, Lo Kuo-Hsien, Wu Fang-Shan

October 18, 2025 Regular #004	New Taipei CTBC DEA	105–89	New Taipei Kings	New Taipei City
17:00 (UTC+8)	Scoring by quarter: 34–22, 19–23, 32–22, 20–22
	Pts: Gaddefors 29; Rebs: Radović 16; Asts: Gaddefors 6	boxscore	Pts: Washburn 18; Rebs: Washburn 12; Asts: Lin Yan-Ting 5	Arena: Xinzhuang Gymnasium; Attendance: 4,385; Referees: Chen Chao-Hung, Lai Chien-Hao, Ou Yang Yu-Hsien

October 19, 2025 Regular #005	Taoyuan Taiwan Beer Leopards	104–83	Formosa Dreamers	Taichung City
14:30 (UTC+8)	Scoring by quarter: 34–28, 22–22, 27–16, 21–17
	Pts: Kromah 30; Rebs: McCullough 13; Asts: Kromah 13	boxscore	Pts: Lin Chun-Chi 16; Rebs: Gilbeck 11; Asts: Chiang Yu-An, Ennis 4	Arena: Taichung Intercontinental Basketball Stadium; Attendance: 2,637; Referees: Sung Ming-Lu, Lin Chien-Hung, Hsu Wei-Kai

October 19, 2025 Regular #006	Taipei Taishin Mars	123–120(OT)	New Taipei Kings	New Taipei City
17:00 (UTC+8)	Scoring by quarter: 26–28, 28–30, 31–16, 23–34, Overtime: 15–12
	Pts: Lofton 41; Rebs: Tshimanga 10; Asts: Lofton 14	boxscore	Pts: Gardner 23; Rebs: Sakakini 14; Asts: J. Lin 11	Arena: Xinzhuang Gymnasium; Attendance: 3,650; Referees: Huang Chen-Feng, Lo Kuo-Hsien, Chen Ching-Hsiang

=== Matchweek 3 ===
October 25, 2025 Regular #007	New Taipei Kings	79–91	Kaohsiung Aquas	Kaohsiung City
14:30 (UTC+8)	Scoring by quarter: 18–30, 22–22, 21–12, 18–27
	Pts: Daye 20; Rebs: Daye 9 Asts: Lee Kai-Yan, Lin Yan-Ting 4	boxscore	Pts: James 24; Rebs: Lalanne 12; Asts: Yu Huan-Ya 3	Arena: Kaohsiung Arena; Attendance: 7,138; Referees: Lai Chien-Hao, Peng Shih-Hsuan, Yang Shih-Hsien

October 25, 2025 Regular #008	Taipei Taishin Mars	78–91	New Taipei CTBC DEA	New Taipei City
17:00 (UTC+8)	Scoring by quarter: 28–35, 20–23, 15–21, 15–12
	Pts: Lofton 25; Rebs: Tshimanga 16; Asts: Lofton 4	boxscore	Pts: Radović 16; Rebs: Gaddefors 11; Asts: Gaddefors 10	Arena: Xinzhuang Gymnasium; Attendance: 5,851; Referees: Yeh Chun-Hung, Chen Chien-Lin, Ou Yang Yu-Hsien

October 26, 2025 Regular #009	Hsinchu Toplus Lioneers	101–82	Kaohsiung Aquas	Kaohsiung City
14:30 (UTC+8)	Scoring by quarter: 24–28, 27–22, 31–20, 19–12
	Pts: Pember 29; Rebs: Pember 19; Asts: Tseng Po-Yu 5	boxscore	Pts: Lalanne 23; Rebs: Lalanne 11; Asts: James 4	Arena: Kaohsiung Arena; Attendance: 4,531; Referees: Chen Chao-Hung, Sung Ming-Lu, Huang Shao-Po

October 26, 2025 Regular #010	Taoyuan Taiwan Beer Leopards	104–80	New Taipei CTBC DEA	New Taipei City
17:00 (UTC+8)	Scoring by quarter: 38–23, 28–28, 18–9, 20–20
	Pts: Kromah 25; Rebs: Miller 10; Asts: Miller, Kromah 4	boxscore	Pts: Radović 19; Rebs: Ivanov 11; Asts: Hsieh Ya-Hsuan 6	Arena: Xinzhuang Gymnasium; Attendance: 5,050; Referees: Chen Hung-Ming, Hsieh Shang-Chien, Wu Fang-Shan

=== Matchweek 4 ===
October 29, 2025 Regular #011	Formosa Dreamers	99–86	Kaohsiung Aquas	Kaohsiung City
19:00 (UTC+8)	Scoring by quarter: 21–19, 32–22, 26–25, 20–20
	Pts: Chang Tsung-Hsien, Ennis 21; Rebs: Holman 10; Asts: Chiang Yu-An 6	boxscore	Pts: Hu Long-Mao 28; Rebs: Ortiz, Travis 7 Asts: Chen Huai-An 8	Arena: Kaohsiung Arena; Attendance: 2,861; Referees: Sung Ming-Lu, Hsieh Shang-Chien, Ou Yang Yu-Hsien

November 1, 2025 Regular #012	Taipei Taishin Mars	110–105	Kaohsiung Aquas	Kaohsiung City
14:30 (UTC+8)	Scoring by quarter: 24–25, 25–27, 33–29, 28–24
	Pts: Lofton, Kidd 22; Rebs: Tshimanga 16; Asts: Lofton 7	boxscore	Pts: James 27; Rebs: Lalanne 11; Asts: James 5	Arena: Kaohsiung Arena; Attendance: 3,657; Referees: Chen Hung-Ming, Peng Shih-Hsuan, Yang Shih-Hsien

November 1, 2025 Regular #013	Formosa Dreamers	91–99	New Taipei CTBC DEA	New Taipei City
17:00 (UTC+8)	Scoring by quarter: 21–32, 25–30, 28–20, 17–17
	Pts: Ennis 22; Rebs: Ennis 14; Asts: Ennis 5	boxscore	Pts: Radović 29; Rebs: Gaddefors 12; Asts: Bachir 5	Arena: Xinzhuang Gymnasium; Attendance: 4,034; Referees: Chen Chao-Hung, Lin Chien-Hung, Wu Fang-Shan

November 2, 2025 Regular #014	Taoyuan Taiwan Beer Leopards	100–78	Kaohsiung Aquas	Kaohsiung City
14:30 (UTC+8)	Scoring by quarter: 29–10, 21–19, 32–26, 18–23
	Pts: Miller 28; Rebs: Miller 11; Asts: Gao Jin-Wei 8	boxscore	Pts: Lalanne 27; Rebs: Lalanne 13; Asts: Chen Huai-An 4	Arena: Kaohsiung Arena; Attendance: 3,544; Referees: Huang Chen-Feng, Lai Chien-Hao, Chen Chien-Lin

November 2, 2025 Regular #015	Hsinchu Toplus Lioneers	91–94	New Taipei CTBC DEA	New Taipei City
17:00 (UTC+8)	Scoring by quarter: 29–21, 22–22, 26–28, 14–23
	Pts: Pember 16; Rebs: Pember 12; Asts: Pasečņiks 4	boxscore	Pts: Gaddefors 23; Rebs: Todorović, Gaddefors 11; Asts: Lin Wei-Han 8	Arena: Xinzhuang Gymnasium; Attendance: 4,108; Referees: Lo Kuo-Hsien, Yeh Chun-Hung, Huang Shao-Po

=== Matchweek 5 ===
November 5, 2025 Regular #016	Hsinchu Toplus Lioneers	81–82	Formosa Dreamers	Taichung City
19:00 (UTC+8)	Scoring by quarter: 23–22, 17–18, 21–21, 20–21
	Pts: Pember 24; Rebs: Pember 18; Asts: Tseng Po-Yu 7	boxscore	Pts: Holman 18; Rebs: Thompkins 12; Asts: Ennis 4	Arena: Taichung Intercontinental Basketball Stadium; Attendance: 2,109; Referees: Lai Chien-Hao, Peng Shih-Hsuan, Huang Po-Wei

November 7, 2025 Regular #017	New Taipei CTBC DEA	87–92	Formosa Dreamers	Taichung City
19:00 (UTC+8)	Scoring by quarter: 20–32, 22–22, 19–19, 26–19
	Pts: Radović 22; Rebs: Gaddefors 13; Asts: Gaddefors 6	boxscore	Pts: Ma Chien-Hao 17; Rebs: Gilbeck 14; Asts: Chiang Yu-An 5	Arena: Taichung Intercontinental Basketball Stadium; Attendance: 2,280; Referees: Huang Chen-Feng, Yeh Chun-Hung, Huang Shao-Po

November 8, 2025 Regular #018	Hsinchu Toplus Lioneers	108–89	New Taipei Kings	New Taipei City
14:30 (UTC+8)	Scoring by quarter: 25–23, 26–28, 22–18, 35–20
	Pts: Sword 32; Rebs: Holyfield 7 Asts: Kao Kuo-Hao 10	boxscore	Pts: Gardner 27; Rebs: Gardner 15; Asts: Lee Kai-Yan 5	Arena: Xinzhuang Gymnasium; Attendance: 3,678; Referees: Lin Chien-Hung, Huang Chen-Feng, Wu Fang-Shan

November 8, 2025 Regular #019	Taipei Taishin Mars	102–122	Taoyuan Taiwan Beer Leopards	Taoyuan City
17:00 (UTC+8)	Scoring by quarter: 33–29, 26–40, 22–24, 21–29
	Pts: Lofton 31; Rebs: Willis 13; Asts: Lofton 5	boxscore	Pts: Kromah 29; Rebs: Miller 14; Asts: Gao Jin-Wei, Kromah 6	Arena: Taoyuan Arena; Attendance: 6,023; Referees: Yeh Chun-Hung, Lo Kuo-Hsien, Hsu Wei-Kai

November 9, 2025 Regular #020	Kaohsiung Aquas	94–111	New Taipei Kings	New Taipei City
14:30 (UTC+8)	Scoring by quarter: 24–33, 24–20, 26–26, 20–32
	Pts: Hu Long-Mao 20; Rebs: Lalanne 14; Asts: Su Wen-Ju 7	boxscore	Pts: Sakakini 36; Rebs: Gardner, Brown 12; Asts: Lee Kai-Yan 10	Arena: Xinzhuang Gymnasium; Attendance: 4,085; Referees: Hsieh Wen-Wei, Lai Chien-Hao, Chen Chien-Lin

November 9, 2025 Regular #021	New Taipei CTBC DEA	78–85	Taoyuan Taiwan Beer Leopards	Taoyuan City
17:00 (UTC+8)	Scoring by quarter: 22–21, 21–17, 21–22, 14–25
	Pts: Radović 23; Rebs: Radović 18; Asts: Gaddefors 5	boxscore	Pts: McCullough 29; Rebs: McCullough 12; Asts: Kromah 7	Arena: Taoyuan Arena; Attendance: 4,748; Referees: Chen Hung-Ming, Yang Shih-Hsien, Chen Ching-Hsiang

=== Matchweek 6 ===
November 12, 2025 Regular #022	Formosa Dreamers	91–94	New Taipei Kings	New Taipei City
19:00 (UTC+8)	Scoring by quarter: 29–20, 18–20, 19–25, 25–29
	Pts: Chiang Yu-An, Gilbeck 17; Rebs: Ennis 14; Asts: five players 3	boxscore	Pts: Sakakini 26; Rebs: Gardner 12; Asts: J. Lin 8	Arena: Xinzhuang Gymnasium; Attendance: 3,334; Referees: Chen Hung-Ming, Lo Kuo-Hsien, Chen Chien-Lin

November 15, 2025 Regular #023	New Taipei CTBC DEA	85–102	Hsinchu Toplus Lioneers	Hsinchu County
14:30 (UTC+8)	Scoring by quarter: 18–28, 19–24, 25–22, 23–28
	Pts: Hsieh Ya-Hsuan, Radović 24; Rebs: Todorović 16; Asts: Lin Wei-Han 5	boxscore	Pts: Pember 27; Rebs: Pember 14; Asts: Tseng Po-Yu 8	Arena: Hsinchu County Stadium; Attendance: 5,532; Referees: Chen Hung-Ming, Yeh Chun-Hung, Wu Fang-Shan

November 15, 2025 Regular #024	New Taipei Kings	87–97	Taipei Taishin Mars	Taipei City
17:00 (UTC+8)	Scoring by quarter: 19–30, 18–24, 21–18, 29–25
	Pts: Daye 17; Rebs: Washburn 11; Asts: Lin Yan-Ting 11	boxscore	Pts: Lofton 28; Rebs: Tshimanga 15; Asts: Chien 4	Arena: Taipei Heping Basketball Gymnasium; Attendance: 5,500; Referees: Lin Chien-Hung, Peng Shih-Hsuan, Hsieh Shang-Chien

November 16, 2025 Regular #025	Kaohsiung Aquas	89–97	Hsinchu Toplus Lioneers	Hsinchu County
14:30 (UTC+8)	Scoring by quarter: 28–30, 27–23, 20–18, 14–26
	Pts: Ortiz 24; Rebs: Bliznyuk 9 Asts: Su Wen-Ju 6	boxscore	Pts: Pember 18; Rebs: Pember 16; Asts: Tseng Po-Yu 8	Arena: Hsinchu County Stadium; Attendance: 4,821; Referees: Chen Chao-Hung, Yang Shih-Hsien, Hsu Wei-Kai

November 16, 2025 Regular #026	Taoyuan Taiwan Beer Leopards	112–102	Taipei Taishin Mars	Taipei City
17:00 (UTC+8)	Scoring by quarter: 33–17, 24–31, 26–20, 29–34
	Pts: Kromah 29; Rebs: Diallo 22; Asts: Kromah 9	boxscore	Pts: Kidd 23; Rebs: Tshimanga 17; Asts: Lofton 6	Arena: Taipei Heping Basketball Gymnasium; Attendance: 4,336; Referees: Hsieh Wen-Wei, Huang Chen-Feng, Ou Yang Yu-Hsien

=== Matchweek 7 ===
November 19, 2025 Regular #027	Kaohsiung Aquas	112–90	Taoyuan Taiwan Beer Leopards	Taoyuan City
19:00 (UTC+8)	Scoring by quarter: 35–18, 26–32, 26–21, 25–19
	Pts: Su Wen-Ju 31; Rebs: Bliznyuk 11; Asts: Bliznyuk 12	boxscore	Pts: Gao Jin-Wei 19; Rebs: McCullough 9 Asts: Tsao Xun-Xiang 9	Arena: Taoyuan Arena; Attendance: 2,933; Referees: Lai Chien-Hao, Yeh Chun-Hung, Huang Shao-Po

November 22, 2025 Regular #028	Hsinchu Toplus Lioneers	98–113	Formosa Dreamers	Taichung City
14:30 (UTC+8)	Scoring by quarter: 21–27, 29–28, 21–27, 27–31
	Pts: Kao Kuo-Hao, Sword 28; Rebs: Holyfield 8 Asts: Pember, Liu Cheng-Hsun 3	boxscore	Pts: Holman 20; Rebs: Ennis 12; Asts: Holman 6	Arena: Taichung Intercontinental Basketball Stadium; Attendance: 3,000; Referees: Huang Chen-Feng, Peng Shih-Hsuan, Chen Ching-Hsiang

November 22, 2025 Regular #029	New Taipei Kings	101–103	Taoyuan Taiwan Beer Leopards	Taoyuan City
17:00 (UTC+8)	Scoring by quarter: 31–23, 28–31, 21–25, 21–24
	Pts: Sakakini 25; Rebs: Sakakini 10; Asts: Lee Kai-Yan 14	boxscore	Pts: Kromah 31; Rebs: Miller 12; Asts: Tsao Xun-Xiang 7	Arena: Taoyuan Arena; Attendance: 5,917; Referees: Sung Ming-Lu, Hsieh Shang-Chien, Chen Chien-Lin

November 23, 2025 Regular #030	Taipei Taishin Mars	117–128	Formosa Dreamers	Taichung City
14:30 (UTC+8)	Scoring by quarter: 32–37, 35–34, 22–35, 28–22
	Pts: Lofton 29; Rebs: Willis 14; Asts: Ting Sheng-Ju 3	boxscore	Pts: Ma Chien-Hao 27; Rebs: Holman 12; Asts: Thompkins, Lin Chun-Chi 6	Arena: Taichung Intercontinental Basketball Stadium; Attendance: 3,000; Referees: Chen Hung-Ming, Lo Kuo-Hsien, Wu Fang-Shan

November 23, 2025 Regular #031	New Taipei CTBC DEA	77–100	Taoyuan Taiwan Beer Leopards	Taoyuan City
17:00 (UTC+8)	Scoring by quarter: 27–26, 23–26, 13–22, 14–26
	Pts: Radović 19; Rebs: Radović 11; Asts: Lin Wei-Han, Radović 4	boxscore	Pts: Diallo 21; Rebs: McCullough, Diallo 13; Asts: Tsao Xun-Xiang 8	Arena: Taoyuan Arena; Attendance: 5,029; Referees: Chen Chao-Hung, Lin Chien-Hung, Ou Yang Yu-Hsien

=== Matchweek 8 ===
December 3, 2025 Regular #032	Hsinchu Toplus Lioneers	98–100	Taipei Taishin Mars	Taipei City
19:00 (UTC+8)	Scoring by quarter: 28–24, 27–23, 21–19, 22–34
	Pts: Pember 34; Rebs: Pember 13; Asts: Tseng Po-Yu 7	boxscore	Pts: Willis 29; Rebs: Willis 15; Asts: Xie Ming-Jun 4	Arena: Taipei Heping Basketball Gymnasium; Attendance: 3,158; Referees: Lin Chien-Hung, Yeh Chun-Hung, Huang Po-Wei

December 6, 2025 Regular #033	Hsinchu Toplus Lioneers	94–96	Taoyuan Taiwan Beer Leopards	Taoyuan City
14:30 (UTC+8)	Scoring by quarter: 24–27, 24–33, 18–23, 28–13
	Pts: Pember 20; Rebs: Pember 18; Asts: Liu Cheng-Hsun, Lu Kuan-Hsuan 4	boxscore	Pts: Diallo 20; Rebs: Miller 11; Asts: Kromah 9	Arena: Taoyuan Arena; Attendance: 5,827; Referees: Lai Chien-Hao, Lo Kuo-Hsien, Wu Fang-Shan

December 6, 2025 Regular #034	New Taipei CTBC DEA	108–104	Taipei Taishin Mars	Taipei City
17:00 (UTC+8)	Scoring by quarter: 23–24, 29–26, 28–28, 28–26
	Pts: Radović 26; Rebs: Todorović 11; Asts: Gaddefors 5	boxscore	Pts: Kidd 24; Rebs: Willis 10; Asts: Ting Sheng-Ju 8	Arena: Taipei Heping Basketball Gymnasium; Attendance: 5,169; Referees: Chen Chao-Hung, Huang Chen-Feng, Huang Shao-Po

December 7, 2025 Regular #035	Formosa Dreamers	92–105	Taoyuan Taiwan Beer Leopards	Taoyuan City
14:30 (UTC+8)	Scoring by quarter: 32–26, 14–26, 12–23, 34–30
	Pts: Holman 22; Rebs: Holman 16; Asts: Ennis 4	boxscore	Pts: Kromah 29; Rebs: Miller 13; Asts: Kromah 7	Arena: Taoyuan Arena; Attendance: 5,793; Referees: Hsieh Wen-Wei, Lin Chien-Hung, Hsu Wei-Kai

December 7, 2025 Regular #036	Kaohsiung Aquas	91–96(OT)	Taipei Taishin Mars	Taipei City
17:00 (UTC+8)	Scoring by quarter: 26–22, 20–24, 14–14, 23–23, Overtime: 8–13
	Pts: Bliznyuk 31; Rebs: Bliznyuk 13; Asts: Bliznyuk 8	boxscore	Pts: Willis 39; Rebs: Willis 20; Asts: Ting Sheng-Ju 9	Arena: Taipei Heping Basketball Gymnasium; Attendance: 4,086; Referees: Lo Kuo-Hsien, Chen Chien-Lin, Ou Yang Yu-Hsien

=== Matchweek 9 ===
December 13, 2025 Regular #037	Hsinchu Toplus Lioneers	89–99	Kaohsiung Aquas	Kaohsiung City
14:30 (UTC+8)	Scoring by quarter: 19–18, 30–22, 22–29, 18–30
	Pts: Pember 19; Rebs: Pember 17; Asts: Tseng Po-Yu 7	boxscore	Pts: Bliznyuk 20; Rebs: Krajina 10; Asts: Bliznyuk 11	Arena: Kaohsiung Arena; Attendance: 4,614; Referees: Huang Chen-Feng, Yeh Chun-Hung, Peng Shih-Hsuan

December 13, 2025 Regular #038	Taoyuan Taiwan Beer Leopards	75–85	New Taipei CTBC DEA	New Taipei City
17:00 (UTC+8)	Scoring by quarter: 16–15, 25–25, 21–20, 13–25
	Pts: Kromah 31; Rebs: Kromah 12; Asts: Tsao Xun-Xiang 5	boxscore	Pts: Todorović 26; Rebs: Todorović 17; Asts: Bachir, Hsieh Ya-Hsuan 5	Arena: Xinzhuang Gymnasium; Attendance: 5,231; Referees: Hsieh Shang-Chien, Yang Shih-Hsien, Wu Fang-Shan

December 14, 2025 Regular #039	Formosa Dreamers	99–73	Kaohsiung Aquas	Kaohsiung City
14:30 (UTC+8)	Scoring by quarter: 24–22, 28–16, 29–16, 18–19
	Pts: Gilbeck 20; Rebs: three players 11; Asts: Holman 5	boxscore	Pts: Ortiz 14; Rebs: Krajina 13; Asts: Bliznyuk 5	Arena: Kaohsiung Arena; Attendance: 5,016; Referees: Lo Kuo-Hsien, Lai Chien-Hao, Chen Ching-Hsiang

December 14, 2025 Regular #040	New Taipei Kings	111–114	New Taipei CTBC DEA	New Taipei City
17:00 (UTC+8)	Scoring by quarter: 28–29, 39–22, 22–31, 22–32
	Pts: Harris 31; Rebs: Washburn 8 Asts: J. Lin 7	boxscore	Pts: Todorović 34; Rebs: Todorović 17; Asts: Wei Chia-Hao, Hsieh Ya-Hsuan 7	Arena: Xinzhuang Gymnasium; Attendance: 5,063; Referees: Chen Hung-Ming, Sung Ming-Lu, Ou Yang Yu-Hsien

=== Matchweek 10 ===
December 20, 2025 Regular #041	Taoyuan Taiwan Beer Leopards	103–125	New Taipei Kings	New Taipei City
14:30 (UTC+8)	Scoring by quarter: 28–26, 26–37, 23–31, 26–31
	Pts: Kromah 23; Rebs: McCullough 12; Asts: Kromah 7	boxscore	Pts: Harris 27; Rebs: Washburn 12; Asts: J. Lin, Harris 6	Arena: Xinzhuang Gymnasium; Attendance: 4,362; Referees: Sung Ming-Lu, Huang Chen-Feng, Ou Yang Yu-Hsien

December 20, 2025 Regular #042	Formosa Dreamers	85–90	Hsinchu Toplus Lioneers	Hsinchu County
17:00 (UTC+8)	Scoring by quarter: 26–25, 21–21, 20–27, 18–17
	Pts: Holman 19; Rebs: Holman 18; Asts: Lu Kuan-Liang, Thompkins 5	boxscore	Pts: Tseng Po-Yu 17; Rebs: Pasečņiks 13; Asts: Tseng Po-Yu 8	Arena: Hsinchu County Stadium; Attendance: 4,817; Referees: Lin Chien-Hung, Lai Chien-Hao, Hsieh Shang-Chien

December 21, 2025 Regular #043	New Taipei CTBC DEA	78–85	New Taipei Kings	New Taipei City
14:30 (UTC+8)	Scoring by quarter: 17–17, 29–21, 13–20, 19–27
	Pts: Todorović 26; Rebs: Todorović 17; Asts: Hsieh Ya-Hsuan 6	boxscore	Pts: Lu Cheng-Ju, Washburn 18; Rebs: Gardner 14; Asts: Lee Kai-Yan 6	Arena: Xinzhuang Gymnasium; Attendance: 4,377; Referees: Chen Chao-Hung, Lo Kuo-Hsien, Wu Fang-Shan

December 21, 2025 Regular #044	Taipei Taishin Mars	94–83	Hsinchu Toplus Lioneers	Hsinchu County
17:00 (UTC+8)	Scoring by quarter: 24–23, 32–27, 22–22, 16–11
	Pts: Kidd 29; Rebs: Willis 22; Asts: Ting Sheng-Ju 10	boxscore	Pts: Holyfield 20; Rebs: Holyfield 11; Asts: Tseng Po-Yu 6	Arena: Hsinchu County Stadium; Attendance: 4,508; Referees: Chen Hung-Ming, Hsieh Wen-Wei, Yang Shih-Hsien

=== Matchweek 11 ===
December 24, 2025 Regular #045	Taoyuan Taiwan Beer Leopards	82–98	Hsinchu Toplus Lioneers	Hsinchu County
19:00 (UTC+8)	Scoring by quarter: 24–15, 20–33, 20–23, 18–27
	Pts: Miller 18; Rebs: Miller 16; Asts: Gao Jin-Wei 7	boxscore	Pts: Pember 32; Rebs: Pember 12; Asts: Tseng Po-Yu 9	Arena: Hsinchu County Stadium; Attendance: 4,158; Referees: Chen Chao-Hung, Yeh Chun-Hung, Chen Ching-Hsiang

December 27, 2025 Regular #046	Taipei Taishin Mars	98–108	Formosa Dreamers	Taichung City
14:30 (UTC+8)	Scoring by quarter: 21–28, 27–29, 23–19, 27–32
	Pts: Willis 35; Rebs: Willis 17; Asts: Ting Sheng-Ju 13	boxscore	Pts: Holman 22; Rebs: Holman 20; Asts: Chiang Yu-An 8	Arena: Taichung Intercontinental Basketball Stadium; Attendance: 3,000; Referees: Sung Ming-Lu, Yeh Chun-Hung, Wu Fang-Shan

December 27, 2025 Regular #047	Hsinchu Toplus Lioneers	97–90	New Taipei Kings	New Taipei City
17:00 (UTC+8)	Scoring by quarter: 29–26, 29–12, 11–31, 28–21
	Pts: Kao Kuo-Hao, Pasečņiks 18; Rebs: Pember 12; Asts: Tseng Po-Yu 6	boxscore	Pts: Washburn 30; Rebs: Washburn 18; Asts: J. Lin 6	Arena: Xinzhuang Gymnasium; Attendance: 3,868; Referees: Lin Chien-Hung, Peng Shih-Hsuan, Huang Shao-Po

December 28, 2025 Regular #048	New Taipei CTBC DEA	118–104	Formosa Dreamers	Taichung City
14:30 (UTC+8)	Scoring by quarter: 17–27, 26–22, 39–16, 36–39
	Pts: Todorović 33; Rebs: Todorović 19; Asts: Todorović 9	boxscore	Pts: Holman 29; Rebs: Gilbeck 15; Asts: Holman 5	Arena: Taichung Intercontinental Basketball Stadium; Attendance: 3,000; Referees: Huang Chen-Feng, Hsieh Shang-Chien, Ou Yang Yu-Hsien

December 28, 2025 Regular #049	Kaohsiung Aquas	82–86	New Taipei Kings	New Taipei City
17:00 (UTC+8)	Scoring by quarter: 25–18, 21–28, 23–16, 13–24
	Pts: Bliznyuk 22; Rebs: Krajina 17; Asts: Hu Long-Mao 4	boxscore	Pts: Harris 23; Rebs: Washburn 13; Asts: J. Lin 6	Arena: Xinzhuang Gymnasium; Attendance: 6,500; Referees: Chen Hung-Ming, Lai Chien-Hao, Chen Ching-Hsiang

=== Matchweek 12 ===
December 31, 2025 Regular #050	New Taipei Kings	82–94	New Taipei CTBC DEA	New Taipei City
19:00 (UTC+8)	Scoring by quarter: 20–25, 19–21, 23–31, 20–17
	Pts: Gardner 16; Rebs: Gardner 14; Asts: J. Lin 8	boxscore	Pts: Todorović 27; Rebs: Gaddefors 16; Asts: Hsieh Ya-Hsuan 7	Arena: Xinzhuang Gymnasium; Attendance: 4,143; Referees: Lo Kuo-Hsien, Yang Shih-Hsien, Huang Po-Wei

January 3, 2026 Regular #051	Taoyuan Taiwan Beer Leopards	108–102	Kaohsiung Aquas	Kaohsiung City
14:30 (UTC+8)	Scoring by quarter: 35–33, 22–25, 26–22, 25–22
	Pts: Diallo 22; Rebs: Diallo 11; Asts: Kromah 11	boxscore	Pts: Yu Huan-Ya 27; Rebs: Zagorac 8 Asts: Zagorac 6	Arena: Kaohsiung Arena; Attendance: 4,810; Referees: Chen Chao-Hung, Yeh Chun-Hung, Lo Kuo-Hsien

January 3, 2026 Regular #052	Hsinchu Toplus Lioneers	84–79	New Taipei CTBC DEA	New Taipei City
17:00 (UTC+8)	Scoring by quarter: 16–22, 23–8, 16–31, 29–18
	Pts: Pember 16; Rebs: Pasečņiks 14; Asts: Tseng Po-Yu 4	boxscore	Pts: Todorović 25; Rebs: Todorović 17; Asts: Bachir 6	Arena: Xinzhuang Gymnasium; Attendance: 4,872; Referees: Chen Hung-Ming, Hsieh Shang-Chien, Ou Yang Yu-Hsien

January 4, 2026 Regular #053	New Taipei Kings	111–94	Kaohsiung Aquas	Kaohsiung City
14:30 (UTC+8)	Scoring by quarter: 29–32, 32–22, 21–15, 29–25
	Pts: Harris 35; Rebs: Washburn 11; Asts: Harris 7	boxscore	Pts: Bliznyuk 21; Rebs: Bliznyuk 15; Asts: Bliznyuk 9	Arena: Kaohsiung Arena; Attendance: 4,761; Referees: Sung Ming-Lu, Peng Shih-Hsuan, Wu Fang-Shan

January 4, 2026 Regular #054	Formosa Dreamers	122–115	New Taipei CTBC DEA	New Taipei City
17:00 (UTC+8)	Scoring by quarter: 36–36, 38–19, 24–25, 24–35
	Pts: Chang Tsung-Hsien 25; Rebs: Holman 10; Asts: Chiang Yu-An 8	boxscore	Pts: Radović 26; Rebs: Radović 11; Asts: Bachir 9	Arena: Xinzhuang Gymnasium; Attendance: 4,091; Referees: Hsieh Wen-Wei, Lin Chien-Hung, Chen Chien-Lin

=== Matchweek 13 ===
January 7, 2026 Regular #055	Taipei Taishin Mars	103–108	Kaohsiung Aquas	Kaohsiung City
19:00 (UTC+8)	Scoring by quarter: 23–29, 30–31, 30–25, 20–23
	Pts: Willis, Kidd 25; Rebs: Willis 20; Asts: Ting Sheng-Ju 8	boxscore	Pts: Bliznyuk 33; Rebs: Krajina 11; Asts: Bliznyuk, Krajina 6	Arena: Kaohsiung Arena; Attendance: 2,815; Referees: Chen Chao-Hung, Yang Shih-Hsien, Huang Shao-Po

January 9, 2026 Regular #056	New Taipei Kings	87–110	Taoyuan Taiwan Beer Leopards	Taoyuan City
19:00 (UTC+8)	Scoring by quarter: 24–31, 25–27, 17–27, 21–25
	Pts: Harris 21; Rebs: Washburn 13; Asts: J. Lin 6	boxscore	Pts: Kromah 24; Rebs: Diallo 12; Asts: Tsao Xun-Xiang 7	Arena: Taoyuan City Zhongli Civil Sports Center; Attendance: 2,000; Referees: Lai Chien-Hao, Huang Chen-Feng, Chen Ching-Hsiang

January 10, 2026 Regular #057	New Taipei CTBC DEA	111–114	Kaohsiung Aquas	Kaohsiung City
14:30 (UTC+8)	Scoring by quarter: 23–33, 39–27, 19–32, 30–22
	Pts: Todorović 32; Rebs: Todorović 20; Asts: Lin Wei-Han 7	boxscore	Pts: Krajina 29; Rebs: Bliznyuk, Krajina 10; Asts: Yu Huan-Ya 8	Arena: Kaohsiung Arena; Attendance: 4,950; Referees: Yeh Chun-Hung, Hsieh Shang-Chien, Huang Po-Wei

January 10, 2026 Regular #058	Formosa Dreamers	110–91	Taipei Taishin Mars	Taipei City
17:00 (UTC+8)	Scoring by quarter: 21–23, 30–25, 33–23, 26–20
	Pts: Ma Chien-Hao 20; Rebs: Thompkins 14; Asts: Thompkins, Lin Chun-Chi 4	boxscore	Pts: Stone 27; Rebs: Stone 9 Asts: Ting Sheng-Ju 6	Arena: Taipei Heping Basketball Gymnasium; Attendance: 5,162; Referees: Lo Kuo-Hsien, Lai Chien-Hao, Wu Fang-Shan

January 11, 2026 Regular #059	Hsinchu Toplus Lioneers	95–79	Kaohsiung Aquas	Kaohsiung City
14:30 (UTC+8)	Scoring by quarter: 24–25, 31–14, 23–27, 17–13
	Pts: Pember 27; Rebs: Pember 13; Asts: Tseng Po-Yu 9	boxscore	Pts: Bliznyuk 28; Rebs: Bliznyuk, Krajina 8 Asts: Krajina 3	Arena: Kaohsiung Arena; Attendance: 4,858; Referees: Huang Chen-Feng, Yang Shih-Hsien, Ou Yang Yu-Hsien

January 11, 2026 Regular #060	Taoyuan Taiwan Beer Leopards	108–114	Taipei Taishin Mars	Taipei City
17:00 (UTC+8)	Scoring by quarter: 23–40, 32–23, 24–23, 29–28
	Pts: Kromah 31; Rebs: Diallo 15; Asts: Gao Jin-Wei 9	boxscore	Pts: Stone 28; Rebs: Stone 12; Asts: Ting Sheng-Ju 8	Arena: Taipei Heping Basketball Gymnasium; Attendance: 4,071; Referees: Lin Chien-Hung, Sung Ming-Lu, Hsu Wei-Kai

=== Matchweek 14 ===
January 17, 2026 Regular #061	New Taipei Kings	96–116	Formosa Dreamers	Taichung City
14:30 (UTC+8)	Scoring by quarter: 24–23, 24–40, 25–26, 23–27
	Pts: Harris 20; Rebs: Daye 8 Asts: J. Lin 7	boxscore	Pts: Bentil 29; Rebs: Gilbeck, Bentil 12; Asts: Chiang Yu-An 7	Arena: Taichung Intercontinental Basketball Stadium; Attendance: 3,000; Referees: Sung Ming-Lu, Peng Shih-Hsuan, Hsu Wei-Kai

January 17, 2026 Regular #062	New Taipei CTBC DEA	95–79	Taipei Taishin Mars	Taipei City
17:00 (UTC+8)	Scoring by quarter: 19–26, 26–17, 23–22, 27–14
	Pts: Todorović 24; Rebs: Todorović 22; Asts: Lin Wei-Han 10	boxscore	Pts: Kidd 24; Rebs: Chien, Stone 6 Asts: Kidd 7	Arena: Taipei Heping Basketball Gymnasium; Attendance: 4,550; Referees: Huang Chen-Feng, Yeh Chun-Hung, Huang Shao-Po

January 18, 2026 Regular #063	Taoyuan Taiwan Beer Leopards	98–91	Formosa Dreamers	Taichung City
14:30 (UTC+8)	Scoring by quarter: 20–27, 25–27, 26–18, 27–19
	Pts: Kromah 22; Rebs: Kromah 11; Asts: Gao Jin-Wei 8	boxscore	Pts: Ma Chien-Hao 23; Rebs: Gilbeck 17; Asts: Chiang Yu-An 4	Arena: Taichung Intercontinental Basketball Stadium; Attendance: 3,000; Referees: Lai Chien-Hao, Lo Kuo-Hsien, Hsieh Shang-Chien

January 18, 2026 Regular #064	Hsinchu Toplus Lioneers	101–98	Taipei Taishin Mars	Taipei City
17:00 (UTC+8)	Scoring by quarter: 22–19, 25–24, 23–29, 31–26
	Pts: Kao Kuo-Hao 32; Rebs: Pember, Pasečņiks 11; Asts: Tseng Po-Yu 8	boxscore	Pts: Maker 25; Rebs: Kidd 14; Asts: Ting Sheng-Ju 6	Arena: Taipei Heping Basketball Gymnasium; Attendance: 4,075; Referees: Chen Chao-Hung, Hsieh Wen-Wei, Chen Ching-Hsiang

=== Matchweek 15 ===
January 24, 2025 Regular #065	Kaohsiung Aquas	91–133	New Taipei CTBC DEA	New Taipei City
14:30 (UTC+8)	Scoring by quarter: 30–24, 22–38, 23–37, 16–34
	Pts: Odigie 29; Rebs: Odigie 8 Asts: Chen Huai-An 5	boxscore	Pts: Todorović 29; Rebs: Todorović 9 Asts: Lin Wei-Han 14	Arena: Xinzhuang Gymnasium; Attendance: 4,006; Referees: Lin Chien-Hung, Lai Chien-Hao, Huang Po-Wei

January 24, 2025 Regular #066	Formosa Dreamers	91–95	Hsinchu Toplus Lioneers	Hsinchu County
17:00 (UTC+8)	Scoring by quarter: 26–25, 21–22, 21–22, 23–26
	Pts: Lin Chun-Chi 20; Rebs: Bentil 13; Asts: Lin Chun-Chi 7	boxscore	Pts: Pember 23; Rebs: Holyfield 10; Asts: Tseng Po-Yu 6	Arena: Hsinchu County Stadium; Attendance: 5,897; Referees: Lo Kuo-Hsien, Chen Chien-Lin, Ou Yang Yu-Hsien

January 25, 2025 Regular #067	Taipei Taishin Mars	112–104	New Taipei CTBC DEA	New Taipei City
14:30 (UTC+8)	Scoring by quarter: 34–24, 15–29, 37–26, 26–25
	Pts: Maker 32; Rebs: Maker 11; Asts: Ting Sheng-Ju 10	boxscore	Pts: Todorović 29; Rebs: Todorović 11; Asts: Lin Wei-Han 9	Arena: Xinzhuang Gymnasium; Attendance: 4,165; Referees: Peng Shih-Hsuan, Sung Ming-Lu, Yang Shih-Hsien

January 25, 2025 Regular #068	New Taipei Kings	94–87	Hsinchu Toplus Lioneers	Hsinchu County
17:00 (UTC+8)	Scoring by quarter: 23–24, 30–22, 21–21, 20–20
	Pts: Gardner 22; Rebs: Olujobi 14; Asts: J. Lin 7	boxscore	Pts: Pember 21; Rebs: Pember, Pasečņiks 10; Asts: Tseng Po-Yu 7	Arena: Hsinchu County Stadium; Attendance: 5,559; Referees: Chen Hung-Ming, Huang Chen-Feng, Wu Fang-Shan

=== Matchweek 16 ===
January 31, 2026 Regular #069	New Taipei Kings	114–97	Formosa Dreamers	Taichung City
14:30 (UTC+8)	Scoring by quarter: 26–28, 33–17, 28–28, 27–24
	Pts: J. Lin 36; Rebs: Tolbert 15; Asts: J. Lin 8	boxscore	Pts: Bentil 20; Rebs: Bentil 15; Asts: Chiang Yu-An 5	Arena: Taichung Intercontinental Basketball Stadium; Attendance: 2,778; Referees: Chen Hung-Ming, Sung Ming-Lu, Hsu Wei-Kai

January 31, 2026 Regular #070	Hsinchu Toplus Lioneers	88–92	Taoyuan Taiwan Beer Leopards	Taoyuan City
17:00 (UTC+8)	Scoring by quarter: 24–24, 21–25, 22–18, 21–25
	Pts: Pember 17; Rebs: Holyfield 12; Asts: Tseng Po-Yu 7	boxscore	Pts: Kromah 26; Rebs: Kromah 13; Asts: Gao Jin-Wei, Kromah 6	Arena: Taoyuan City Zhongli Civil Sports Center; Attendance: 2,000; Referees: Yeh Chun-Hung, Peng Shih-Hsuan, Ou Yang Yu-Hsien

February 1, 2026 Regular #071	Kaohsiung Aquas	93–96	Formosa Dreamers	Taichung City
14:30 (UTC+8)	Scoring by quarter: 25–31, 21–28, 25–22, 22–15
	Pts: Yu Huan-Ya 22; Rebs: Tang Wei-Chieh, Lu Wei-Ting 10; Asts: Yu Huan-Ya 10	boxscore	Pts: Bentil 23; Rebs: Gilbeck, Boyd 12; Asts: Chiang Yu-An 8	Arena: Taichung Intercontinental Basketball Stadium; Attendance: 2,899; Referees: Lin Chien-Hung, Lin Yuan-Dian, Huang Po-Wei

February 1, 2026 Regular #072	Taipei Taishin Mars	87–98	Taoyuan Taiwan Beer Leopards	Taoyuan City
17:00 (UTC+8)	Scoring by quarter: 21–21, 20–31, 22–29, 24–17
	Pts: Kidd 19; Rebs: Maker 20; Asts: Ting Sheng-Ju, Manu 4	boxscore	Pts: McCullough 26; Rebs: McCullough 15; Asts: Kromah, Tsao Xun-Xiang 5	Arena: Taoyuan City Zhongli Civil Sports Center; Attendance: 2,000; Referees: Chen Chao-Hung, Huang Chen-Feng, Chen Chien-Lin

=== Matchweek 17 ===
February 7, 2026 Regular #073	Taoyuan Taiwan Beer Leopards	101–75	Kaohsiung Aquas	Kaohsiung City
14:30 (UTC+8)	Scoring by quarter: 23–14, 31–24, 27–14, 20–23
	Pts: Diallo 24; Rebs: Diallo 12; Asts: Kromah 8	boxscore	Pts: Wu Siao-Jin, Zagorac 13; Rebs: Zagorac, Odigie 8 Asts: Wei Liang-Che, Zagorac 3	Arena: Kaohsiung Arena; Attendance: 5,075; Referees: Chen Hung-Ming, Yang Shih-Hsien, Huang Shao-Po

February 7, 2026 Regular #074	New Taipei Kings	98–96	Taipei Taishin Mars	Taipei City
17:00 (UTC+8)	Scoring by quarter: 26–27, 20–21, 28–30, 24–18
	Pts: Olujobi 25; Rebs: Olujobi, Daye 9 Asts: Lin Yan-Ting, Daye 7	boxscore	Pts: Maker 48; Rebs: Maker 16; Asts: Ting Sheng-Ju 10	Arena: Taipei Heping Basketball Gymnasium; Attendance: 5,176; Referees: Chuang Chih-Chun, Lin Tsung-Yun, Hsieh Shang-Chien

February 8, 2026 Regular #075	New Taipei CTBC DEA	113–84	Kaohsiung Aquas	Kaohsiung City
14:30 (UTC+8)	Scoring by quarter: 29–18, 31–27, 23–16, 30–23
	Pts: Todorović 26; Rebs: Radović 11; Asts: Lin Wei-Han 7	boxscore	Pts: Odigie 18; Rebs: Krajina, Odigie 11; Asts: Chen Huai-An 8	Arena: Kaohsiung Arena; Attendance: 4,659; Referees: Lo Kuo-Hsien, Yeh Chun-Hung, Chen Ching-Hsiang

February 8, 2026 Regular #076	Formosa Dreamers	104–91	Taipei Taishin Mars	Taipei City
17:00 (UTC+8)	Scoring by quarter: 20–21, 26–25, 34–29, 24–16
	Pts: Bentil 27; Rebs: Bentil 20; Asts: Chiang Yu-An 8	boxscore	Pts: Maker 34; Rebs: Maker 22; Asts: Ting Sheng-Ju 8	Arena: Taipei Heping Basketball Gymnasium; Attendance: 4,520; Referees: Hsieh Wen-Wei, Lai Chien-Hao, Wu Fang-Shan

=== Matchweek 18 ===
February 11, 2026 Regular #077	Kaohsiung Aquas	104–90	Taipei Taishin Mars	Taipei City
19:00 (UTC+8)	Scoring by quarter: 34–25, 23–29, 21–16, 26–20
	Pts: Zagorac 28; Rebs: Krajina 15; Asts: Chen Huai-An 5	boxscore	Pts: Ting Sheng-Ju 29; Rebs: Manu, Huang Tsung-Han 5 Asts: Ting Sheng-Ju 5	Arena: Taipei Heping Basketball Gymnasium; Attendance: 3,291; Referees: Chen Chao-Hung, Huang Chen-Feng, Yang Shih-Hsien

February 14, 2026 Regular #078	Taipei Taishin Mars	95–116	New Taipei Kings	New Taipei City
14:30 (UTC+8)	Scoring by quarter: 27–37, 29–33, 25–28, 14–18
	Pts: Huang Tsung-Han 22; Rebs: Manu 12; Asts: Manu, Xie Ming-Jun 4	boxscore	Pts: Olujobi 21; Rebs: Tolbert 13; Asts: three players 5	Arena: Xinzhuang Gymnasium; Attendance: 3,833; Referees: Lo Kuo-Hsien, Lai Chien-Hao, Wu Fang-Shan

February 14, 2026 Regular #079	Formosa Dreamers	100–98	Taoyuan Taiwan Beer Leopards	Taoyuan City
17:00 (UTC+8)	Scoring by quarter: 21–26, 27–19, 27–23, 25–30
	Pts: Bentil 20; Rebs: Holman 10; Asts: Lin Chun-Chi, Holman 5	boxscore	Pts: Miller 23; Rebs: Diallo 18; Asts: Gao Jin-Wei 8	Arena: Taoyuan City Zhongli Civil Sports Center; Attendance: 2,000; Referees: Chen Hung-Ming, Hsieh Wen-Wei, Yeh Chun-Hung

February 15, 2026 Regular #080	Hsinchu Toplus Lioneers	85–100	New Taipei Kings	New Taipei City
14:30 (UTC+8)	Scoring by quarter: 27–27, 26–17, 10–32, 22–24
	Pts: Holyfield 20; Rebs: Holyfield 13; Asts: Kao Kuo-Hao, Tseng Po-Yu 4	boxscore	Pts: Washburn 26; Rebs: Washburn 13; Asts: J. Lin 15	Arena: Xinzhuang Gymnasium; Attendance: 4,059; Referees: Ho Chang-Jen, Lin Yuan-Dian, Lin Tsung-Yun

February 15, 2026 Regular #081	New Taipei CTBC DEA	93–96	Taoyuan Taiwan Beer Leopards	Taoyuan City
17:00 (UTC+8)	Scoring by quarter: 20–21, 21–20, 32–31, 20–24
	Pts: Todorović 20; Rebs: Radović 15; Asts: Hsieh Ya-Hsuan 7	boxscore	Pts: Gao Jin-Wei 29; Rebs: Diallo 15; Asts: McCullough 7	Arena: Taoyuan City Zhongli Civil Sports Center; Attendance: 2,000; Referees: Sung Ming-Lu, Peng Shih-Hsuan, Hsieh Shang-Chien

=== Matchweek 19 ===
March 4, 2026 Regular #082	Taoyuan Taiwan Beer Leopards	116–100	New Taipei Kings	New Taipei City
19:00 (UTC+8)	Scoring by quarter: 29–35, 35–23, 30–19, 22–23
	Pts: Kromah 30; Rebs: McCullough 18; Asts: Kromah 9	boxscore	Pts: Lin Yan-Ting 20; Rebs: Tolbert 16; Asts: J. Lin 14	Arena: Xinzhuang Gymnasium; Attendance: 3,367; Referees: Chen Hung-Ming, Lin Chien-Hung, Wu Fang-Shan

March 6, 2026 Regular #083	Taipei Taishin Mars	90–93	New Taipei Kings	New Taipei City
19:00 (UTC+8)	Scoring by quarter: 28–27, 19–25, 21–21, 22–20
	Pts: Ndoye 19; Rebs: Ndoye 17; Asts: Ting Sheng-Ju 8	boxscore	Pts: Washburn 22; Rebs: Olujobi 11; Asts: J. Lin 10	Arena: Xinzhuang Gymnasium; Attendance: 3,716; Referees: Hsieh Wen-Wei, Yang Shih-Hsien, Chen Ching-Hsiang

March 7, 2026 Regular #084	Formosa Dreamers	107–97	Kaohsiung Aquas	Kaohsiung City
14:30 (UTC+8)	Scoring by quarter: 28–23, 24–28, 33–27, 22–19
	Pts: Thompkins, Bentil 22; Rebs: Holman 14; Asts: Chiang Yu-An, Holman 4	boxscore	Pts: Maldonado 30; Rebs: Krajina 9 Asts: Maldonado, Krajina 4	Arena: Kaohsiung Arena; Attendance: 6,051; Referees: Lai Chien-Hao, Lo Kuo-Hsien, Lin Tsung-Yun

March 7, 2026 Regular #085	Hsinchu Toplus Lioneers	114–111	Taoyuan Taiwan Beer Leopards	Taoyuan City
17:00 (UTC+8)	Scoring by quarter: 28–31, 26–30, 33–33, 27–17
	Pts: Kao Kuo-Hao 24; Rebs: Pember 14; Asts: Tseng Po-Yu 7	boxscore	Pts: Kromah 42; Rebs: Diallo, Miller 8 Asts: Gao Jin-Wei, Kromah 4	Arena: Taoyuan City Zhongli Civil Sports Center; Attendance: 2,000; Referees: Lin Yuan-Dian, Hsieh Shang-Chien, Ou Yang Yu-Hsien

March 8, 2026 Regular #086	New Taipei CTBC DEA	88–90	Kaohsiung Aquas	Kaohsiung City
14:30 (UTC+8)	Scoring by quarter: 24–26, 19–16, 30–30, 15–18
	Pts: Bachir 19; Rebs: Todorović 16; Asts: Lin Wei-Han 6	boxscore	Pts: Su Wen-Ju 20; Rebs: Krajina 12; Asts: Yu Huan-Ya 7	Arena: Kaohsiung Arena; Attendance: 3,908; Referees: Ho Chang-Jen, Lin Chien-Hung, Yeh Yen-Hsi

March 8, 2026 Regular #087	New Taipei Kings	114–101	Taoyuan Taiwan Beer Leopards	Taoyuan City
17:00 (UTC+8)	Scoring by quarter: 24–21, 34–23, 28–24, 28–33
	Pts: Harris 42; Rebs: Olujobi 11; Asts: J. Lin 12	boxscore	Pts: McCullough 29; Rebs: McCullough 13; Asts: Gao Jin-Wei 7	Arena: Taoyuan City Zhongli Civil Sports Center; Attendance: 2,000; Referees: Chuang Chih-Chun, Huang Chen-Feng, Huang Po-Wei

=== Matchweek 20 ===
March 11, 2026 Regular #088	Taipei Taishin Mars	102–94	Hsinchu Toplus Lioneers	Hsinchu County
19:00 (UTC+8)	Scoring by quarter: 29–32, 29–23, 18–28, 26–11
	Pts: Willis 24; Rebs: Willis, Ndoye 11; Asts: Ting Sheng-Ju 9	boxscore	Pts: Pember 28; Rebs: Pember 15; Asts: Tseng Po-Yu 10	Arena: Hsinchu County Stadium; Attendance: 3,411; Referees: Sung Ming-Lu, Lo Kuo-Hsien, Huang Shao-Po

March 14, 2026 Regular #089	New Taipei CTBC DEA	91–100	Formosa Dreamers	Taichung City
14:30 (UTC+8)	Scoring by quarter: 22–25, 18–20, 33–36, 18–19
	Pts: Bachir 24; Rebs: Todorović 15; Asts: Lin Wei-Han 7	boxscore	Pts: Walko, Holman 20; Rebs: Bentil 9 Asts: Chiang Yu-An 6	Arena: Taichung Intercontinental Basketball Stadium; Attendance: 2,290; Referees: Huang Chen-Feng, Peng Shih-Hsuan, Chen Chien-Lin

March 14, 2026 Regular #090	Kaohsiung Aquas	97–113	Hsinchu Toplus Lioneers	Hsinchu County
17:00 (UTC+8)	Scoring by quarter: 18–33, 22–24, 33–24, 24–32
	Pts: Maldonado 23; Rebs: Maldonado 13; Asts: Su Wen-Ju 7	boxscore	Pts: Pember 28; Rebs: Pember 14; Asts: Tseng Po-Yu 10	Arena: Hsinchu County Stadium; Attendance: 5,217; Referees: Chen Chao-Hung, Yang Shih-Hsien, Wu Fang-Shan

March 15, 2026 Regular #091	Taoyuan Taiwan Beer Leopards	84–111	Formosa Dreamers	Taichung City
14:30 (UTC+8)	Scoring by quarter: 32–33, 24–29, 15–24, 13–25
	Pts: Diallo 27; Rebs: Diallo 8 Asts: Kromah 7	boxscore	Pts: Bentil 20; Rebs: Thompkins 13; Asts: Chiang Yu-An 6	Arena: Taichung Intercontinental Basketball Stadium; Attendance: 2,556; Referees: Chen Hung-Ming, Hsieh Wen-Wei, Sung Ming-Lu

March 15, 2026 Regular #092	New Taipei Kings	90–113	Hsinchu Toplus Lioneers	Hsinchu County
17:00 (UTC+8)	Scoring by quarter: 26–25, 21–34, 24–20, 19–34
	Pts: Washburn 26; Rebs: Washburn 11; Asts: Lin Yan-Ting 8	boxscore	Pts: Marić 29; Rebs: Marić 16; Asts: Kao Kuo-Hao 9	Arena: Hsinchu County Stadium; Attendance: 4,807; Referees: Lin Chien-Hung, Lai Chien-Hao, Hsieh Shang-Chien

=== Matchweek 21 ===
March 21, 2026 Regular #093	Kaohsiung Aquas	91–118	New Taipei CTBC DEA	New Taipei City
14:30 (UTC+8)	Scoring by quarter: 24–26, 18–29, 23–35, 26–28
	Pts: Lu Wei-Ting 20; Rebs: Lu Wei-Ting 8 Asts: Su Wen-Ju 4	boxscore	Pts: Beech 24; Rebs: Todorović 8 Asts: Todorović 8	Arena: Xinzhuang Gymnasium; Attendance: 4,059; Referees: Yeh Chun-Hung, Hsieh Shang-Chien, Huang Shao-Po

March 21, 2026 Regular #094	Taoyuan Taiwan Beer Leopards	99–73	Taipei Taishin Mars	Taipei City
17:00 (UTC+8)	Scoring by quarter: 32–27, 23–18, 22–12, 22–16
	Pts: Kromah 22; Rebs: Diallo 12; Asts: Kromah 10	boxscore	Pts: Willis 17; Rebs: Ndoye 16; Asts: Ting Sheng-Ju 9	Arena: Taipei Heping Basketball Gymnasium; Attendance: 5,076; Referees: Huang Chen-Feng, Yang Shih-Hsien, Yeh Yen-Hsi

March 22, 2026 Regular #095	Hsinchu Toplus Lioneers	75–95	New Taipei CTBC DEA	New Taipei City
14:30 (UTC+8)	Scoring by quarter: 12–25, 24–26, 18–23, 21–21
	Pts: Marić 12; Rebs: Marić 12; Asts: Kao Kuo-Hao 5	boxscore	Pts: Todorović 31; Rebs: Todorović 18; Asts: Lin Wei-Han 8	Arena: Xinzhuang Gymnasium; Attendance: 4,255; Referees: Chen Chao-Hung, Hsieh Wen-Wei, Chen Chien-Lin

March 22, 2026 Regular #096	Formosa Dreamers	118–96	Taipei Taishin Mars	Taipei City
17:00 (UTC+8)	Scoring by quarter: 34–23, 26–29, 32–16, 26–28
	Pts: Bentil 32; Rebs: Bentil 14; Asts: Holman 8	boxscore	Pts: Willis 29; Rebs: Willis 16; Asts: Maker 6	Arena: Taipei Heping Basketball Gymnasium; Attendance: 3,984; Referees: Lai Chien-Hao, Peng Shih-Hsuan, Ou Yang Yu-Hsien

=== Matchweek 22 ===
March 25, 2026 Regular #097	Kaohsiung Aquas	90–96	Formosa Dreamers	Taichung City
19:00 (UTC+8)	Scoring by quarter: 16–29, 28–26, 25–15, 21–26
	Pts: Maldonado 23; Rebs: Želionis, Maldonado 10; Asts: Maldonado 8	boxscore	Pts: Lin Chun-Chi 20; Rebs: Holman 13; Asts: Lin Chun-Chi 5	Arena: Taichung Intercontinental Basketball Stadium; Attendance: 3,000; Referees: Sung Ming-Lu, Huang Chen-Feng, Chen Ching-Hsiang

March 27, 2026 Regular #098	New Taipei Kings	90–107	Formosa Dreamers	Taichung City
19:00 (UTC+8)	Scoring by quarter: 31–36, 24–28, 20–20, 15–23
	Pts: Harris 21; Rebs: Washburn 12; Asts: Harris 7	boxscore	Pts: Thompkins 23; Rebs: Holman 9 Asts: Chiang Yu-An 7	Arena: Taichung Intercontinental Basketball Stadium; Attendance: 3,000; Referees: Lin Yuan-Dian, Lo Kuo-Hsien, Huang Po-Wei

March 28, 2026 Regular #099	New Taipei CTBC DEA	99–103	Hsinchu Toplus Lioneers	Hsinchu County
14:30 (UTC+8)	Scoring by quarter: 28–23, 24–39, 19–27, 28–14
	Pts: Bachir 25; Rebs: Todorović 11; Asts: Lin Wei-Han 9	boxscore	Pts: Pember 20; Rebs: Marić 15; Asts: Tseng Po-Yu 5	Arena: Hsinchu County Stadium; Attendance: 5,291; Referees: Chuang Chih-Chun, Lin Chien-Hung, Wu Fang-Shan

March 28, 2026 Regular #100	Kaohsiung Aquas	112–104	Taipei Taishin Mars	Taipei City
17:00 (UTC+8)	Scoring by quarter: 27–31, 30–22, 25–21, 30–30
	Pts: Maldonado 31; Rebs: Želionis 15; Asts: Maldonado 13	boxscore	Pts: Maker 26; Rebs: Willis 13; Asts: Ting Sheng-Ju, Manu 6	Arena: Taipei Heping Basketball Gymnasium; Attendance: 4,658; Referees: Yeh Chun-Hung, Peng Shih-Hsuan, Yang Shih-Hsien

March 29, 2026 Regular #101	Taoyuan Taiwan Beer Leopards	91–102	Hsinchu Toplus Lioneers	Hsinchu County
14:30 (UTC+8)	Scoring by quarter: 15–16, 26–20, 21–32, 29–34
	Pts: Kromah 31; Rebs: Miller 12; Asts: Gao Jin-Wei, Kromah 6	boxscore	Pts: Kao Kuo-Hao 20; Rebs: Pember 19; Asts: Lu Kuan-Hsuan 6	Arena: Hsinchu County Stadium; Attendance: 5,007; Referees: Chen Chao-Hung, Lai Chien-Hao, Hsu Wei-Kai

March 29, 2026 Regular #102	New Taipei Kings	116–102	Taipei Taishin Mars	Taipei City
17:00 (UTC+8)	Scoring by quarter: 20–26, 30–25, 33–16, 33–35
	Pts: J. Lin, Harris 23; Rebs: Washburn 9 Asts: J. Lin 6	boxscore	Pts: Maker 39; Rebs: Maker 11; Asts: Ting Sheng-Ju 8	Arena: Taipei Heping Basketball Gymnasium; Attendance: 4,395; Referees: Ho Chang-Jen, Lin Tsung-Yun, Hsieh Shang-Chien

=== Matchweek 23 ===
April 1, 2026 Regular #103	Taipei Taishin Mars	91–89	New Taipei CTBC DEA	New Taipei City
19:00 (UTC+8)	Scoring by quarter: 13–27, 29–20, 31–23, 18–19
	Pts: Willis 28; Rebs: Willis 18; Asts: Ting Sheng-Ju 10	boxscore	Pts: Bachir 25; Rebs: Todorović 12; Asts: Lin Wei-Han 6	Arena: Xinzhuang Gymnasium; Attendance: 3,092; Referees: Chuang Chih-Chun, Huang Chen-Feng, Huang Shao-Po

April 4, 2026 Regular #104	Formosa Dreamers	104–108	New Taipei CTBC DEA	New Taipei City
14:30 (UTC+8)	Scoring by quarter: 23–23, 32–25, 26–31, 23–29
	Pts: Chiang Yu-An 29; Rebs: Holman 10; Asts: Chang Tsung-Hsien 7	boxscore	Pts: Radović 23; Rebs: Gaddefors 13; Asts: Bachir 8	Arena: Xinzhuang Gymnasium; Attendance: 4,880; Referees: Ho Chang-Jen, Lo Kuo-Hsien, Lin Tsung-Yun

April 4, 2026 Regular #105	Kaohsiung Aquas	74–105	Taoyuan Taiwan Beer Leopards	Taoyuan City
17:00 (UTC+8)	Scoring by quarter: 19–23, 22–27, 22–21, 11–34
	Pts: Želionis 21; Rebs: Želionis 13; Asts: Hu Long-Mao, Su Wen-Ju 5	boxscore	Pts: Kromah 21; Rebs: Diallo 15; Asts: Kromah 6	Arena: Taoyuan City Zhongli Civil Sports Center; Attendance: 2,000; Referees: Peng Shih-Hsuan, Hsieh Shang-Chien, Ou Yang Yu-Hsien

April 5, 2026 Regular #106	New Taipei Kings	78–98	New Taipei CTBC DEA	New Taipei City
14:30 (UTC+8)	Scoring by quarter: 20–25, 15–26, 22–30, 21–17
	Pts: Harris 25; Rebs: Washburn 12; Asts: J. Lin, Harris 4	boxscore	Pts: Gaddefors 20; Rebs: Gaddefors 15; Asts: Hsieh Ya-Hsuan 8	Arena: Xinzhuang Gymnasium; Attendance: 4,983; Referees: Chen Chao-Hung, Yang Shih-Hsien, Wu Fang-Shan

April 5, 2026 Regular #107	Taipei Taishin Mars	96–107	Taoyuan Taiwan Beer Leopards	Taoyuan City
17:00 (UTC+8)	Scoring by quarter: 34–29, 17–30, 22–23, 23–25
	Pts: Maker 29; Rebs: Maker 17; Asts: Ting Sheng-Ju, Ndoye 6	boxscore	Pts: Kromah 26; Rebs: McCullough 10; Asts: Kromah 7	Arena: Taoyuan City Zhongli Civil Sports Center; Attendance: 2,000; Referees: Huang Chen-Feng, Sung Ming-Lu, Hsu Wei-Kai

=== Matchweek 24 ===
April 8, 2026 Regular #108	New Taipei CTBC DEA	100–117	Hsinchu Toplus Lioneers	Hsinchu County
19:00 (UTC+8)	Scoring by quarter: 23–39, 28–32, 29–25, 20–21
	Pts: Radović 32; Rebs: Radović 13; Asts: Bachir 6	boxscore	Pts: Kao Kuo-Hao 26; Rebs: Pember 11; Asts: Kao Kuo-Hao, Holyfield 6	Arena: Hsinchu County Stadium; Attendance: 3,327; Referees: Lo Kuo-Hsien, Lai Chien-Hao, Huang Po-Wei

April 11, 2026 Regular #109	New Taipei Kings	112–111	Kaohsiung Aquas	Kaohsiung City
14:30 (UTC+8)	Scoring by quarter: 34–32, 32–21, 21–27, 25–31
	Pts: Harris 32; Rebs: Washburn 11; Asts: Harris 6	boxscore	Pts: Želionis 26; Rebs: Krajina 13; Asts: Maldonado 8	Arena: Kaohsiung Arena; Attendance: 5,299; Referees: Hsieh Wen-Wei, Yeh Chun-Hung, Chen Ching-Hsiang

April 11, 2026 Regular #110	Taoyuan Taiwan Beer Leopards	76–79	Hsinchu Toplus Lioneers	Hsinchu County
17:00 (UTC+8)	Scoring by quarter: 20–15, 27–27, 13–24, 16–13
	Pts: Miller 28; Rebs: McCullough 18; Asts: Kromah 6	boxscore	Pts: Holyfield 14; Rebs: Marić 11; Asts: Kao Kuo-Hao 6	Arena: Hsinchu County Stadium; Attendance: 6,012; Referees: Chen Chao-Hung, Lin Yuan-Dian, Chen Chien-Lin

April 12, 2026 Regular #111	Taipei Taishin Mars	104–93	Kaohsiung Aquas	Kaohsiung City
14:30 (UTC+8)	Scoring by quarter: 21–16, 22–23, 31–32, 30–22
	Pts: Ndoye 37; Rebs: Ndoye 23; Asts: Ting Sheng-Ju 16	boxscore	Pts: Shih Chin-Yao 25; Rebs: Krajina 17; Asts: Krajina 7	Arena: Kaohsiung Arena; Attendance: 3,188; Referees: Lai Chien-Hao, Peng Shih-Hsuan, Yeh Yen-Hsi

April 12, 2026 Regular #112	Formosa Dreamers	94–85	Hsinchu Toplus Lioneers	Hsinchu County
17:00 (UTC+8)	Scoring by quarter: 19–34, 25–30, 30–11, 20–10
	Pts: Holman 32; Rebs: Holman 16; Asts: Lin Chun-Chi 7	boxscore	Pts: Marić 19; Rebs: Marić 15; Asts: Tseng Po-Yu 6	Arena: Hsinchu County Stadium; Attendance: 5,541; Referees: Lin Chien-Hung, Sung Ming-Lu, Wu Fang-Shan

=== Matchweek 25 ===
April 18, 2026 Regular #113	Taipei Taishin Mars	66–99	Formosa Dreamers	Taichung City
14:30 (UTC+8)	Scoring by quarter: 27–24, 14–31, 16–31, 9–13
	Pts: Ndoye 16; Rebs: Ndoye 15; Asts: Xie Ming-Jun 4	boxscore	Pts: Holman 19; Rebs: Gilbeck, Holman 10; Asts: Chiang Yu-An, Lin Chun-Chi 6	Arena: Taichung Intercontinental Basketball Stadium; Attendance: 3,000; Referees: Lo Kuo-Hsien, Chen Chien-Lin, Ou Yang Yu-Hsien

April 18, 2026 Regular #114	Taoyuan Taiwan Beer Leopards	93–107	New Taipei CTBC DEA	New Taipei City
17:00 (UTC+8)	Scoring by quarter: 22–32, 36–30, 15–20, 20–25
	Pts: Gao Jin-Wei 26; Rebs: Gao Jin-Wei, Kromah 8 Asts: Kromah 7	boxscore	Pts: Radović, Gaddefors 23; Rebs: Gaddefors 13; Asts: Wei Chia-Hao 5	Arena: Xinzhuang Gymnasium; Attendance: 5,011; Referees: Huang Chen-Feng, Lai Chien-Hao, Chen Ching-Hsiang

April 19, 2026 Regular #115	Hsinchu Toplus Lioneers	86–92	Formosa Dreamers	Taichung City
14:30 (UTC+8)	Scoring by quarter: 30–21, 23–24, 14–22, 19–25
	Pts: Kao Kuo-Hao 21; Rebs: Pember, Marić 8 Asts: Pember 6	boxscore	Pts: Holman 31; Rebs: Bentil 10; Asts: Bentil 10	Arena: Taichung Intercontinental Basketball Stadium; Attendance: 3,000; Referees: Peng Shih-Hsuan, Yang Shih-Hsien, Huang Po-Wei

April 19, 2026 Regular #116	Kaohsiung Aquas	99–115	New Taipei CTBC DEA	New Taipei City
17:00 (UTC+8)	Scoring by quarter: 18–35, 25–21, 27–22, 29–37
	Pts: Maldonado 33; Rebs: Krajina 23; Asts: Maldonado 5	boxscore	Pts: Hsieh Ya-Hsuan 25; Rebs: Beech 10; Asts: Hsieh Ya-Hsuan 6	Arena: Xinzhuang Gymnasium; Attendance: 3,817; Referees: Sung Ming-Lu, Lin Chien-Hung, Wu Fang-Shan

=== Matchweek 26 ===
April 24, 2026 Regular #117	Formosa Dreamers	99–105	New Taipei Kings	New Taipei City
19:00 (UTC+8)	Scoring by quarter: 16–28, 32–29, 32–26, 19–22
	Pts: Gilbeck 31; Rebs: Bentil 14; Asts: Bentil 5	boxscore	Pts: Washburn 26; Rebs: Washburn 12; Asts: J. Lin 9	Arena: Xinzhuang Gymnasium; Attendance: 3,723; Referees: Ho Chang-Jen, Lin Yuan-Dian, Lin Tsung-Yun

April 25, 2026 Regular #118	Kaohsiung Aquas	85–99	Taoyuan Taiwan Beer Leopards	Taoyuan City
14:30 (UTC+8)	Scoring by quarter: 18–23, 27–24, 15–32, 25–20
	Pts: Želionis 33; Rebs: Maldonado 10; Asts: Maldonado 14	boxscore	Pts: Diallo 31; Rebs: Diallo 18; Asts: Gao Jin-Wei 11	Arena: Taoyuan Arena; Attendance: 5,733; Referees: Peng Shih-Hsuan, Yang Shih-Hsien, Ou Yang Yu-Hsien

April 25, 2026 Regular #119	Hsinchu Toplus Lioneers	104–86	Taipei Taishin Mars	Taipei City
17:00 (UTC+8)	Scoring by quarter: 22–15, 31–24, 22–24, 29–23
	Pts: Lu Kuan-Hsuan 27; Rebs: Marić 15; Asts: Tseng Po-Yu 6	boxscore	Pts: Ndoye 22; Rebs: Ndoye 10; Asts: Ting Sheng-Ju 13	Arena: Taipei Heping Basketball Gymnasium; Attendance: 4,653; Referees: Chen Chao-Hung, Sung Ming-Lu, Lo Kuo-Hsien

April 26, 2026 Regular #120	Formosa Dreamers	100–104	Taoyuan Taiwan Beer Leopards	Taoyuan City
14:30 (UTC+8)	Scoring by quarter: 29–23, 18–27, 22–35, 31–19
	Pts: Holman 24; Rebs: Holman 17; Asts: Thompkins 5	boxscore	Pts: Kromah 35; Rebs: Diallo 11; Asts: Gao Jin-Wei 6	Arena: Taoyuan Arena; Attendance: 6,033; Referees: Chuang Chih-Chun, Lin Chien-Hung, Hsieh Shang-Chien

April 26, 2026 Regular #121	New Taipei CTBC DEA	111–103	Taipei Taishin Mars	Taipei City
17:00 (UTC+8)	Scoring by quarter: 29–35, 17–28, 24–17, 41–23
	Pts: Radović 27; Rebs: Gaddefors 14; Asts: Hsieh Ya-Hsuan 8	boxscore	Pts: Ting Sheng-Ju 34; Rebs: Ndoye 16; Asts: Ting Sheng-Ju 11	Arena: Taipei Heping Basketball Gymnasium; Attendance: 4,022; Referees: Hsieh Wen-Wei, Lai Chien-Hao, Yeh Yen-Hsi

=== Matchweek 27 ===
April 29, 2026 Regular #122	New Taipei Kings	78–98	Hsinchu Toplus Lioneers	Hsinchu County
19:00 (UTC+8)	Scoring by quarter: 20–19, 13–31, 28–24, 17–24
	Pts: Lin Yan-Ting 15; Rebs: Olujobi 10; Asts: J. Lin 11	boxscore	Pts: Marić 31; Rebs: Marić 18; Asts: Tseng Po-Yu 7	Arena: Hsinchu County Stadium; Attendance: 3,761; Referees: Chen Chao-Hung, Sung Ming-Lu, Lo Kuo-Hsien

May 2, 2026 Regular #123	Taipei Taishin Mars	73–96	Hsinchu Toplus Lioneers	Hsinchu County
14:30 (UTC+8)	Scoring by quarter: 25–29, 14–24, 17–19, 17–24
	Pts: Ndoye 19; Rebs: Ndoye 16; Asts: Frazier, Wei Peng-Ho 4	boxscore	Pts: Liu Cheng-Hsun 21; Rebs: Pember 10; Asts: Marić, Tsai Cheng-Kang 5	Arena: Hsinchu County Stadium; Attendance: 5,050; Referees: Huang Chen-Feng, Hsieh Shang-Chien, Ou Yang Yu-Hsien

May 2, 2026 Regular #124	Taoyuan Taiwan Beer Leopards	94–97	New Taipei Kings	New Taipei City
17:00 (UTC+8)	Scoring by quarter: 18–19, 33–26, 20–28, 23–24
	Pts: Miller 24; Rebs: McCullough 18; Asts: Tsao Xun-Xiang 5	boxscore	Pts: Harris 33; Rebs: Washburn 18; Asts: Harris 10	Arena: Xinzhuang Gymnasium; Attendance: 5,185; Referees: Lai Chien-Hao, Peng Shih-Hsuan, Wu Fang-Shan

May 3, 2026 Regular #125	Kaohsiung Aquas	99–102	Hsinchu Toplus Lioneers	Hsinchu County
14:30 (UTC+8)	Scoring by quarter: 20–29, 22–26, 26–25, 31–22
	Pts: Su Wen-Ju 22; Rebs: Želionis 15; Asts: Shih Chin-Yao 5	boxscore	Pts: Pember 24; Rebs: Marić 12; Asts: Pember 11	Arena: Hsinchu County Stadium; Attendance: 4,887; Referees: Hsieh Wen-Wei, Lo Kuo-Hsien, Chen Ching-Hsiang

May 3, 2026 Regular #126	New Taipei CTBC DEA	111–87	New Taipei Kings	New Taipei City
17:00 (UTC+8)	Scoring by quarter: 31–23, 24–15, 21–15, 35–34
	Pts: Bachir 23; Rebs: Gaddefors 9 Asts: Lin Wei-Han 8	boxscore	Pts: Olujobi 27; Rebs: Washburn 13; Asts: J. Lin 6	Arena: Xinzhuang Gymnasium; Attendance: 5,513; Referees: Ho Chang-Jen, Chuang Chih-Chun, Lin Chien-Hung

== Awards ==
=== Yearly awards ===
2025–26 TPBL awards
Award		Recipient	Team	Ref.
Most Valuable Player		Gao Jin-Wei	Taoyuan Taiwan Beer Leopards	
Most Valuable Import		Lasan Kromah	Taoyuan Taiwan Beer Leopards	
Defensive Player of the Year		Brandon Gilbeck	Formosa Dreamers	
Rookie of the Year		Liu Cheng-Hsun	Hsinchu Toplus Lioneers	
Sixth Man of the Year		Lin Chun-Chi	Formosa Dreamers	
Most Improved Player		Tseng Po-Yu	Hsinchu Toplus Lioneers	
Most Popular Player of the Year		Gao Jin-Wei	Taoyuan Taiwan Beer Leopards	
Coach of the Year		Henrik Rödl	Taoyuan Taiwan Beer Leopards	
General Manager of the Year		Yen Hsing-Su	Taoyuan Taiwan Beer Leopards	
Home-Court of the Year		Hsinchu Toplus Lioneers		
Cheerleading Team of the Year		Passion Sisters	New Taipei CTBC DEA	
Most Popular Cheerleader of the Year		Yua Mikami	Formosa Sexy	
Most Popular Mascot of the Year		Ready	Hsinchu Toplus Lioneers	
Plays of the Year	Clutch Play of the Year	Kao Kuo-Hao	Hsinchu Toplus Lioneers	
Plays of the Year	Dunk of the Year	Samuel Manu	Taipei Taishin Mars	
Plays of the Year	Assist of the Year	Lu Kuan-Hsuan	Hsinchu Toplus Lioneers	
Plays of the Year	Block of the Year	Gao Jin-Wei	Taoyuan Taiwan Beer Leopards	

- All-TPBL First Team:
  - Gao Jin-Wei (Taoyuan Taiwan Beer Leopards)
  - Kao Kuo-Hao (Hsinchu Toplus Lioneers)
  - Mohammad Al Bachir Gadiaga (New Taipei CTBC DEA)
  - Lasan Kromah (Taoyuan Taiwan Beer Leopards)
  - Marko Todorović (New Taipei CTBC DEA)
- All-TPBL Second Team:
  - Ting Sheng-Ju (Taipei Taishin Mars)
  - Chiang Yu-An (Formosa Dreamers)
  - Su Wen-Ju (Kaohsiung Aquas)
  - Drew Pember (Hsinchu Toplus Lioneers)
  - Aric Holman (Formosa Dreamers)

- All-Defensive First Team:
  - Kao Kuo-Hao (Hsinchu Toplus Lioneers)
  - Lee Kai-Yan (New Taipei Kings)
  - Mohammad Al Bachir Gadiaga (New Taipei CTBC DEA)
  - Lasan Kromah (Taoyuan Taiwan Beer Leopards)
  - Brandon Gilbeck (Formosa Dreamers)
- All-Defensive Second Team:
  - Su Wen-Ju (Kaohsiung Aquas)
  - Hsieh Ya-Hsuan (New Taipei CTBC DEA)
  - Samuel Manu (Taipei Taishin Mars)
  - Malcolm Miller (Taoyuan Taiwan Beer Leopards)
  - Marko Todorović (New Taipei CTBC DEA)

=== Statistical awards ===
2025–26 TPBL statistical awards
Award	Recipient	Team	Statistic	Ref.
Points Leader	Lasan Kromah	Taoyuan Taiwan Beer Leopards	24.2	
Rebounds Leader	Marko Todorović	New Taipei CTBC DEA	13.1	
Assists Leader	Ting Sheng-Ju	Taipei Taishin Mars	7.7	
Steals Leader	Lasan Kromah	Taoyuan Taiwan Beer Leopards	2.8	
Blocks Leader	Brandon Gilbeck	Formosa Dreamers	2.0	

=== Player of the Week ===
Week	Recipient	Team	Ref.
1	Jayden Gardner	New Taipei Kings	
2	Lasan Kromah	Taoyuan Taiwan Beer Leopards	
3	Drew Pember	Hsinchu Toplus Lioneers	
4	Nemanja Radović	New Taipei CTBC DEA	
5	Lasan Kromah	Taoyuan Taiwan Beer Leopards	
6	Drew Pember	Hsinchu Toplus Lioneers	
7	Bogdan Bliznyuk	Kaohsiung Aquas	
8	Darral Willis	Taipei Taishin Mars	
9	Marko Todorović	New Taipei CTBC DEA	
10	Jason Washburn	New Taipei Kings	
11	Drew Pember	Hsinchu Toplus Lioneers	
12	Cheick Diallo	Taoyuan Taiwan Beer Leopards	
13	Bogdan Bliznyuk	Kaohsiung Aquas	
14	Kao Kuo-Hao	Hsinchu Toplus Lioneers	
15	Makur Maker	Taipei Taishin Mars	
16	Joseph Lin	New Taipei Kings	
17	Ben Bentil	Formosa Dreamers	
18	Gao Jin-Wei	Taoyuan Taiwan Beer Leopards	
19	Jalen Harris	New Taipei Kings	
20	Drew Pember	Hsinchu Toplus Lioneers	
21	Ben Bentil	Formosa Dreamers	
22	Drew Pember	Hsinchu Toplus Lioneers	
23	Lasan Kromah	Taoyuan Taiwan Beer Leopards	
24	Aric Holman	Formosa Dreamers	
25	Nemanja Radović	New Taipei CTBC DEA	
26	Cheick Diallo	Taoyuan Taiwan Beer Leopards	
27	Liu Cheng-Hsun	Hsinchu Toplus Lioneers	

=== Player of the Month ===
Month	Local player		Import player		Ref.
Month	Recipient	Team	Recipient	Team	Ref.
2025
October & November	Gao Jin-Wei	Taoyuan Taiwan Beer Leopards	Lasan Kromah	Taoyuan Taiwan Beer Leopards	
December	Hsieh Ya-Hsuan	New Taipei CTBC DEA	Marko Todorović	New Taipei CTBC DEA	
2026
January & February	Gao Jin-Wei	Taoyuan Taiwan Beer Leopards	Makur Maker	Taipei Taishin Mars	
March	Mohammad Al Bachir Gadiaga	New Taipei CTBC DEA	Ben Bentil	Formosa Dreamers	
April & May	Mohammad Al Bachir Gadiaga	New Taipei CTBC DEA	Aric Holman	Formosa Dreamers	

== See also ==
- 2025–26 Formosa Dreamers season
- 2025–26 Hsinchu Toplus Lioneers season
- 2025–26 Kaohsiung Aquas season
- 2025–26 New Taipei CTBC DEA season
- 2025–26 New Taipei Kings season
- 2025–26 Taipei Taishin Mars season
- 2025–26 Taoyuan Taiwan Beer Leopards season
