= Henrik Rödl =

German basketball player and coach

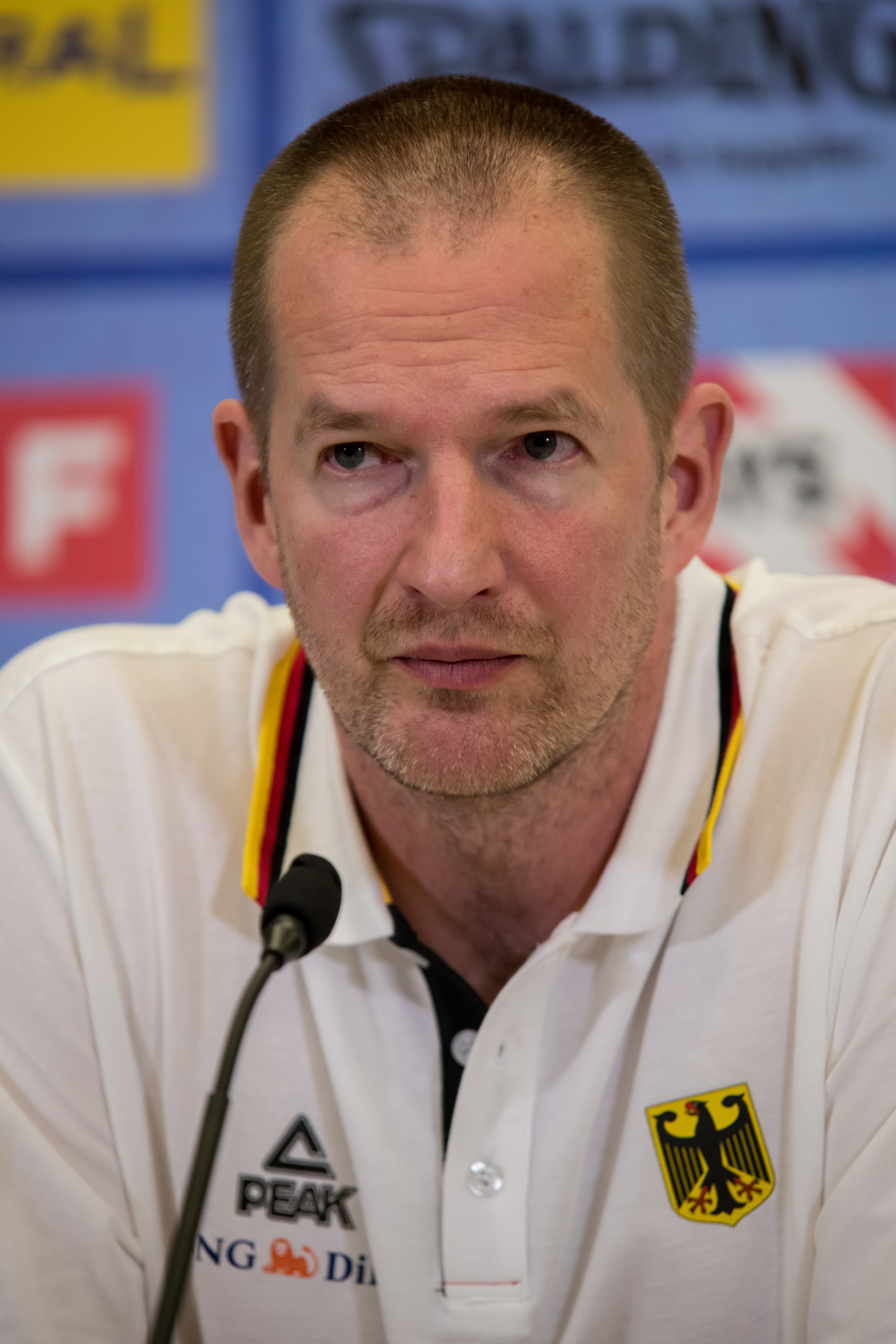
- Rödl as the head coach of Germany, 2017

Taoyuan Taiwan Beer Leopards
- Title: Head coach
- League: Taiwan Professional Basketball League

Personal information
- Born: 4 March 1969 (age 57) Offenbach am Main, West Germany
- Listed height: 2.01 m (6 ft 7 in)

Career information
- High school: Chapel Hill (Chapel Hill, North Carolina)
- College: North Carolina (1989–1993)
- NBA draft: 1993: undrafted
- Playing career: 1993–2004
- Position: Small forward / shooting guard
- Number: 4, 5
- Coaching career: 2005–present

Career history

Playing
- 1993–2004: ALBA Berlin

Coaching
- 2005–2007: ALBA Berlin
- 2010–2015: TBB Trier
- 2017–2021: Germany
- 2021–2022: Türk Telekom
- 2022–2023: Al Ittihad Alexandria
- 2024: Egypt
- 2025–present: Taoyuan Taiwan Beer Leopards

Career highlights
- As player: FIBA EuroStar (1998); FIBA Korać Cup champion (1995); 7× German League champion (1997–2003); German League MVP (1996); 4× German Cup winner (1997, 1999, 2002, 2003); No. 4 retired by Alba Berlin; NCAA champion (1993); North Carolina Mr. Basketball (1987); As head coach: German Cup winner (2006); TPBL Coach of the Year (2026)
Medals
Representing Germany
FIBA World Cup
Bronze medal – third place	2002 Indianapolis	National team
EuroBasket
Gold medal – first place	1993 Germany	National team
Universiade
Silver medal – second place	2015 Gwangju	National team

Henrik Markus Rödl (born 4 March 1969) is a German professional basketball coach and former player, who served as head coach for Taoyuan Taiwan Beer Leopards of the Taiwan Professional Basketball League (TPBL). He played college basketball in the US for coach Dean Smith at the University of North Carolina. Born in Offenbach am Main, Hesse, he has been credited for his role in bringing other European players, including fellow German Ademola Okulaja, into the North Carolina basketball program.

A 2.01 metres (6 ft 7 in) shooting guard/small forward, Rödl had great success and a number of championships over a long career in American collegiate and international professional basketball.

== College career ==
Rödl was spotted by Dean Smith's staff while he was an exchange student at Chapel Hill High School, a school located only a few miles from UNC's campus. Rödl and teammate Major Geer, led the Chapel Hill High boys basketball team to the 1987 NCHSAA 4A state title. He returned to Germany for 2 years, before returning back to Chapel Hill for college.

Rödl played for the North Carolina Tar Heels from 1989 to 1993. Rödl's Tar Heels won the 1993 NCAA Men's Division I Basketball Tournament, making Rödl the third German to win an NCAA title. He wore jersey #5 during his collegiate career. During his time at North Carolina Rödl averaged 3.4 points, 1.3 rebounds and 2.2 assists per game.

== Professional career ==
Rödl played professionally for ALBA Berlin for 11 years. His team won the 1995 Korać Cup, a former European international pro basketball tournament, and began building a German basketball dynasty. Rödl's ALBA Berlin teams won seven consecutive championships in the Bundesliga from 1997 through 2003. His jersey number 4 was retired by ALBA Berlin in 2010.

== National team career ==
Rödl also played for many years for the German national basketball team. Rödl played on the team that competed at the 1992 Summer Olympics and led the German team to the European Basketball Championship in 1993. He also played on the team that won the bronze medal at the 2002 FIBA World Championship. Rödl also played for the German team in the 1995, 1997 and 1999 European championship tournaments. He won a total of 178 caps for the German men's national team.

== Coaching career ==
Rödl started his coaching career in the youth ranks of ALBA Berlin, before being named ALBA head coach in January 2005. He was released in June 2007, but stayed on with the club serving as director of the youth program and coach of the development squad. In 2010, he became head coach of TBB Trier. He left his job there 2015.

Already in May 2014, Rödl had been named head coach of the German A2 men's national team. In 2015, he coached the team to a silver medal at the World University Games. In January 2016, Rödl signed a deal as full-time coach of the German Basketball Federation, continuing as head coach of the A2 squad and serving as assistant to Chris Fleming with the men's national team. Rödl took over the head coaching job on 18 September 2017.

On 14 December 2021, he has signed with Türk Telekom of the Basketball Super League.

In October 2022, Rödl signed as the head coach of Al Ittihad Alexandria in Egypt, a position he held until June 2023. In January 2024, he became the head coach of Egypt national team, with his contract extended until the conclusion of the 2024 FIBA Olympic qualifications, where Egypt failed to qualify to the major tournament as they finished last in their group.

On July 21, 2025, Rödl was hired as the head coach of the Taoyuan Taiwan Beer Leopards of the Taiwan Professional Basketball League (TPBL).

On May 11, 2026, Rödl was re-signed as the head coach of the Taoyuan Taiwan Beer Leopards of the Taiwan Professional Basketball League (TPBL) for multi-year contract. On May 13, Rödl awarded the Coach of the Year of the TPBL in 2025–26 season.
