= 2025 TPBL draft =

2nd edition of the TPBL draft

General information
- Sport: Basketball
- Date: August 11, 2025
- Location: Grand Hilai Taipei (Taipei City)
- Network: TPBL on Youtube

Overview
- 8 total selections in 2 rounds
- League: Taiwan Professional Basketball League
- First selection: Liu Cheng-Hsun (Hsinchu Toplus Lioneers)

The 2025 TPBL draft was the second edition of the Taiwan Professional Basketball League's annual draft. It was held on August 11, 2025, at Grand Hilai Taipei in Taipei City. There were seven teams joined the draft, including the Formosa Dreamers, Hsinchu Toplus Lioneers, Kaohsiung Aquas, New Taipei CTBC DEA, New Taipei Kings, Taipei Taishin Mars, and the Taoyuan Taiwan Beer Leopards. There were 27 players participated in the draft, and 8 players were chosen in 2 rounds.

== Draft results ==
G	Guard	F	Forward	C	Center

^{~}	Denotes player who has been selected as Rookie of the Year

Rnd.	Pick	Player	Pos.	Team	School / club team
1	1	Liu Cheng-Hsun^{~}	F	Hsinchu Toplus Lioneers	UCH (Sr.)
1	2	Tseng Hsin-Wu	F	New Taipei CTBC DEA	NTNU (Sr.)
1	3	Hsu Hong-Wei	G	Taoyuan Taiwan Beer Leopards	UCH (Sr.)
1	4	Xie Ming-Jun	F	Taipei Taishin Mars	Southern Coast Academy
1	5	Mayaw Fotol	F	Kaohsiung Aquas	NTSU (Sr.)
1	6	Jonathan Smith	G/F	New Taipei Kings	NTUA (Sr.)
2	7	Wei Peng-Ho	G	Taipei Taishin Mars	NTNU (Sr.)
2	8	Ryder Hsiung	F	New Taipei Kings	Willamette (Sr.)

- Reference：

== Undrafted players ==
These players were not selected in the 2025 TPBL draft, but have played at least one game in the TPBL.

Player	Pos.	Join team	School / club team
Karl Breuer	F/C	Hsinchu Toplus Lioneers	NTUA (So.)
Chung Li-Hsiang	F	New Taipei Kings	NCCU (Sr.)
Wang Cheng-Lin	C	Taipei Taishin Mars	LIT (Jr.)

== Draft combine ==
On July 26, the news reported that the TPBL cancelled the draft combine.

== Entrants ==
On August 7, the TPBL released its official list of entrants, consisting of 27 players from college and other educational institutions in this edition of the draft.

- (Taiwan) (Germany) Karl Breuer – F/C, NTUA
- (United States) (Taiwan) Caleb Chiang – G, Bellevue
- (Taiwan) Chiang Chi-An – G, UT
- (Taiwan) Chung Chun-Wei – F, HWU
- (Taiwan) Chung Li-Hsiang – F, NCCU
- (Taiwan) Mayaw Fotol – F, NTSU
- (Taiwan) Hsieh Shu-Yi – G, NTSU
- (United States) (Taiwan) Ryder Hsiung – F, Willamette
- (Taiwan) Hsu Hong-Wei – G, UCH
- (Taiwan) Hsu Ting-Wei – G, NTSU
- (Taiwan) Huang Chun-Yen – G, NTUA
- (Taiwan) Huang Wei-Cheng – F, NTSU
- (Taiwan) Hung Yu-Hsiang – F, NUTN
- (Taiwan) Lai En-Yuan – G/F, NFU
- (Taiwan) Lee Cheng-Chien – G, CYCU
- (Taiwan) Lee Yu-Chi – G, ISU
- (Taiwan) Liang Wen-Chieh – F, UT
- (Taiwan) Lin Hsin-Wei – G, Westcliff
- (Taiwan) Lin Yu-Chien – G/F, Blue Mountain Christian
- (Taiwan) Liu Cheng-Hsun – F, UCH
- (Taiwan) Jonathan Smith – G/F, NTUA
- (Taiwan) Tseng Chi-Hsiang – G, UT
- (Taiwan) Tseng Hsin-Wu – F, NTNU
- (Taiwan) Wang Cheng-Lin – C, LIT
- (Taiwan) Wang Chun-Sheng – G, NFU
- (Taiwan) (Vietnam) Wei Peng-Ho – G, NTNU
- (Taiwan) Xie Ming-Jun – F, Southern Coast Academy
