= Cheick Diallo =

Malian basketball player (born 1996)

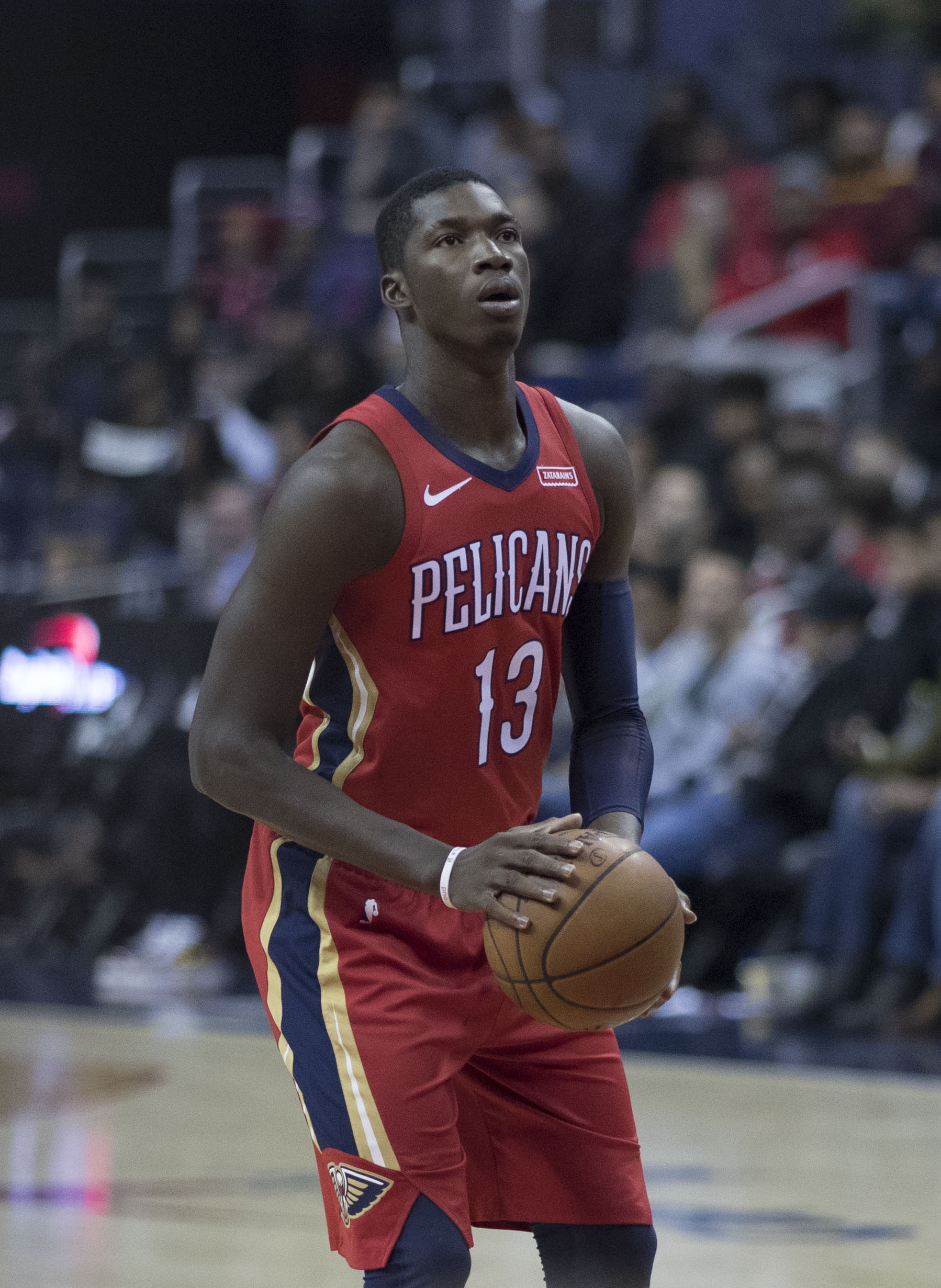
- Diallo with the New Orleans Pelicans in 2017

No. 33 – Hsinchu Toplus Lioneers
- Position: Center / power forward
- League: Taiwan Professional Basketball League

Personal information
- Born: September 13, 1996 (age 30) Kayes, Mali
- Listed height: 203 cm (6 ft 8 in)
- Listed weight: 99 kg (218 lb)

Career information
- High school: Our Savior New American School (Centereach, New York)
- College: Kansas (2015–2016)
- NBA draft: 2016: 2nd round, 33rd overall pick
- Drafted by: Los Angeles Clippers
- Playing career: 2016–present

Career history
- 2016–2019: New Orleans Pelicans
- 2016: →Austin Spurs
- 2017: →Long Island Nets
- 2017: →Greensboro Swarm
- 2019–2020: Phoenix Suns
- 2021: Avtodor Saratov
- 2021: Fuenlabrada
- 2021: Motor City Cruise
- 2021–2022: Detroit Pistons
- 2022: Motor City Cruise
- 2022: Cangrejeros de Santurce
- 2022–2023: Kyoto Hannaryz
- 2023: Cangrejeros de Santurce
- 2023: Sioux Falls Skyforce
- 2023–2024: Kyoto Hannaryz
- 2024: Osos de Manatí
- 2024–2025: Converge FiberXers
- 2025: Osos de Manatí
- 2025–2026: Taoyuan Taiwan Beer Leopards
- 2026: Osos de Manatí
- 2026–present: Hsinchu Toplus Lioneers

Career highlights
- First-team Parade All-American (2015); McDonald's All-American Game MVP (2015)
- Stats at NBA.com
- Stats at Basketball Reference

Cheick Tidiane Diallo (SHEK DEE-ah-low; born September 13, 1996) is a Malian professional basketball player for the Hsinchu Toplus Lioneers of the Taiwan Professional Basketball League (TPBL). Diallo was a five-star recruit and the MVP (Most Valuable Player) of the 2015 McDonald's All-American Boys Game. He played one season of college basketball for the Kansas Jayhawks before declaring for the 2016 NBA draft, where he was selected with the 33rd overall pick by the Los Angeles Clippers.

== Early life ==
Diallo was born and raised in Kayes, Mali. It took approximately 15 hours to drive from his hometown to Bamako, the country's capital city. He was the youngest in his family and had five brothers. He often played basketball with his older friends and family which brought out his skills. Diallo moved to the United States in February 2012 in pursuit of a basketball career. He was not fluent in the English language at the time. He recalled the time, "It was so tough. I left my parents, my friends, my brothers, everything, just to come here." Diallo began playing basketball in 2010.

== High school career ==
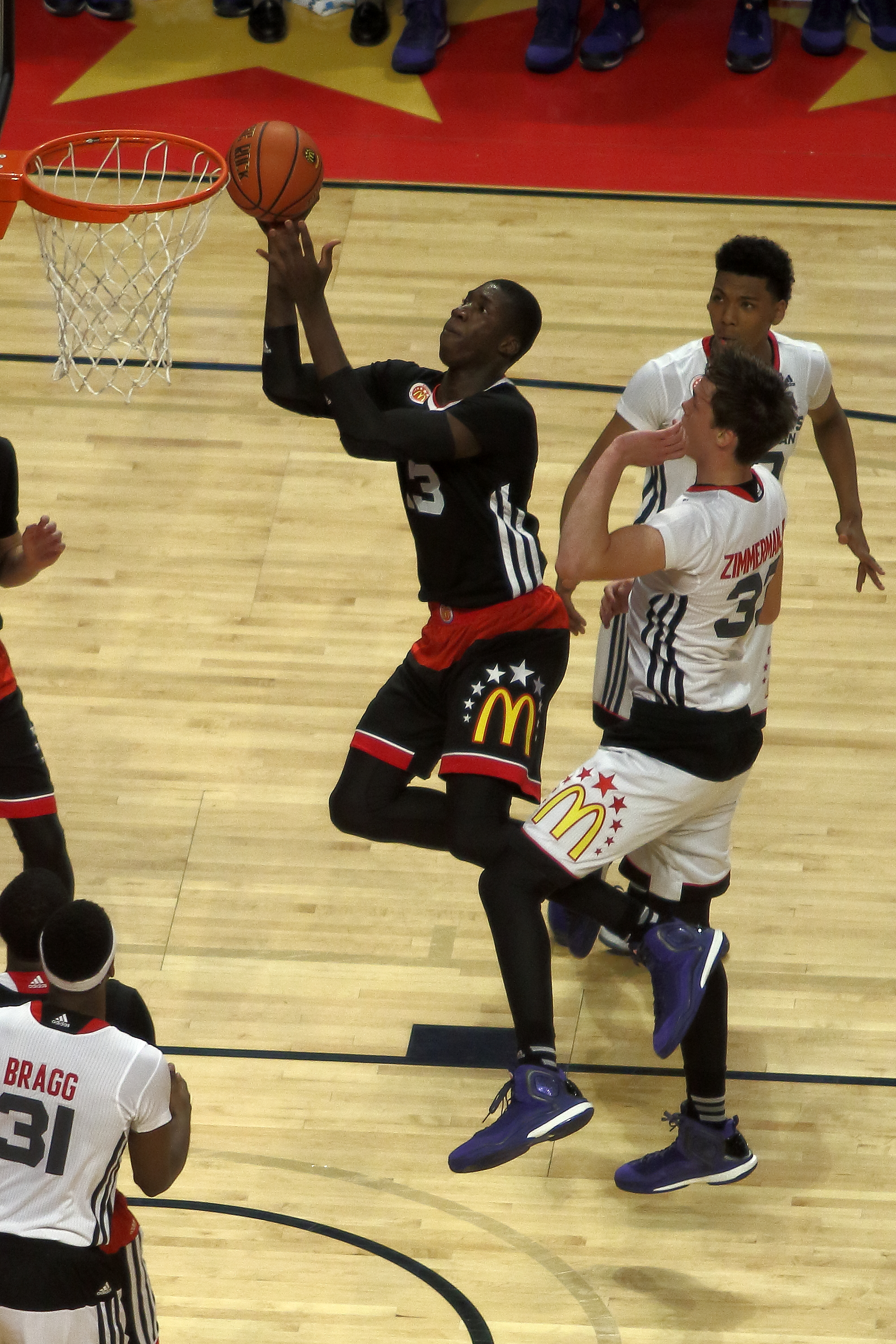
Diallo in the 2015 McDonald's All-American Game

Through its international program, Diallo began attending Our Savior New American School in Centereach, New York. He played with Chris Obekpa in his freshman season and, at first, was dominated by the fellow African big man. Diallo said, "I didn't know what I was doing. I couldn't make a point. [Obekpa] blocked me every time." In later seasons, he became more effective for his team and attracted attention through his shot-blocking, rebounding, and versatility. Diallo was invited to the NBPA Top 100 camp in 2013 and went on to become its first MVP from Africa. As a junior in 2014, he averaged 18.5 points, 11.2 rebounds, and 4.0 blocks per game while leading his team to a 28–3 record and a division championship. As a senior, Diallo averaged 17.5 points, 10.5 rebounds, and 2.5 blocks per game. Diallo was named MVP of the 2015 McDonald's All-American Boys Game after scoring 18 points and 10 rebounds leading the East team to a 111–91 win over the West. Diallo was also named MVP of the 2015 Jordan Brand Classic, tallied 26 points and 11 rebounds. Diallo was rated as a five-star recruit and ranked as the No. 7 overall recruit and No. 3 power forward in the 2015 high school class. On April 28, 2015, Diallo committed to Kansas.

== College career ==
Diallo missed the first five games of his freshman season with Kansas after the NCAA failed to clear him to play due to eligibility concerns. On November 25, 2015, he was cleared to play for the Jayhawks in their game against Loyola on December 1, after the NCAA ultimately ruled Diallo had received a limited amount of impermissible benefits. In his lone season at Kansas, Diallo averaged 3.0 points and 2.5 rebounds in 7.5 minutes per game.

In April 2016, Diallo declared for the NBA draft, forgoing his final three years of college eligibility. In May 2016, at the NBA Draft Combine, Diallo registered a 7-foot-4½-inch wingspan and an 8-foot-11½-inch standing reach.

== Professional career ==
=== New Orleans Pelicans (2016–2019) ===
On June 23, 2016, Diallo was selected by the Los Angeles Clippers with the 33rd overall pick in 2016 NBA draft. Diallo was traded to the New Orleans Pelicans later that night. On July 22, 2016, he signed with the Pelicans after averaging 10.2 points, 9.4 rebounds and 2.2 blocks in five Summer League games. He made his NBA debut on October 29, 2016, recording one rebound and one block in six minutes off the bench in the Pelicans' 98–79 loss to the San Antonio Spurs. Diallo played in just two games for a total of seven minutes over the Pelicans' first 23 games of the season. Diallo was the first Pelicans player to wear #13 after its reactivation by the team, the number having previously been retired for Bobby Phills.

On December 10, 2016, he played in just under 31 minutes off the bench and scored 19 points in the Pelicans' 133–105 loss to the Los Angeles Clippers. He also recorded 10 rebounds and shot 8-of-15 from the field. On April 11, 2017, he scored 19 points in a 108–96 loss to the Los Angeles Lakers. The following day, in the Pelicans' season finale, Diallo had 12 points and 16 rebounds in a 103–100 win over the Portland Trail Blazers. During his rookie season, he had multiple assignments with the Austin Spurs, Long Island Nets and Greensboro Swarm of the NBA Development League, pursuant to the flexible assignment rule.

On March 9, 2018, Diallo scored a season-high 14 points in a 116–97 loss to the Washington Wizards. On March 18, 2018, he set a new season high with 17 points in a 108–89 win over the Boston Celtics.

On February 6, 2019, Diallo scored a season-high 18 points in a 125–120 win over the Chicago Bulls. On February 22, he had 16 points and a career-high 18 rebounds in a 126–111 loss to the Indiana Pacers. Diallo matched his season high of 18 points with perfect shooting in a 128–115 win over the Los Angeles Lakers on February 23.

=== Phoenix Suns (2019–2020) ===
On July 23, 2019, the Phoenix Suns signed Diallo to a two-year contract. On November 24, Diallo scored a career-high 22 points in a 114–102 loss to the Denver Nuggets.

=== Avtodor Saratov (2021) ===
On February 2, 2021, Diallo signed with Avtodor Saratov of the VTB United League.

=== Fuenlabrada (2021) ===
On April 14, 2021, Diallo signed with Fuenlabrada of the Spanish Liga ACB.

=== Motor City Cruise / Detroit Pistons (2021–2022) ===
On November 8, 2021, Diallo signed with the Motor City Cruise of the NBA G League. In 13 games, he averaged 14.4 points on 71.4% shooting and 8.5 rebounds in 21.7 minutes per game.

On December 23, 2021, Diallo signed a 10-day contract with the Detroit Pistons via the hardship exemption and after his expired, he was re-acquired by Motor City.

=== Cangrejeros de Santurce (2022) ===
On May 1, 2022, Diallo signed with the Cangrejeros de Santurce of the BSN.

=== Kyoto Hannaryz (2022–2023) ===
On July 26, 2022, Diallo signed with Kyoto Hannaryz of the Japanese B.League.

=== Return to Cangrejeros de Santurce (2023) ===
On May 26, 2023, Diallo re-signed with the Cangrejeros de Santurce of the BSN.

=== Sioux Falls Skyforce (2023) ===
On September 27, 2023, Diallo signed with the Miami Heat, but was waived on October 21, prior to the start of the 2023–24 season. On October 30, he joined the Sioux Falls Skyforce, but left the team on November 16.

=== Return to Kyoto (2023–2024) ===
On November 30, 2023, Diallo returned to Kyoto Hannaryz.

=== Osos de Manatí (2024) ===
On May 25, 2024, Diallo signed with the Osos de Manatí of the Baloncesto Superior Nacional. He had a great season individually, often leading the team in scoring, and the Osos reached the BSN finals for the first time in their history. They would lose 3–4, however, against the Criollos de Caguas.

=== Converge FiberXers (2024–2025) ===
On October 30, 2024, Diallo signed with the Converge FiberXers of the Philippine Basketball Association (PBA) as the team's import for the 2024–25 PBA Commissioner's Cup.

=== Taoyuan Taiwan Beer Leopards (2025–2026) ===
On August 12, 2025, Diallo signed with the Taoyuan Taiwan Beer Leopards of the Taiwan Professional Basketball League (TPBL).

=== Osos de Manatí (2026) ===
On May 28, 2026, Diallo signed with the Osos de Manatí of the Baloncesto Superior Nacional (BSN).

=== Hsinchu Toplus Lioneers (2026–present) ===
On August 5, 2026, Diallo signed with the Hsinchu Toplus Lioneers of the Taiwan Professional Basketball League (TPBL).

== Career statistics ==
Legend
GP	Games played	GS	Games started	MPG	Minutes per game
FG%	Field goal percentage	3P%	3-point field goal percentage	FT%	Free throw percentage
RPG	Rebounds per game	APG	Assists per game	SPG	Steals per game
BPG	Blocks per game	PPG	Points per game	**Bold**	Career high

=== NBA ===
==== Regular season ====
Year	Team	GP	GS	MPG	FG%	3P%	FT%	RPG	APG	SPG	BPG	PPG
2016–17	New Orleans	17	0	11.7	.474	–	.714	4.3	.2	.2	.4	5.1
2017–18	New Orleans	52	0	11.2	.580	–	.758	4.1	.4	.2	.4	4.9
2018–19	New Orleans	**64**	1	**14.0**	.620	.250	.746	**5.2**	**.5**	**.5**	**.5**	**6.0**
2019–20	Phoenix	47	**2**	10.2	**.648**	**.333**	**.872**	2.8	**.5**	.2	.3	4.7
2021–22	Detroit	3	0	10.2	.375	–	.833	4.0	.0	.3	.0	3.7
Career		183	3	11.9	.596	.286	.774	4.1	.4	.3	.4	5.2

==== Playoffs ====
Year	Team	GP	GS	MPG	FG%	3P%	FT%	RPG	APG	SPG	BPG	PPG
2018	New Orleans	7	0	6.9	.417	–	–	1.3	.0	.1	.1	1.4
Career		7	0	6.9	.417	–	–	1.3	.0	.1	.1	1.4

=== College ===
Year	Team	GP	GS	MPG	FG%	3P%	FT%	RPG	APG	SPG	BPG	PPG
2015–16	Kansas	27	1	7.5	.569	–	.556	2.5	.0	.3	.9	3.0
