= Nemanja Radović =

Montenegrin basketball player (born 1991)

No. 11 – Ehime Orange Vikings
- Position: Power forward / Small forward
- League: B.League

Personal information
- Born: November 11, 1991 (age 35) Berane, SR Montenegro, SFR Yugoslavia
- Listed height: 2.08 m (6 ft 10 in)
- Listed weight: 113 kg (249 lb)

Career information
- NBA draft: 2013: undrafted
- Playing career: 2008–present

Career history
- 2008–2011: Mornar
- 2011–2012: Budućnost
- 2012–2013: Vršac
- 2013: KAOD
- 2013–2014: Mega Vizura
- 2014–2017: Murcia
- 2017–2018: Obradoiro
- 2018–2020: Zaragoza
- 2020–2025: UCAM Murcia
- 2025–2026: New Taipei CTBC DEA
- 2026–present: Ehime Orange Vikings
Medals
Representing Montenegro
Men's basketball
Games of the Small States of Europe
Silver medal – second place	2017 San Marino	National Team

Nemanja Radović (Cyrillic: Немања Радовић; born November 11, 1991) is a Montenegrin professional basketball player for the Ehime Orange Vikings of the B.League. He can play both small forward and power forward positions.

== Professional career ==
On July 4, 2020, Radović signed with the UCAM Murcia of the Liga ACB.

On August 25, 2025, Radović signed with the New Taipei CTBC DEA of the Taiwan Professional Basketball League (TPBL).

On July 1, 2026, Radović signed with the Ehime Orange Vikings of the B.League.
