= 2026 TPBL playoffs =

Taiwanese basketball tournament

Tournament details
- Dates: May 5 – June 6, 2026
- Season: 2025–26
- Teams: 5

Final positions
- Champions: Formosa Dreamers (1st title)
- Runners-up: New Taipei Kings
- Semifinalists: Taoyuan Taiwan Beer Leopards; Hsinchu Toplus Lioneers

The 2026 TPBL playoffs was the postseason tournament of the Taiwan Professional Basketball League's (TPBL) 2025–26 season. The play-in series started on May 5 and ended on May 6. The semifinals series started on May 9 and ended on May 17. The finals series started on May 24 and ended on June 6. On June 6, the Formosa Dreamers defeated the New Taipei Kings, 4–3, winning the 2025–26 season championship.

== Format ==
Five teams participated in the playoffs. The top three teams, based on winning percentage of regular season, directly qualified for the semifinals. The fourth and fifth seeds played the best-of-three play-in series, which was in a 1-1-1 format. The fourth seed was awarded a one-win advantage. The winner of the play-in series and the top three seeds played the best-of-five semifinals series, which is in a 2-2-1 format. The winners of the semifinals series play the best-of-seven finals series, which was in a 2-2-1-1-1 format.

== Playoff qualifying ==
On April 19, 2026, the Formosa Dreamers became the first team to clinch the semifinals series. On April 26, the Taoyuan Taiwan Beer Leopards clinched the regular season title. On April 29, the Hsinchu Toplus Lioneers became the final team to secure a direct berth in the semifinals bracket, qualifying as the third seed and relegating the New Taipei CTBC DEA and the New Taipei Kings to the play-in series. On May 6, the New Taipei Kings won the play-in series and advanced to the semifinals bracket.

Seed	Team	Record	Clinched		
Seed	Team	Record	Play-in berth	Semifinals berth	Best record in TPBL
1	Taoyuan Taiwan Beer Leopards	23–13	—	April 25	April 26
2	Formosa Dreamers	22–14	—	April 19	—
3	Hsinchu Toplus Lioneers	22–14	—	April 29	—
4	New Taipei CTBC DEA	20–16	April 29	—	—
5	New Taipei Kings	19–17	April 29	May 6	—

== Bracket ==
Play-in
4	New Taipei CTBC DEA	1
5	**New Taipei Kings**	**2**

Semifinals
1	Taoyuan Taiwan Beer Leopards	1
5	**New Taipei Kings**	**3**
2	**Formosa Dreamers**	**3**
3	Hsinchu Toplus Lioneers	1

Finals
5	New Taipei Kings	3
2	**Formosa Dreamers**	**4**

Bold: Series winner
Italic: Team with home-court advantage

== Play-in: (4) New Taipei CTBC DEA vs. (5) New Taipei Kings ==
MOMOTV
Sportcast

May 5, 2026
19:00 (UTC+8)

boxscore

New Taipei CTBC DEA	86–**102**	**New Taipei Kings**
Scoring by quarter: 14–**24**, **31**–23, **25**–24, 16–**31**
Pts: Hsieh Ya-Hsuan 28; Rebs: Todorović 14; Asts: Lin Wei-Han 6		Pts: J. Lin, Harris 23; Rebs: Harris 13; Asts: J. Lin 9
**Series tied, 1–1**

Xinzhuang Gymnasium, New Taipei City
Attendance: 2,323
Referees: Chen Chao-Hung, Huang Chen-Feng, Hsieh Shang-Chien

MOMOTV
Sportcast

May 6, 2026
19:00 (UTC+8)

boxscore

**New Taipei Kings**	**96**–90	New Taipei CTBC DEA
Scoring by quarter: 24–24, 23–**28**, **26**–17, **23**–21
Pts: Harris 22; Rebs: Daye 11; Asts: J. Lin 7		Pts: Gaddefors 17; Rebs: Gaddefors, Radović 10; Asts: Gaddefors 5
**Kings wins series, 2–1**

Taipei Heping Basketball Gymnasium, Taipei City
Attendance: 2,479
Referees: Lin Yuan-Dian, Lo Kuo-Hsien, Peng Shih-Hsuan

Regular-season series
The DEA won 5–1 in the regular-season series

October 18, 2025

boxscore

**New Taipei CTBC DEA**	**105**–89	New Taipei Kings

Xinzhuang Gymnasium, New Taipei City

December 14, 2025

boxscore

New Taipei Kings	111–**114**	**New Taipei CTBC DEA**

Xinzhuang Gymnasium, New Taipei City

December 21, 2025

boxscore

New Taipei CTBC DEA	78–**85**	**New Taipei Kings**

Xinzhuang Gymnasium, New Taipei City

December 31, 2025

boxscore

New Taipei Kings	82–**94**	**New Taipei CTBC DEA**

Xinzhuang Gymnasium, New Taipei City

April 5, 2026

boxscore

New Taipei Kings	78–**98**	**New Taipei CTBC DEA**

Xinzhuang Gymnasium, New Taipei City

May 3, 2026

boxscore

**New Taipei CTBC DEA**	**111**–87	New Taipei Kings

Xinzhuang Gymnasium, New Taipei City

This was the first playoff meeting between these two teams.

== Semifinals ==
=== (1) Taoyuan Taiwan Beer Leopards vs. (5) New Taipei Kings ===
MOMOTV
Sportcast

May 10, 2026
17:00 (UTC+8)

boxscore

**New Taipei Kings**	**113**–105	Taoyuan Taiwan Beer Leopards
Scoring by quarter: **36**–22, 30–**32**, 23–**26**, 24–**25**
Pts: J. Lin 26; Rebs: Daye 8 Asts: J. Lin, Harris 7		Pts: Kromah 29; Rebs: Miller, Kromah 11; Asts: Kromah 12
**Kings leads series, 1–0**

Taoyuan Arena, Taoyuan City
Attendance: 5,508
Referees: Chuang Chih-Chun, Chen Chao-Hung, Peng Shih-Hsuan

VL Sports
Sportcast

May 13, 2026
19:00 (UTC+8)

boxscore

New Taipei Kings	92–**114**	**Taoyuan Taiwan Beer Leopards**
Scoring by quarter: 21–**32**, 24–**27**, 21–**30**, **26**–25
Pts: J. Lin 21; Rebs: Washburn 12; Asts: J. Lin 5		Pts: Miller 29; Rebs: McCullough 8 Asts: Kromah 9
**Series tied, 1–1**

Taoyuan Arena, Taoyuan City
Attendance: 3,520
Referees: Lin Chien-Hung, Lin Yuan-Dian, Peng Shih-Hsuan

MOMOTV
Sportcast

May 15, 2026
19:00 (UTC+8)

boxscore

Taoyuan Taiwan Beer Leopards	102–**104**	**New Taipei Kings**
Scoring by quarter: **22**–19, 23–**32**, **32**–29, **25**–24
Pts: Kromah 26; Rebs: McCullough 8 Asts: Kromah 12		Pts: Harris 31; Rebs: Washburn 14; Asts: J. Lin 8
**Kings leads series, 2–1**

Taipei Heping Basketball Gymnasium, Taipei City
Attendance: 5,591
Referees: Lo Kuo-Hsien, Lai Chien-Hao, Wu Fang-Shan

MOMOTV
Sportcast

May 17, 2026
17:00 (UTC+8)

boxscore

Taoyuan Taiwan Beer Leopards	114–**116**	**New Taipei Kings**
Scoring by quarter: **31**–27, 29–**36**, 21–**28**, **33**–25
Pts: Gao Jin-Wei 32; Rebs: Miller 7 Asts: Kromah 8		Pts: Harris 30; Rebs: Harris 11; Asts: Harris 7
**Kings wins series, 3–1**

Taipei Heping Basketball Gymnasium, Taipei City
Attendance: 5,838
Referees: Chen Chao-Hung, Lin Chien-Hung, Hsieh Shang-Chien

Regular-season series
Tied 3–3 in the regular-season series

November 22, 2025

boxscore

New Taipei Kings	101–**103**	**Taoyuan Taiwan Beer Leopards**

Taoyuan Arena, Taoyuan City

December 20, 2025

boxscore

Taoyuan Taiwan Beer Leopards	103–**125**	**New Taipei Kings**

Xinzhuang Gymnasium, New Taipei City

January 9, 2026

boxscore

New Taipei Kings	87–**110**	**Taoyuan Taiwan Beer Leopards**

Taoyuan City Zhongli Civil Sports Center, Taoyuan City

March 4, 2026

boxscore

**Taoyuan Taiwan Beer Leopards**	**116**–100	New Taipei Kings

Xinzhuang Gymnasium, New Taipei City

March 8, 2026

boxscore

**New Taipei Kings**	**114**–101	Taoyuan Taiwan Beer Leopards

Taoyuan City Zhongli Civil Sports Center, Taoyuan City

May 2, 2026

boxscore

Taoyuan Taiwan Beer Leopards	94–**97**	**New Taipei Kings**

Xinzhuang Gymnasium, New Taipei City

This was the first playoff meeting between these two teams.

=== (2) Formosa Dreamers vs. (3) Hsinchu Toplus Lioneers ===
MOMOTV
Sportcast

May 9, 2026
17:00 (UTC+8)

boxscore

**Hsinchu Toplus Lioneers**	**97**–94	Formosa Dreamers
Scoring by quarter: 12–**25**, **33**–19, **31**–26, 21–**24**
Pts: Marić 21; Rebs: Marić 11; Asts: Tseng Po-Yu 7		Pts: Bentil 27; Rebs: Bentil 9 Asts: Chiang Yu-An 5
**Lioneers leads series, 1–0**

Taichung Intercontinental Basketball Stadium, Taichung City
Attendance: 3,000
Referees: Hsieh Wen-Wei, Sung Ming-Lu, Huang Chen-Feng

VL Sports
Sportcast

May 12, 2026
19:00 (UTC+8)

boxscore

Hsinchu Toplus Lioneers	61–**83**	**Formosa Dreamers**
Scoring by quarter: 22–**23**, 14–**23**, 16–**18**, 9–**19**
Pts: Lu Kuan-Hsuan 13; Rebs: Pember 14; Asts: Tseng Po-Yu 6		Pts: Ma Chien-Hao 23; Rebs: Thompkins, Bentil 13; Asts: Chiang Yu-An 5
**Series tied, 1–1**

Taichung Intercontinental Basketball Stadium, Taichung City
Attendance: 3,000
Referees: Ho Chang-Jen, Lin Yuan-Dian, Yeh Chun-Hung

VL Sports
Sportcast

May 14, 2026
19:00 (UTC+8)

boxscore

**Formosa Dreamers**	**114**–106	Hsinchu Toplus Lioneers
Scoring by quarter: 24–**28**, **37**–21, 31–**33**, 22–**24**
Pts: Bentil 33; Rebs: Holman 11; Asts: Bentil 8		Pts: Marić 23; Rebs: Marić 11; Asts: Pember, Marić 5
**Dreamers leads series, 2–1**

Hsinchu County Stadium, Hsinchu County
Attendance: 5,127
Referees: Huang Chen-Feng, Yeh Chun-Hung, Ou Yang Yu-Hsien

MOMOTV
Sportcast

May 16, 2026
17:00 (UTC+8)

boxscore

**Formosa Dreamers**	**104**–93	Hsinchu Toplus Lioneers
Scoring by quarter: 28–28, **19**–11, **31**–16, 26–**38**
Pts: Chiang Yu-An 25; Rebs: Bentil 13; Asts: Chiang Yu-An 5		Pts: Marić 24; Rebs: Marić 10; Asts: Lu Kuan-Hsuan 6
**Dreamers wins series, 3–1**

Hsinchu County Stadium, Hsinchu County
Attendance: 6,055
Referees: Hsieh Wen-Wei, Sung Ming-Lu, Lin Yuan-Dian

Regular-season series
The Dreamers won 4–2 in the regular-season series

November 5, 2025

boxscore

Hsinchu Toplus Lioneers	81–**82**	**Formosa Dreamers**

Taichung Intercontinental Basketball Stadium, Taichung City

November 22, 2025

boxscore

Hsinchu Toplus Lioneers	98–**113**	**Formosa Dreamers**

Taichung Intercontinental Basketball Stadium, Taichung City

December 20, 2025

boxscore

Formosa Dreamers	85–**90**	**Hsinchu Toplus Lioneers**

Hsinchu County Stadium, Hsinchu County

January 24, 2026

boxscore

Formosa Dreamers	91–**95**	**Hsinchu Toplus Lioneers**

Hsinchu County Stadium, Hsinchu County

April 12, 2026

boxscore

**Formosa Dreamers**	**94**–85	Hsinchu Toplus Lioneers

Hsinchu County Stadium, Hsinchu County

April 19, 2026

boxscore

Hsinchu Toplus Lioneers	86–**92**	**Formosa Dreamers**

Taichung Intercontinental Basketball Stadium, Taichung City

This was the first playoff meeting between these two teams.

== TPBL Finals: (2) Formosa Dreamers vs. (5) New Taipei Kings ==
VL Sports
Sportcast

May 24, 2026
17:00 (UTC+8)

boxscore

**New Taipei Kings**	**91**–90	Formosa Dreamers
Scoring by quarter: 23–23, 12–**21**, **28**–25, **28**–21
Pts: Harris 41; Rebs: Washburn 14; Asts: J. Lin 5		Pts: Holman 24; Rebs: Bentil 17; Asts: Bentil 5
**Kings leads series, 1–0**

Taichung Intercontinental Basketball Stadium, Taichung City
Attendance: 3,000
Referees: Lin Yuan-Dian, Huang Chen-Feng, Lo Kuo-Hsien

VL Sports
Sportcast

May 26, 2026
19:00 (UTC+8)

boxscore

New Taipei Kings	90–**99**	**Formosa Dreamers**
Scoring by quarter: 20–**28**, 19–**22**, 23–**26**, **28**–23
Pts: Washburn 16; Rebs: Washburn, Daye 9 Asts: Harris 7		Pts: Holman 22; Rebs: Bentil 12; Asts: Bentil 9
**Series tied, 1–1**

Taichung Intercontinental Basketball Stadium, Taichung City
Attendance: 3,000
Referees: Hsieh Wen-Wei, Lai Chien-Hao, Hsieh Shang-Chien

MOMOTV
Sportcast

May 29, 2026
19:00 (UTC+8)

boxscore

Formosa Dreamers	84–**109**	**New Taipei Kings**
Scoring by quarter: 24–**27**, 25–**28**, 13–**22**, 22–**32**
Pts: Thompkins 19; Rebs: Thompkins 10; Asts: Chiang Yu-An, Bentil 4		Pts: Harris 25; Rebs: Washburn, Daye 8 Asts: J. Lin 7
**Kings leads series, 2–1**

Xinzhuang Gymnasium, New Taipei City
Attendance: 6,187
Referees: Sung Ming-Lu, Lin Chien-Hung, Lin Yuan-Dian

MOMOTV
Sportcast

May 31, 2026
17:00 (UTC+8)

boxscore

Formosa Dreamers	93–**96**	**New Taipei Kings**
Scoring by quarter: 21–**25**, 26–**29**, 19–19, **27**–23
Pts: Holman 23; Rebs: Gilbeck 13; Asts: Bentil 8		Pts: Harris, Daye 19; Rebs: Washburn 13; Asts: J. Lin 7
**Kings leads series, 3–1**

Xinzhuang Gymnasium, New Taipei City
Attendance: 6,800
Referees: Huang Chen-Feng, Sung Ming-Lu, Lo Kuo-Hsien

MOMOTV
Sportcast

June 2, 2026
19:00 (UTC+8)

boxscore

New Taipei Kings	69–**105**	**Formosa Dreamers**
Scoring by quarter: 19–**23**, 20–**26**, 17–**35**, 13–**21**
Pts: Washburn 24; Rebs: Olujobi 7 Asts: J. Lin 4		Pts: Thompkins 20; Rebs: Gilbeck 9 Asts: Bentil 5
**Kings leads series, 3–2**

Taichung Intercontinental Basketball Stadium, Taichung City
Attendance: 3,000
Referees: Ho Chang-Jen, Lin Chien-Hung, Lin Yuan-Dian

VL Sports
Sportcast

June 4, 2026
19:00 (UTC+8)

boxscore

**Formosa Dreamers**	**91**–88	New Taipei Kings
Scoring by quarter: 19–19, **25**–20, **25**–19, 22–**30**
Pts: Thompkins 24; Rebs: Gilbeck 14; Asts: Bentil 4		Pts: Harris 28; Rebs: Harris 6 Asts: J. Lin 5
**Series tied, 3–3**

Xinzhuang Gymnasium, New Taipei City
Attendance: 6,648
Referees: Ho Chang-Jen, Hou Chun-Jen, Wang Chang Shih-Yuan

VL Sports
Sportcast

June 6, 2026
17:00 (UTC+8)

boxscore

New Taipei Kings	78–**90**	**Formosa Dreamers**
Scoring by quarter: **21**–18, 17–**28**, **20**–15, 20–**29**
Pts: Daye 16; Rebs: Harris 9 Asts: J. Lin 6		Pts: Bentil 29; Rebs: Bentil 13; Asts: Chiang Yu-An, Lin Chun-Chi 4
**Dreamers wins series, 4–3**

Taichung Intercontinental Basketball Stadium, Taichung City
Attendance: 3,000
Referees: Lin Yuan-Dian, Hou Chun-Jen, Yu Fu-Jung

Regular-season series
The Kings won 4–2 in the regular-season series

October 12, 2025

boxscore

Formosa Dreamers	93–**112**	**New Taipei Kings**

Xinzhuang Gymnasium, New Taipei City

November 12, 2025

boxscore

Formosa Dreamers	91–**94**	**New Taipei Kings**

Xinzhuang Gymnasium, New Taipei City

January 17, 2026

boxscore

New Taipei Kings	96–**116**	**Formosa Dreamers**

Taichung Intercontinental Basketball Stadium, Taichung City

January 31, 2026

boxscore

**New Taipei Kings**	**114**–97	Formosa Dreamers

Taichung Intercontinental Basketball Stadium, Taichung City

March 27, 2026

boxscore

New Taipei Kings	90–**107**	**Formosa Dreamers**

Taichung Intercontinental Basketball Stadium, Taichung City

April 24, 2026

boxscore

Formosa Dreamers	99–**105**	**New Taipei Kings**

Xinzhuang Gymnasium, New Taipei City

This was the first playoff meeting between these two teams.

== Statistical leaders ==
Category	Game high			Average			
Category	Player	Team	High	Player	Team	Avg.	GP
Points	Jalen Harris	New Taipei Kings	41	Lasan Kromah; Chris McCullough	Taoyuan Taiwan Beer Leopards; Taoyuan Taiwan Beer Leopards	24.0	4; 2
Rebounds	Ben Bentil	Formosa Dreamers	17	Nemanja Radović	New Taipei CTBC DEA	11.5	2
Assists	Lasan Kromah	Taoyuan Taiwan Beer Leopards	12	Lasan Kromah	Taoyuan Taiwan Beer Leopards	10.3	4
Steals	Tsai Cheng-Kang; Lasan Kromah; Chiang Yu-An; Lin Yan-Ting; Ben Bentil	Hsinchu Toplus Lioneers; Taoyuan Taiwan Beer Leopards; Formosa Dreamers; New Taipei Kings; Formosa Dreamers	4	Lasan Kromah	Taoyuan Taiwan Beer Leopards	3.5	4
Blocks	Jason Washburn	New Taipei Kings	4	Brandon Gilbeck	Formosa Dreamers	1.9	7
