= 2026 TPBL finals =

Taiwanese basketball championship

Team	Coach	Wins
Formosa Dreamers	Douglas Creighton	4
New Taipei Kings	Hung Chih-Shan	3
- Dates: May 24 – June 6, 2025
- MVP: Ben Bentil (Formosa Dreamers)

The 2026 TPBL finals was the championship series of the Taiwan Professional Basketball League (TPBL)'s 2025–26 season and conclusion of the season's playoffs. The best-of-seven final series was played by the winners of the semifinals series. The finals series started on May 24 and ended on June 6. The series was matched by Formosa Dreamers and New Taipei Kings. On June 6, the Formosa Dreamers defeated the New Taipei Kings, 4–3, winning the 2025–26 season championship. Ben Bentil of the Formosa Dreamers was named the Finals MVP.

== Bracket ==
Play-in
4	New Taipei CTBC DEA	1
5	**New Taipei Kings**	**2**

Semifinals
1	Taoyuan Taiwan Beer Leopards	1
5	**New Taipei Kings**	**3**
2	**Formosa Dreamers**	**3**
3	Hsinchu Toplus Lioneers	1

Finals
5	New Taipei Kings	3
2	**Formosa Dreamers**	**4**

Bold: Series winner
Italic: Team with home-court advantage

== Background ==
=== Road to the finals ===
Formosa Dreamers (2nd seed)		New Taipei Kings (5th seed)
Team / GP / W / L / PCT / GB; Taoyuan Taiwan Beer Leopards / 36 / 23 / 13 / .639 / —; Formosa Dreamers / 36 / 22 / 14 / .611 / 1.0; Hsinchu Toplus Lioneers / 36 / 22 / 14 / .611 / 1.0; New Taipei CTBC DEA / 36 / 20 / 16 / .556 / 3.0; New Taipei Kings / 36 / 19 / 17 / .528 / 4.0; Taipei Taishin Mars / 36 / 11 / 25 / .306 / 12.0; Kaohsiung Aquas / 36 / 9 / 27 / .250 / 14.0	Regular season	Team / GP / W / L / PCT / GB; Taoyuan Taiwan Beer Leopards / 36 / 23 / 13 / .639 / —; Formosa Dreamers / 36 / 22 / 14 / .611 / 1.0; Hsinchu Toplus Lioneers / 36 / 22 / 14 / .611 / 1.0; New Taipei CTBC DEA / 36 / 20 / 16 / .556 / 3.0; New Taipei Kings / 36 / 19 / 17 / .528 / 4.0; Taipei Taishin Mars / 36 / 11 / 25 / .306 / 12.0; Kaohsiung Aquas / 36 / 9 / 27 / .250 / 14.0
No need to play play-in series	Play-in	Defeated the 4th seed New Taipei CTBC DEA, 2–1
Defeated the 3rd seed Hsinchu Toplus Lioneers, 3–1	Semifinals	Defeated the 1st seed Taoyuan Taiwan Beer Leopards, 3–1

=== Regular season series ===
The Kings won 4–2 in the regular-season series.

October 12, 2025

boxscore

Formosa Dreamers	93–**112**	**New Taipei Kings**

Xinzhuang Gymnasium, New Taipei City

November 12, 2025

boxscore

Formosa Dreamers	91–**94**	**New Taipei Kings**

Xinzhuang Gymnasium, New Taipei City

January 17, 2026

boxscore

New Taipei Kings	96–**116**	**Formosa Dreamers**

Taichung Intercontinental Basketball Stadium, Taichung City

January 31, 2026

boxscore

**New Taipei Kings**	**114**–97	Formosa Dreamers

Taichung Intercontinental Basketball Stadium, Taichung City

March 27, 2026

boxscore

New Taipei Kings	90–**107**	**Formosa Dreamers**

Taichung Intercontinental Basketball Stadium, Taichung City

April 24, 2026

boxscore

Formosa Dreamers	99–**105**	**New Taipei Kings**

Xinzhuang Gymnasium, New Taipei City

== Series summary ==
Game	Date	Away Team	Result	Home Team
Game 1	May 24	**New Taipei Kings**	**91**–90 (1–0)	Formosa Dreamers
Game 2	May 26	New Taipei Kings	90–**99** (1–1)	**Formosa Dreamers**
Game 3	May 29	Formosa Dreamers	84–**109** (1–2)	**New Taipei Kings**
Game 4	May 31	Formosa Dreamers	93–**96** (1–3)	**New Taipei Kings**
Game 5	June 2	New Taipei Kings	69–**105** (3–2)	**Formosa Dreamers**
Game 6	June 4	**Formosa Dreamers**	**91**–88 (3–3)	New Taipei Kings
Game 7	June 6	New Taipei Kings	78–**90** (3–4)	**Formosa Dreamers**

== Game summaries ==
=== Game 1 ===
VL Sports
Sportcast

May 24, 2026
17:00 (UTC+8)

boxscore

**New Taipei Kings**	**91**–90	Formosa Dreamers
Scoring by quarter: 23–23, 12–**21**, **28**–25, **28**–21
Pts: Harris 41; Rebs: Washburn 14; Asts: J. Lin 5		Pts: Holman 24; Rebs: Bentil 17; Asts: Bentil 5
**Kings leads series, 1–0**

Taichung Intercontinental Basketball Stadium, Taichung City
Attendance: 3,000
Referees: Lin Yuan-Dian, Huang Chen-Feng, Lo Kuo-Hsien

=== Game 2 ===
VL Sports
Sportcast

May 26, 2026
19:00 (UTC+8)

boxscore

New Taipei Kings	90–**99**	**Formosa Dreamers**
Scoring by quarter: 20–**28**, 19–**22**, 23–**26**, **28**–23
Pts: Washburn 16; Rebs: Washburn, Daye 9 Asts: Harris 7		Pts: Holman 22; Rebs: Bentil 12; Asts: Bentil 9
**Series tied, 1–1**

Taichung Intercontinental Basketball Stadium, Taichung City
Attendance: 3,000
Referees: Hsieh Wen-Wei, Lai Chien-Hao, Hsieh Shang-Chien

=== Game 3 ===
MOMOTV
Sportcast

May 29, 2026
19:00 (UTC+8)

boxscore

Formosa Dreamers	84–**109**	**New Taipei Kings**
Scoring by quarter: 24–**27**, 25–**28**, 13–**22**, 22–**32**
Pts: Thompkins 19; Rebs: Thompkins 10; Asts: Chiang Yu-An, Bentil 4		Pts: Harris 25; Rebs: Washburn, Daye 8 Asts: J. Lin 7
**Kings leads series, 2–1**

Xinzhuang Gymnasium, New Taipei City
Attendance: 6,187
Referees: Sung Ming-Lu, Lin Chien-Hung, Lin Yuan-Dian

=== Game 4 ===
MOMOTV
Sportcast

May 31, 2026
17:00 (UTC+8)

boxscore

Formosa Dreamers	93–**96**	**New Taipei Kings**
Scoring by quarter: 21–**25**, 26–**29**, 19–19, **27**–23
Pts: Holman 23; Rebs: Gilbeck 13; Asts: Bentil 8		Pts: Harris, Daye 19; Rebs: Washburn 13; Asts: J. Lin 7
**Kings leads series, 3–1**

Xinzhuang Gymnasium, New Taipei City
Attendance: 6,800
Referees: Huang Chen-Feng, Sung Ming-Lu, Lo Kuo-Hsien

=== Game 5 ===
MOMOTV
Sportcast

June 2, 2026
19:00 (UTC+8)

boxscore

New Taipei Kings	69–**105**	**Formosa Dreamers**
Scoring by quarter: 19–**23**, 20–**26**, 17–**35**, 13–**21**
Pts: Washburn 24; Rebs: Olujobi 7 Asts: J. Lin 4		Pts: Thompkins 20; Rebs: Gilbeck 9 Asts: Bentil 5
**Kings leads series, 3–2**

Taichung Intercontinental Basketball Stadium, Taichung City
Attendance: 3,000
Referees: Ho Chang-Jen, Lin Chien-Hung, Lin Yuan-Dian

=== Game 6 ===
VL Sports
Sportcast

June 4, 2026
19:00 (UTC+8)

boxscore

**Formosa Dreamers**	**91**–88	New Taipei Kings
Scoring by quarter: 19–19, **25**–20, **25**–19, 22–**30**
Pts: Thompkins 24; Rebs: Gilbeck 14; Asts: Bentil 4		Pts: Harris 28; Rebs: Harris 6 Asts: J. Lin 5
**Series tied, 3–3**

Xinzhuang Gymnasium, New Taipei City
Attendance: 6,648
Referees: Ho Chang-Jen, Hou Chun-Jen, Wang Chang Shih-Yuan

=== Game 7 ===
VL Sports
Sportcast

June 6, 2026
17:00 (UTC+8)

boxscore

New Taipei Kings	78–**90**	**Formosa Dreamers**
Scoring by quarter: **21**–18, 17–**28**, **20**–15, 20–**29**
Pts: Daye 16; Rebs: Harris 9 Asts: J. Lin 6		Pts: Bentil 29; Rebs: Bentil 13; Asts: Chiang Yu-An, Lin Chun-Chi 4
**Dreamers wins TPBL finals, 4–3**

Taichung Intercontinental Basketball Stadium, Taichung City
Attendance: 3,000
Referees: Lin Yuan-Dian, Hou Chun-Jen, Yu Fu-Jung

== Rosters ==
=== Formosa Dreamers ===
2025–26 Formosa Dreamers roster
Players
Coaches

Pos.	No.	Nat.	Name	Ht.	Wt.	Age	From
SG	0	(Taiwan)	Chen Jen-Jei	1.83 m (6 ft 0 in)	80 kg (176 lb)	28 – 16 September 1997	Grand View
SF	2	(Taiwan)	Ma Chien-Hao	2.01 m (6 ft 7 in)	90 kg (198 lb)	25 – 29 April 2001	Georgia State
SG	3	(Taiwan)	Chang Tsung-Hsien **(C)**	1.92 m (6 ft 4 in)	88 kg (194 lb)	37 – 27 December 1988	BYU–Hawaii
PG	9	(Taiwan)	Wu Chia-Chun	1.74 m (5 ft 9 in)	70 kg (154 lb)	32 – 3 March 1994	NTSU
PG	11	(Taiwan)	Lin Chun-Chi	1.75 m (5 ft 9 in)	70 kg (154 lb)	28 – 29 January 1998	UCH
SG	20	(Taiwan)	Chien Wei-Ju	1.86 m (6 ft 1 in)	85 kg (187 lb)	34 – 20 January 1992	NTNU
SF	24	(United States) (Taiwan)	Randall Walko	1.96 m (6 ft 5 in)	93 kg (205 lb)	27 – 21 September 1998	TCNJ
C	26	(Taiwan)	Lee Te-Wei	2.00 m (6 ft 7 in)	105 kg (231 lb)	34 – 15 October 1991	CCUT
SF	27	(Taiwan)	Shih Cheng-Ping	1.90 m (6 ft 3 in)	80 kg (176 lb)	26 – 1 October 1999	ISU
SG	28	(Taiwan)	Lu Kuan-Liang	1.85 m (6 ft 1 in)	90 kg (198 lb)	35 – 9 April 1991	NTUA
PF	33	(United States)	Trey Thompkins **(I)**	2.08 m (6 ft 10 in)	105 kg (231 lb)	36 – 29 May 1990	Georgia
C	34	(United States) (Taiwan)	Brandon Gilbeck **(I)**	2.13 m (7 ft 0 in)	107 kg (236 lb)	29 – 9 December 1996	Western Illinois
PF	35	(United States)	Aric Holman **(I)**	2.08 m (6 ft 10 in)	100 kg (220 lb)	28 – 11 July 1997	Mississippi State
PG	41	(Taiwan)	Chiang Yu-An	1.74 m (5 ft 9 in)	75 kg (165 lb)	34 – 4 August 1991	NTUS
PF	50	(Ghana)	Ben Bentil **(I)**	2.04 m (6 ft 8 in)	107 kg (236 lb)	31 – 29 March 1995	Providence
C	88	(Taiwan)	Chou Po-Chen	1.98 m (6 ft 6 in)	98 kg (216 lb)	35 – 8 August 1990	NTNU

Head coach

- (Taiwan) (United States) Douglas Creighton

Assistant coach(es)

- (Australia) Jamie Pearlman (associate HC)
- (Taiwan) Lai Po-Lin
- (South Korea) (Australia) Daniel Kim

Athletic trainer(s)

- (Taiwan) Hou Yao-Hsin
- (Taiwan) Chen Tzu-Chieh

Team manager

- (Taiwan) Han Chun-Kai

Legend

- **(C)** Team captain
- **(I)** Import player
- Injured

- Roster
Updated: April 18, 2026

=== New Taipei Kings ===
2025–26 New Taipei Kings roster
Players
Coaches

Pos.	No.	Nat.	Name	Ht.	Wt.	Age	From
G	0	(United States) (Jordan)	Jalen Harris **(I)**	1.93 m (6 ft 4 in)	88 kg (194 lb)	27 – 14 August 1998	Nevada
G	1	(United States) (Taiwan)	Joseph Lin	1.82 m (6 ft 0 in)	69 kg (152 lb)	33 – 21 June 1992	Hamilton
G	2	(Taiwan)	Su Pei-Kai	1.87 m (6 ft 2 in)	83 kg (183 lb)	26 – 2 November 1999	NTUA
SF	8	(Taiwan)	Chung Li-Hsiang	1.94 m (6 ft 4 in)	92 kg (203 lb)	23 – 16 March 2003	NCCU
G	9	(Taiwan)	Lee Kai-Yan	1.82 m (6 ft 0 in)	80 kg (176 lb)	33 – 6 May 1993	HWU
G	10	(Taiwan)	Chien You-Che	1.80 m (5 ft 11 in)	80 kg (176 lb)	30 – 10 September 1995	UCH
C	11	(Taiwan)	Wang Po-Chih	1.97 m (6 ft 6 in)	130 kg (287 lb)	29 – 29 October 1996	NTSU
G	12	(Taiwan)	Lin Yan-Ting	1.85 m (6 ft 1 in)	85 kg (187 lb)	25 – 22 October 2000	NCCU
SF	13	(Taiwan)	Lu Cheng-Ju	1.94 m (6 ft 4 in)	88 kg (194 lb)	40 – 13 April 1986	TPEC
F	15	(Jamaica) (United States)	Olufemi Olujobi **(I)**	2.06 m (6 ft 9 in)	112 kg (247 lb)	30 – 5 March 1996	DePaul
PF	17	(Taiwan)	Su Shih-Hsuan	1.97 m (6 ft 6 in)	95 kg (209 lb)	30 – 9 April 1996	NTNU
SF	19	(Taiwan)	Lin Chin-Pang **(C)**	1.90 m (6 ft 3 in)	92 kg (203 lb)	40 – 15 June 1985	MU
SF	20	(United States) (Taiwan)	Ryder Hsiung	1.92 m (6 ft 4 in)	76 kg (168 lb)	23 – 14 April 2003	Willamette
PF	25	(United States)	Austin Daye **(I)**	2.07 m (6 ft 9 in)	91 kg (201 lb)	38 – 5 June 1988	Gonzaga
SF	26	(Taiwan)	Jonathan Smith	1.87 m (6 ft 2 in)	87 kg (192 lb)	23 – 9 May 2003	NTUA
C	42	(United States) (Bulgaria)	Jason Washburn **(I)**	2.13 m (7 ft 0 in)	111 kg (245 lb)	36 – 5 June 1990	Utah

Head coach

- (Taiwan) Hung Chih-Shan (interim)

Assistant coach(es)

- (Australia) (United States) Thomas Wisman
- (Taiwan) Lin Cheng-Yu
- (Taiwan) Wei Wei
- (Taiwan) Lee Wei-En

Strength & conditioning coach(es)

- (Taiwan) Chang Chung-Hsi
- (Taiwan) Chao Te

Athletic trainer(s)

- (Taiwan) Chiu Po-Kai
- (Taiwan) Wu Chung-Hao

Team manager

- (Taiwan) James Mao

Legend

- **(C)** Team captain
- **(I)** Import player
- Injured

- Roster
Updated: May 10, 2026

== Player statistics ==
Legend
GP	Games played	MPG	Minutes per game	FG%	Field goal percentage
3P%	3-point field goal percentage	FT%	Free throw percentage	RPG	Rebounds per game
APG	Assists per game	SPG	Steals per game	BPG	Blocks per game
PPG	Points per game		Finals MVP

=== Formosa Dreamers ===
Player	GP	MPG	PPG	FG%	3P%	FT%	RPG	APG	SPG	BPG
Chen Jen-Jei	2	3:51	1.5	25.0%	33.3%	0.0%	1.0	0.0	0.0	0.0
Ma Chien-Hao	7	21:29	5.4	30.0%	25.0%	72.7%	2.9	1.0	0.4	0.1
Chang Tsung-Hsien	7	28:39	8.1	33.8%	18.2%	81.8%	3.0	1.3	0.3	0.0
Wu Chia-Chun	2	3:31	0.0	0.0%	0.0%	0.0%	0.0	0.5	0.0	0.0
Lin Chun-Chi	7	18:36	9.6	48.9%	26.7%	94.4%	2.6	2.7	0.6	0.0
Chien Wei-Ju	2	1:58	1.5	50.0%	100.0%	0.0%	0.0	0.0	0.0	0.0
Randall Walko	7	30:00	9.6	38.9%	38.5%	93.8%	3.4	1.0	0.4	0.4
Lee Te-Wei	3	2:41	0.3	0.0%	0.0%	50.0%	0.7	0.3	0.0	0.0
Shih Cheng-Ping	Did not play									
Lu Kuan-Liang	7	11:19	1.9	33.3%	20.0%	100.0%	0.6	0.4	0.1	0.0
Trey Thompkins	5	30:31	17.4	47.8%	30.0%	93.3%	9.0	1.6	1.0	0.0
Brandon Gilbeck	5	30:53	12.8	68.6%	50.0%	60.9%	10.6	0.4	0.8	1.8
Aric Holman	4	29:38	20.3	43.3%	35.7%	86.7%	8.0	3.0	1.0	1.0
Chiang Yu-An	7	31:14	9.4	37.3%	24.3%	70.0%	3.4	4.0	1.0	0.3
Ben Bentil	7	32:41	15.0	35.2%	19.2%	80.9%	10.9	5.4	2.3	0.0
Chou Po-Chen	3	3:09	0.0	0.0%	0.0%	0.0%	0.0	0.0	0.0	0.0

=== New Taipei Kings ===
Player	GP	MPG	PPG	FG%	3P%	FT%	RPG	APG	SPG	BPG
Jalen Harris	6	36:44	23.2	44.2%	42.6%	84.4%	5.7	3.5	1.5	0.5
Joseph Lin	7	35:29	12.0	38.5%	28.6%	80.0%	3.1	4.9	1.0	0.3
Su Pei-Kai	3	2:57	0.0	0.0%	0.0%	0.0%	0.3	0.0	0.0	0.0
Chung Li-Hsiang	Did not play									
Lee Kai-Yan	7	22:19	7.7	30.9%	40.0%	63.2%	3.0	1.6	0.7	0.4
Chien You-Che	6	7:55	1.0	42.9%	0.0%	0.0%	1.3	0.2	0.2	0.2
Wang Po-Chih	4	3:31	1.0	50.0%	0.0%	0.0%	1.5	0.3	0.0	0.0
Lin Yan-Ting	7	25:00	7.3	35.3%	25.8%	58.3%	1.7	1.7	1.0	0.1
Lu Cheng-Ju	7	12:05	3.9	42.9%	41.2%	100.0%	1.1	0.4	0.1	0.0
Olufemi Olujobi	1	33:55	10.0	30.0%	33.3%	42.9%	7.0	1.0	1.0	0.0
Su Shih-Hsuan	7	22:34	5.0	37.0%	38.9%	80.0%	3.7	1.4	0.4	0.6
Lin Chin-Pang	5	1:18	0.0	0.0%	0.0%	0.0%	0.4	0.0	0.2	0.0
Ryder Hsiung	7	16:57	4.0	47.4%	43.8%	100.0%	1.4	0.4	0.1	0.3
Austin Daye	7	22:07	10.4	34.7%	24.1%	94.1%	5.6	2.1	0.4	0.0
Jonathan Smith	4	2:43	1.0	50.0%	0.0%	100.0%	0.3	0.0	0.3	0.0
Jason Washburn	7	34:32	15.1	65.2%	100.0%	61.3%	8.9	0.9	0.9	0.6

- Reference：
