= 2025–26 Hsinchu Toplus Lioneers season =

Taiwanese professional basketball season

- President: Chen Mei-Ling
- General Manager: Chang Shu-Jen
- Head Coach: Wesam Al-Sous
- Arena: Hsinchu County Stadium

TPBL results
- Record: 22–14 (61.1%)
- Place: 3rd
- Playoffs finish: Semifinals (lost to Dreamers, 1–3)

Player records
- Points: Drew Pember 18.8
- Rebounds: Drew Pember 11.5
- Assists: Tseng Po-Yu 6.0

The 2025–26 Hsinchu Toplus Lioneers season was the franchise's sixth season, its second season in the Taiwan Professional Basketball League (TPBL).

The Lioneers were coached by Wesam Al-Sous in his second year as head coach.

== Draft ==
Round	Pick	Player	Position(s)	School / club team
1	1	Liu Cheng-Hsun	Forward	UCH

- Reference：

== Roster ==
2025–26 Hsinchu Toplus Lioneers roster
Players
Coaches

Pos.	No.	Nat.	Name	Ht.	Wt.	Age	From
G	1	(United States) (Taiwan)	Jade Tse	1.85 m (6 ft 1 in)	86 kg (190 lb)	26 – 19 March 2000	Queens
F	2	(United States)	Drew Pember (I)	2.10 m (6 ft 11 in)	95 kg (209 lb)	25 – 14 June 2000	UNC Asheville
G	4	(Taiwan)	Kao Kuo-Hao	1.80 m (5 ft 11 in)	76 kg (168 lb)	27 – 22 September 1998	Southeast Missouri State
G	7	(Taiwan)	Tseng Po-Yu	1.84 m (6 ft 0 in)	88 kg (194 lb)	29 – 3 December 1996	MDU
F	8	(Taiwan)	Chu Yun-Hao	1.95 m (6 ft 5 in)	94 kg (207 lb)	28 – 3 November 1997	UCH
G	9	(Taiwan)	Tien Hao	1.74 m (5 ft 9 in)	70 kg (154 lb)	27 – 16 September 1998	NCCU
G	10	(Taiwan)	Liu Cheng-Hsun	1.90 m (6 ft 3 in)	92 kg (203 lb)	23 – 10 April 2003	UCH
F	11	(Taiwan)	Hsiao Shun-Yi (C)	1.93 m (6 ft 4 in)	86 kg (190 lb)	33 – 23 October 1992	NTUA
F	12	(Taiwan)	Lee Chia-Jui	2.00 m (6 ft 7 in)	97 kg (214 lb)	31 – 4 December 1994	KLCIVS
F	17	(Taiwan)	Tsai Cheng-Kang	1.97 m (6 ft 6 in)	95 kg (209 lb)	23 – 8 November 2002	UCH
C	18	(Latvia)	Anžejs Pasečņiks (I)	2.16 m (7 ft 1 in)	103 kg (227 lb)	30 – 20 December 1995	Latvia
F	22	(United States)	TJ Holyfield (I)	2.03 m (6 ft 8 in)	100 kg (220 lb)	30 – 22 September 1995	Texas Tech
F	25	(Taiwan) (Germany)	Karl Breuer	1.90 m (6 ft 3 in)	90 kg (198 lb)	25 – 19 April 2001	NTUA
C	34	(Croatia)	Marin Marić (I)	2.11 m (6 ft 11 in)	113 kg (249 lb)	32 – 21 February 1994	DePaul
G	42	(Taiwan)	Lu Kuan-Hsuan	1.84 m (6 ft 0 in)	88 kg (194 lb)	31 – 2 April 1995	NTNU
SF	75	(Taiwan)	Lee Chi-Wei	1.92 m (6 ft 4 in)	87 kg (192 lb)	33 – 8 April 1993	MDU

Head coach

- (Jordan) (United States) Wesam Al-Sous

Assistant coach(es)

- (United States) Jacob Tyler
- (Taiwan) Chen Tse-Yu
- (Taiwan) Kuo Yen-En

Strength & conditioning coach(es)

- (Taiwan) Chen Hung-Lin
- (Taiwan) Tsai Heng-Yi

Athletic trainer(s)

- (Taiwan) Ou Po-Hung
- (Taiwan) Hsu Teng-Wen

Physician(s)

- (Taiwan) Ou Po-Hung
- (Taiwan) Hsu Teng-Wen

Team manager

- (Taiwan) Chang Shu-Jen

Legend

- (C) Team captain
- (I) Import player
- Injured

- Roster
Updated: May 9, 2026

== International friendship match ==
September 8, 2025
15:30 (UTC+8)

Goyang Sono Skygunners	62–80	Hsinchu Toplus Lioneers

Taipei Nangang Sports Center, Taipei City

== LEVANGA CUP 2025 ==
=== Game log ===
September 13, 2025
14:05 (UTC+9)

Hsinchu Toplus Lioneers	83–100	Levanga Hokkaido

Hokkai Kitayell, Sapporo

September 14, 2025
11:05 (UTC+9)

Wonju DB Promy	86–92	Hsinchu Toplus Lioneers

Hokkai Kitayell, Sapporo

== Preseason ==
=== Game log ===
2025 preseason game log
Total: 1–1 (home: 0–1; road: 1–0)
Preseason : 1–1 (home: 0–1; road: 1–0)

Game	Date	Team	Score	High points	High rebounds	High assists	Location Attendance	Record
1	October 3	@ Aquas	W 98–88	Isaiah Reese (19)	TJ Holyfield (9)	Isaiah Reese (4)	Pingtung County Stadium	1–0
2	October 4	Dreamers	L 88–94	Kao Kuo-Hao (20)	Drew Pember (8)	Isaiah Reese (5)	Pingtung County Stadium	1–1

Color： Win Lose
Schedule

== Regular season ==
=== Standings ===
Pos	Team	Pld	W	L	PCT	GB	Qualification
1	Taoyuan Taiwan Beer Leopards	36	23	13	.639	—	Advance to semifinals
2	Formosa Dreamers	36	22	14	.611	1	Advance to semifinals
3	Hsinchu Toplus Lioneers	36	22	14	.611	1	Advance to semifinals
4	New Taipei CTBC DEA	36	20	16	.556	3	Advance to play-in
5	New Taipei Kings	36	19	17	.528	4	Advance to play-in
6	Taipei Taishin Mars	36	11	25	.306	12	
7	Kaohsiung Aquas	36	9	27	.250	14	

Source: TPBL

=== Game log ===
2025–26 regular season game log
Total: 22–14 (home: 14–4; road: 8–10)
October : 1–0 (home: 0–0; road: 1–0)

Game	Date	Team	Score	High points	High rebounds	High assists	Location Attendance	Record
1	October 26	@ Aquas	W 101–82	Drew Pember (29)	Drew Pember (19)	Tseng Po-Yu (5)	Kaohsiung Arena; 4,531	1–0

November : 3–3 (home: 2–0; road: 1–3)

Game	Date	Team	Score	High points	High rebounds	High assists	Location Attendance	Record
2	November 2	@ DEA	L 91–94	Drew Pember (16)	Drew Pember (12)	Anžejs Pasečņiks (4)	Xinzhuang Gymnasium; 4,108	1–1
3	November 5	@ Dreamers	L 81–82	Drew Pember (24)	Drew Pember (18)	Tseng Po-Yu (7)	Taichung Intercontinental Basketball Stadium; 2,109	1–2
4	November 8	@ Kings	W 108–89	Craig Sword (32)	TJ Holyfield (7)	Kao Kuo-Hao (10)	Xinzhuang Gymnasium; 3,678	2–2
5	November 15	DEA	W 102–85	Drew Pember (27)	Drew Pember (14)	Tseng Po-Yu (8)	Hsinchu County Stadium; 5,532	3–2
6	November 16	Aquas	W 97–89	Drew Pember (18)	Drew Pember (16)	Tseng Po-Yu (8)	Hsinchu County Stadium; 4,821	4–2
7	November 22	@ Dreamers	L 98–113	Kao Kuo-Hao (28); Craig Sword (28)	TJ Holyfield (8)	Drew Pember (3); Liu Cheng-Hsun (3)	Taichung Intercontinental Basketball Stadium; 3,000	4–3

December : 3–4 (home: 2–1; road: 1–3)

Game	Date	Team	Score	High points	High rebounds	High assists	Location Attendance	Record
8	December 3	@ Mars	L 98–100	Drew Pember (34)	Drew Pember (13)	Tseng Po-Yu (7)	Taipei Heping Basketball Gymnasium; 3,158	4–4
9	December 6	@ Leopards	L 94–96	Drew Pember (20)	Drew Pember (18)	Liu Cheng-Hsun (4); Lu Kuan-Hsuan (4)	Taoyuan Arena; 5,827	4–5
10	December 13	@ Aquas	L 89–99	Drew Pember (19)	Drew Pember (17)	Tseng Po-Yu (7)	Kaohsiung Arena; 4,614	4–6
11	December 20	Dreamers	W 90–85	Tseng Po-Yu (17)	Anžejs Pasečņiks (13)	Tseng Po-Yu (8)	Hsinchu County Stadium; 4,817	5–6
12	December 21	Mars	L 83–94	TJ Holyfield (20)	TJ Holyfield (11)	Tseng Po-Yu (6)	Hsinchu County Stadium; 4,508	5–7
13	December 24	Leopards	W 98–82	Drew Pember (32)	Drew Pember (12)	Tseng Po-Yu (9)	Hsinchu County Stadium; 4,158	6–7
14	December 27	@ Kings	W 97–90	Kao Kuo-Hao (18); Anžejs Pasečņiks (18)	Drew Pember (12)	Tseng Po-Yu (6)	Xinzhuang Gymnasium; 3,868	7–7

January : 4–2 (home: 1–1; road: 3–1)

Game	Date	Team	Score	High points	High rebounds	High assists	Location Attendance	Record
15	January 3	@ DEA	W 84–79	Drew Pember (16)	Anžejs Pasečņiks (14)	Tseng Po-Yu (4)	Xinzhuang Gymnasium; 4,872	8–7
16	January 11	@ Aquas	W 95–79	Drew Pember (27)	Drew Pember (13)	Tseng Po-Yu (9)	Kaohsiung Arena; 4,858	9–7
17	January 18	@ Mars	W 101–98	Kao Kuo-Hao (32)	Drew Pember (11); Anžejs Pasečņiks (11)	Tseng Po-Yu (8)	Taipei Heping Basketball Gymnasium; 4,075	10–7
18	January 24	Dreamers	W 95–91	Drew Pember (23)	TJ Holyfield (10)	Tseng Po-Yu (6)	Hsinchu County Stadium; 5,897	11–7
19	January 25	Kings	L 87–94	Drew Pember (21)	Drew Pember (10); Anžejs Pasečņiks (10)	Tseng Po-Yu (7)	Hsinchu County Stadium; 5,559	11–8
20	January 31	@ Leopards	L 88–92	Drew Pember (17)	TJ Holyfield (12)	Tseng Po-Yu (7)	Taoyuan City Zhongli Civil Sports Center; 2,000	11–9

February : 0–1 (home: 0–0; road: 0–1)

Game	Date	Team	Score	High points	High rebounds	High assists	Location Attendance	Record
21	February 15	@ Kings	L 85–100	TJ Holyfield (20)	TJ Holyfield (13)	Kao Kuo-Hao (4); Tseng Po-Yu (4)	Xinzhuang Gymnasium; 4,059	11–10

March : 5–2 (home: 4–1; road: 1–1)

Game	Date	Team	Score	High points	High rebounds	High assists	Location Attendance	Record
22	March 7	@ Leopards	W 114–111	Kao Kuo-Hao (24)	Drew Pember (14)	Tseng Po-Yu (7)	Taoyuan City Zhongli Civil Sports Center; 2,000	12–10
23	March 11	Mars	L 94–102	Drew Pember (28)	Drew Pember (15)	Tseng Po-Yu (10)	Hsinchu County Stadium; 3,411	12–11
24	March 14	Aquas	W 113–97	Drew Pember (28)	Drew Pember (14)	Tseng Po-Yu (10)	Hsinchu County Stadium; 5,217	13–11
25	March 15	Kings	W 113–90	Marin Marić (29)	Marin Marić (16)	Kao Kuo-Hao (9)	Hsinchu County Stadium; 4,807	14–11
26	March 22	@ DEA	L 75–95	Marin Marić (12)	Marin Marić (12)	Kao Kuo-Hao (5)	Xinzhuang Gymnasium; 4,255	14–12
27	March 28	DEA	W 103–99	Drew Pember (20)	Marin Marić (15)	Tseng Po-Yu (5)	Hsinchu County Stadium; 5,291	15–12
28	March 29	Leopards	W 102–91	Kao Kuo-Hao (20)	Drew Pember (19)	Lu Kuan-Hsuan (6)	Hsinchu County Stadium; 5,007	16–12

April : 4–2 (home: 3–1; road: 1–1)

Game	Date	Team	Score	High points	High rebounds	High assists	Location Attendance	Record
29	April 8	DEA	W 117–100	Kao Kuo-Hao (26)	Drew Pember (11)	Kao Kuo-Hao (6); TJ Holyfield (6)	Hsinchu County Stadium; 3,327	17–12
30	April 11	Leopards	W 79–76	TJ Holyfield (14)	Marin Marić (11)	Kao Kuo-Hao (6)	Hsinchu County Stadium; 6,012	18–12
31	April 12	Dreamers	L 85–94	Marin Marić (19)	Marin Marić (15)	Tseng Po-Yu (6)	Hsinchu County Stadium; 5,541	18–13
32	April 19	@ Dreamers	L 86–92	Kao Kuo-Hao (21)	Drew Pember (8); Marin Marić (8)	Drew Pember (6)	Taichung Intercontinental Basketball Stadium; 3,000	18–14
33	April 25	@ Mars	W 104–86	Lu Kuan-Hsuan (27)	Marin Marić (15)	Tseng Po-Yu (6)	Taipei Heping Basketball Gymnasium; 4,653	19–14
34	April 29	Kings	W 98–78	Marin Marić (31)	Marin Marić (18)	Tseng Po-Yu (7)	Hsinchu County Stadium; 3,761	20–14

May : 2–0 (home: 2–0; road: 0–0)

Game	Date	Team	Score	High points	High rebounds	High assists	Location Attendance	Record
35	May 2	Mars	W 96–73	Liu Cheng-Hsun (21)	Drew Pember (10)	Marin Marić (5); Tsai Cheng-Kang (5)	Hsinchu County Stadium; 5,050	21–14
36	May 3	Aquas	W 102–99	Drew Pember (24)	Marin Marić (12)	Drew Pember (11)	Hsinchu County Stadium; 4,887	22–14

Color： Win Lose
Schedule

== Playoffs ==
=== Game log ===
2026 playoffs game log
Total: 1–3 (home: 0–2; road: 1–1)
Semifinals : 1–3 (home: 0–2; road: 1–1)

Game	Date	Team	Score	High points	High rebounds	High assists	Location Attendance	Series
1	May 9	@ Dreamers	W 97–94	Marin Marić (21)	Marin Marić (11)	Tseng Po-Yu (7)	Taichung Intercontinental Basketball Stadium; 3,000	1–0
2	May 12	@ Dreamers	L 61–83	Lu Kuan-Hsuan (13)	Drew Pember (14)	Tseng Po-Yu (6)	Taichung Intercontinental Basketball Stadium; 3,000	1–1
3	May 14	Dreamers	L 106–114	Marin Marić (23)	Marin Marić (11)	Drew Pember (5); Marin Marić (5)	Hsinchu County Stadium; 5,127	1–2
4	May 16	Dreamers	L 93–104	Marin Marić (24)	Marin Marić (10)	Lu Kuan-Hsuan (6)	Hsinchu County Stadium; 6,055	1–3

Color： Win Lose
Schedule

== Player statistics ==
Legend
GP	Games played	MPG	Minutes per game	FG%	Field goal percentage
3P%	3-point field goal percentage	FT%	Free throw percentage	RPG	Rebounds per game
APG	Assists per game	SPG	Steals per game	BPG	Blocks per game
PPG	Points per game		Led the league

=== Regular season ===
Player	GP	MPG	PPG	FG%	3P%	FT%	RPG	APG	SPG	BPG
Li Han-Sheng^{‡}	6	12:02	2.7	30.0%	23.1%	50.0%	1.0	2.0	0.2	0.0
Jade Tse^{≠}	14	11:45	4.4	36.2%	50.0%	70.0%	1.3	1.6	0.7	0.0
Drew Pember	34	35:24	18.8	49.7%	32.3%	78.3%	11.5	2.9	1.4	1.1
Craig Sword^{≠‡}	6	23:49	17.2	46.5%	27.8%	81.3%	4.7	2.0	2.3	0.5
Kao Kuo-Hao	32	32:32	14.7	44.8%	38.7%	78.3%	3.2	3.4	1.6	0.0
Tseng Po-Yu	34	31:11	9.9	40.5%	25.3%	68.2%	3.0	6.0	0.9	0.1
Chu Yun-Hao	15	9:32	3.5	34.0%	32.3%	77.8%	1.1	0.5	0.1	0.1
Tien Hao	19	5:11	2.2	31.7%	28.6%	76.9%	0.3	0.8	0.3	0.0
Liu Cheng-Hsun	36	25:26	8.1	37.4%	37.0%	79.6%	3.4	1.6	0.8	0.3
Hsiao Shun-Yi	15	13:28	3.7	43.8%	18.8%	61.1%	1.5	0.7	0.5	0.0
Lee Chia-Jui	10	2:38	0.7	18.2%	28.6%	50.0%	0.9	0.1	0.0	0.1
Tsai Cheng-Kang	33	18:19	6.2	37.1%	28.0%	68.1%	2.7	1.2	0.5	0.4
Anžejs Pasečņiks	20	29:05	11.8	57.2%	0.0%	42.9%	7.8	1.7	0.9	1.4
TJ Holyfield	32	30:14	10.9	49.1%	33.3%	74.7%	7.8	2.0	1.4	0.8
Karl Breuer	4	2:03	0.8	50.0%	0.0%	100.0%	0.0	0.0	0.3	0.0
Marin Marić^{≠}	14	29:35	16.4	47.7%	29.5%	69.6%	11.8	2.3	1.6	0.6
Sim Bhullar^{≠}	1	28:26	15.0	100.0%	0.0%	42.9%	9.0	1.0	0.0	0.0
Lu Kuan-Hsuan	36	18:43	7.0	35.1%	33.1%	77.3%	1.3	1.5	0.5	0.1
Lee Chi-Wei	22	13:09	3.5	33.8%	26.3%	81.8%	1.5	1.2	0.5	0.1

^{‡} Left during the season
^{≠} Acquired during the season

=== Semifinals ===
Player	GP	MPG	PPG	FG%	3P%	FT%	RPG	APG	SPG	BPG
Jade Tse	3	10:55	3.7	41.7%	50.0%	0.0%	0.3	1.3	0.7	0.0
Drew Pember	3	34:34	10.0	34.8%	26.7%	90.9%	9.7	2.3	1.3	0.7
Kao Kuo-Hao	4	28:02	6.0	24.2%	21.1%	57.1%	1.5	2.8	1.3	0.0
Tseng Po-Yu	4	25:14	7.3	22.2%	7.7%	80.0%	3.5	3.8	0.3	0.0
Chu Yun-Hao	1	4:00	0.0	0.0%	0.0%	0.0%	1.0	0.0	0.0	0.0
Tien Hao	Did not play									
Liu Cheng-Hsun	4	26:07	9.3	42.9%	38.9%	85.7%	3.8	0.8	0.0	0.3
Hsiao Shun-Yi	2	3:45	0.5	0.0%	0.0%	50.0%	1.0	0.0	0.5	0.0
Lee Chia-Jui	1	0:26	0.0	0.0%	0.0%	0.0%	0.0	0.0	0.0	0.0
Tsai Cheng-Kang	4	24:50	12.0	54.5%	46.2%	66.7%	4.3	3.0	1.3	0.8
Anžejs Pasečņiks	3	27:06	6.7	47.6%	0.0%	0.0%	5.3	1.7	0.3	1.0
TJ Holyfield	2	32:56	15.5	78.6%	66.7%	75.0%	6.5	2.5	1.0	0.0
Karl Breuer	Did not play									
Marin Marić	4	32:34	19.3	46.0%	35.7%	74.3%	10.0	2.5	0.0	0.5
Lu Kuan-Hsuan	4	27:33	12.3	34.9%	24.1%	100.0%	1.0	3.3	0.5	0.0
Lee Chi-Wei	1	6:53	0.0	0.0%	0.0%	0.0%	1.0	1.0	0.0	0.0

- Reference：

== Transactions ==
On March 9, 2026, Sim Bhullar was not registered in the 2025–26 TPBL season final rosters.

=== Overview ===
Players added

Via draft

- Liu Cheng-Hsun

Via free agency

- Sim Bhullar
- Karl Breuer
- TJ Holyfield
- Marin Marić
- Anžejs Pasečņiks
- Drew Pember
- Isaiah Reese
- Craig Sword
- Jade Tse
Players lost

Via free agency

- Chiang Kuang-Chien
- Chou Po-Hsun
- Earl Clark
- Iong Ngai-San
- Nate Laszewski
- Kennedy Meeks
- Landers Nolley
- Wang Tzu-Kang

Waived

- Li Han-Sheng
- Isaiah Reese
- Craig Sword

=== Free agency ===
==== Additions ====
Date	Player	Contract terms	Former team	Ref.
August 13, 2025	Anžejs Pasečņiks	—N/a	(Turkey) Tofaş	
August 14, 2025	Liu Cheng-Hsun	—N/a	(Taiwan) UCH	
August 20, 2025	Isaiah Reese	—N/a	(Greece) Promitheas Patras	
August 22, 2025	TJ Holyfield	—N/a	(Japan) Yamagata Wyverns	
August 26, 2025	Drew Pember	—N/a	(Montenegro) KK Mornar Bar	
September 10, 2025	Karl Breuer	Trainee contract, worth unknown	(Taiwan) NTUA	
October 23, 2025	Craig Sword	—N/a	(Taiwan) Kaohsiung Aquas	
December 26, 2025	Sim Bhullar	—N/a	(Taiwan) Tainan TSG GhostHawks	
March 2, 2026	Marin Marić	—N/a	(China) Shenzhen Leopards	
March 6, 2026	Jade Tse	—N/a	(Taiwan) Yankey Ark	

==== Subtractions ====
Date	Player	Reason	New team	Ref.
May 14, 2025	Earl Clark	Contract expired	(United States) DMV Trilogy	
May 24, 2025	Landers Nolley	Contract expired	(Lebanon) Homenetmen Beirut	
June 17, 2025	Chou Po-Hsun	Contract expired	Taiwan Beer	
June 17, 2025	Iong Ngai-San	Contract expired	Macau Slot	
June 17, 2025	Wang Tzu-Kang	Contract expired	(Taiwan) Keelung Black Kites	
June 17, 2025	Chiang Kuang-Chien	Contract expired	(Taiwan) Keelung Black Kites	
August 24, 2025	Nate Laszewski	Contract expired	(Israel) Maccabi Ra'anana	
August 26, 2025	Kennedy Meeks	Contract expired	(Japan) Saitama Broncos	
November 22, 2025	Isaiah Reese	Contract terminated	(Russia) BC Uralmash Yekaterinburg	
December 26, 2025	Craig Sword	Contract terminated	(Mexico) Rayos de Hermosillo	
January 2, 2026	Li Han-Sheng	Contract terminated	(Taiwan) Yankey Ark	

== Awards ==
=== Yearly awards ===
Recipient	Award	Ref.
Kao Kuo-Hao	Clutch Play of the Year	
Kao Kuo-Hao	All-Defensive First Team	
Kao Kuo-Hao	All-TPBL First Team	
Lu Kuan-Hsuan	Assist of the Year	
Drew Pember	All-TPBL Second Team	
Hsinchu Toplus Lioneers	Home-Court of the Year	
Ready	Most Popular Mascot of the Year	
Liu Cheng-Hsun	Rookie of the Year	
Tseng Po-Yu	Most Improved Player	

=== Player of the Week ===
Week	Recipient	Award	Ref.
3	Drew Pember	Week 3 Player of the Week	
6	Drew Pember	Week 6 Player of the Week	
11	Drew Pember	Week 11 Player of the Week	
14	Kao Kuo-Hao	Week 14 Player of the Week	
20	Drew Pember	Week 20 Player of the Week	
22	Drew Pember	Week 22 Player of the Week	
27	Liu Cheng-Hsun	Week 27 Player of the Week	
