= 2025–26 Taoyuan Taiwan Beer Leopards season =

Taiwanese professional basketball season

- President: Liu Chin-Liang
- Head Coach: Henrik Rödl
- Arena: Taoyuan Arena; Taoyuan City Zhongli Civil Sports Center

TPBL results
- Record: 23–13 (63.9%)
- Place: 1st
- Playoffs finish: Semifinals (lost to Kings, 1–3)

Player records
- Points: Lasan Kromah 24.2
- Rebounds: Cheick Diallo 11.6
- Assists: Lasan Kromah 6.5

The 2025–26 Taoyuan Taiwan Beer Leopards season was the franchise's fifth season, its second season in the Taiwan Professional Basketball League (TPBL).

On July 22, 2025, the Leopards announced that Charles Dubé-Brais had left the team. And the Leopards hired Henrik Rödl as their new head coach.

== Draft ==
Round	Pick	Player	Position(s)	School / club team
1	3	Hsu Hong-Wei	Guard	UCH

- Reference：

== Roster ==
2025–26 Taoyuan Taiwan Beer Leopards roster
Players
Coaches

Pos.	No.	Nat.	Name	Ht.	Wt.	Age	From
PG	5	(Taiwan)	Gao Jin-Wei	1.72 m (5 ft 8 in)	66 kg (146 lb)	25 – 23 October 2000	UCH
PG	6	(Taiwan)	Hsu Hong-Wei	1.73 m (5 ft 8 in)	77 kg (170 lb)	23 – 15 October 2002	UCH
PF	7	(United States)	Chris McCullough (I)	2.06 m (6 ft 9 in)	91 kg (201 lb)	31 – 5 February 1995	Syracuse
SG	8	(Taiwan)	Wang Jhe-Yu	1.90 m (6 ft 3 in)	88 kg (194 lb)	24 – 18 March 2002	NTUST
SF	10	(Taiwan)	Ting Kuang-Hao	1.92 m (6 ft 4 in)	86 kg (190 lb)	25 – 23 October 2000	UCH
G	11	(Taiwan)	Chuang Po-Yuan	1.85 m (6 ft 1 in)	85 kg (187 lb)	25 – 1 December 2000	FJU
SF	12	(Taiwan)	Lin Sin-Kuan	1.92 m (6 ft 4 in)	97 kg (214 lb)	24 – 9 May 2002	NTNU
SF	13	(United States)	Malcolm Miller (I)	2.01 m (6 ft 7 in)	95 kg (209 lb)	33 – 6 March 1993	Holy Cross
F	21	(Taiwan)	Wang Hao-Chi (C)	1.95 m (6 ft 5 in)	95 kg (209 lb)	36 – 22 September 1989	HWU
SF	24	(Liberia) (United States)	Lasan Kromah (I)	1.98 m (6 ft 6 in)	91 kg (201 lb)	34 – 24 June 1991	UConn
SF	27	(Taiwan)	Huang Jhen	1.93 m (6 ft 4 in)	86 kg (190 lb)	35 – 27 June 1990	FJU
SF	31	(Taiwan)	Tung Yung-Chuan	1.90 m (6 ft 3 in)	92 kg (203 lb)	26 – 14 October 1999	NTNU
PF	33	(Mali)	Cheick Diallo (I)	2.03 m (6 ft 8 in)	99 kg (218 lb)	29 – 13 September 1996	Kansas
PG	57	(Taiwan) (Vietnam)	Tsao Xun-Xiang	1.83 m (6 ft 0 in)	80 kg (176 lb)	27 – 16 March 1999	NTUA
PG	72	(Taiwan)	Lu Chi-Erh	1.87 m (6 ft 2 in)	80 kg (176 lb)	34 – 15 January 1992	NKNU
C	82	(Taiwan)	Liu Yuan-Kai	2.06 m (6 ft 9 in)	105 kg (231 lb)	34 – 9 July 1991	FJU

Head coach

- (Germany) Henrik Rödl

Assistant coach(es)

- (Taiwan) (Australia) Oscar Lin
- (Canada) Vincent Plante

Strength & conditioning coach(es)

- (Taiwan) Chen Tzu-Yi
- (Taiwan) Chen Ting-Wei

Athletic trainer(s)

- (Taiwan) Chen Wei-Chih
- (Taiwan) Cheng Po-Wei

Legend

- (C) Team captain
- (I) Import player
- Injured

- Roster
Updated: May 10, 2026

== 2025 Fujian Homologous Cup ==
Lin Sin-Kuan, Gao Jin-Wei, Lu Chi-Erh, and Chen Chun-Han did not participate in these invitational games. The Taoyuan Taiwan Beer Leopards invited Tseng Hsin-Wu, Wei Peng-He, and Hsu Hong-Wei to join the team as the testing players in these invitational games.

=== Game log ===
July 26, 2025
20:00 (UTC+8)

Fujian Sturgeons	100–69	Taoyuan Taiwan Beer Leopards

Xiang'an Sports Exchange Center, Xiamen

July 28, 2025
17:30 (UTC+8)

Taoyuan Taiwan Beer Leopards	112–87	Macau Hou Chon

Xiang'an Sports Exchange Center, Xiamen

July 29, 2025
19:30 (UTC+8)

Hong Kong Hon Friends	67–89	Taoyuan Taiwan Beer Leopards

Xiang'an Sports Exchange Center, Xiamen

== 2025 The Asian Tournament Chengdu Leg ==
Gao Jin-Wei did not participate in these games.

=== Preliminary round ===
August 18, 2025	Taoyuan Leopards	89–98	Aces	Chengdu
19:00 (UTC+8)	Scoring by quarter: 23–22, 24–22, 18–27, 24–27
	Pts: Lin Sin-Kuan 22; Rebs: Tony Mitchell 13; Asts: Tsao Xun-Xiang 3	boxscore	Pts: Mohamed Koné 25; Rebs: Seny N'Diaye 12; Asts: Mohamed Koné 4	Arena: Qingbaijiang Culture & Sports Center

August 19, 2025	Loong Lions	39–97	Taoyuan Leopards	Chengdu
19:00 (UTC+8)	Scoring by quarter: 7–23, 13–24, 10–20, 9–30
	Pts: Cui Zhibo 8 Rebs: Cui Zhibo 8 Asts: Cui Zhibo 2	boxscore	Pts: Chuang Po-Yuan 19; Rebs: Liu Yuan-Kai 11; Asts: Wang Jhe-Yu 5	Arena: Qingbaijiang Culture & Sports Center

August 20, 2025	Taoyuan Leopards	95–71	Hong Kong VantaBlack Dragons	Chengdu
14:00 (UTC+8)	Scoring by quarter: 14–17, 32–11, 24–23, 25–20
	Pts: Tony Mitchell 16; Rebs: Tony Mitchell 7 Asts: Tsao Xun-Xiang 9	boxscore	Pts: Derrik Jamerson 20; Rebs: Derrik Jamerson 8 Asts: Choe Sung-Hyun 4	Arena: Qingbaijiang Culture & Sports Center

August 22, 2025	Shenzhen New Century II	68–86	Taoyuan Leopards	Chengdu
17:00 (UTC+8)	Scoring by quarter: 15–27, 11–22, 21–13, 21–24
	Pts: Ma Haosen 22; Rebs: Ma Haosen 5 Asts: Wu Kaibo 4	boxscore	Pts: Tony Mitchell 17; Rebs: Tony Mitchell 9 Asts: three players 6	Arena: Qingbaijiang Culture & Sports Center

August 23, 2025	Taoyuan Leopards	110–104	Macau Black Bears	Chengdu
18:00 (UTC+8)	Scoring by quarter: 34–21, 20–37, 31–19, 25–27
	Pts: Lin Sin-Kuan 32; Rebs: Tony Mitchell 21; Asts: Tsao Xun-Xiang 7	boxscore	Pts: Omari Peek-Green 34; Rebs: Omari Peek-Green 9 Asts: Jenning Leung 5	Arena: Jianyang Donglai Impression Gymnasium

=== Finals ===
August 24, 2025	Macau Black Bears	105–114	Taoyuan Leopards	Chengdu
20:00 (UTC+8)	Scoring by quarter: 29–27, 26–31, 34–27, 16–29
	Pts: Terrell Smith 40; Rebs: Omari Peek-Green 8 Asts: Terrell Smith 6	boxscore	Pts: Lin Sin-Kuan 28; Rebs: Tony Mitchell 18; Asts: Tsao Xun-Xiang 8	Arena: Jianyang Donglai Impression Gymnasium

== Friendship Match 2025 Kumamoto Volters vs Taiwan Beer Leopards in Taiwan ==
Recap

September 6, 2025
17:00 (UTC+8)

Kumamoto Volters	58–69	Taoyuan Taiwan Beer Leopards

Yangmei Sports Park, Taoyuan City

== Preseason ==
=== Game log ===
2025 preseason game log
Total: 0–2 (home: 0–1; road: 0–1)
Preseason : 0–2 (home: 0–1; road: 0–1)

Game	Date	Team	Score	High points	High rebounds	High assists	Location Attendance	Record
1	October 4	@ DEA	L 81–101	Chris McCullough (23)	Malcolm Miller (10)	Tsao Xun-Xiang (5)	Pingtung County Stadium	0–1
2	October 5	Kings	L 89–99	Lin Sin-Kuan (20)	Cheick Diallo (14)	Gao Jin-Wei (7)	Pingtung County Stadium	0–2

Color： Win Lose
Schedule

== Regular season ==
=== Standings ===
Pos	Team	Pld	W	L	PCT	GB	Qualification
1	Taoyuan Taiwan Beer Leopards	36	23	13	.639	—	Advance to semifinals
2	Formosa Dreamers	36	22	14	.611	1	Advance to semifinals
3	Hsinchu Toplus Lioneers	36	22	14	.611	1	Advance to semifinals
4	New Taipei CTBC DEA	36	20	16	.556	3	Advance to play-in
5	New Taipei Kings	36	19	17	.528	4	Advance to play-in
6	Taipei Taishin Mars	36	11	25	.306	12	
7	Kaohsiung Aquas	36	9	27	.250	14	

Source: TPBL

With a victory against the Formosa Dreamers on April 26, 2026, the Leopards clinched the league's best record for the 2025–26 season.

=== Game log ===
2025–26 regular season game log
Total: 23–13 (home: 14–4; road: 9–9)
October : 2–0 (home: 0–0; road: 2–0)

Game	Date	Team	Score	High points	High rebounds	High assists	Location Attendance	Record
1	October 19	@ Dreamers	W 104–83	Lasan Kromah (30)	Chris McCullough (13)	Lasan Kromah (13)	Taichung Intercontinental Basketball Stadium; 2,637	1–0
2	October 26	@ DEA	W 104–80	Lasan Kromah (25)	Malcolm Miller (10)	Malcolm Miller (4); Lasan Kromah (4)	Xinzhuang Gymnasium; 5,050	2–0

November : 6–1 (home: 4–1; road: 2–0)

Game	Date	Team	Score	High points	High rebounds	High assists	Location Attendance	Record
3	November 2	@ Aquas	W 100–78	Malcolm Miller (28)	Malcolm Miller (11)	Gao Jin-Wei (8)	Kaohsiung Arena; 3,544	3–0
4	November 8	Mars	W 122–102	Lasan Kromah (29)	Malcolm Miller (14)	Gao Jin-Wei (6); Lasan Kromah (6)	Taoyuan Arena; 6,023	4–0
5	November 9	DEA	W 85–78	Chris McCullough (29)	Chris McCullough (12)	Lasan Kromah (7)	Taoyuan Arena; 4,748	5–0
6	November 16	@ Mars	W 112–102	Lasan Kromah (29)	Cheick Diallo (22)	Lasan Kromah (9)	Taipei Heping Basketball Gymnasium; 4,336	6–0
7	November 19	Aquas	L 90–112	Gao Jin-Wei (19)	Chris McCullough (9)	Tsao Xun-Xiang (9)	Taoyuan Arena; 2,933	6–1
8	November 22	Kings	W 103–101	Lasan Kromah (31)	Malcolm Miller (12)	Tsao Xun-Xiang (7)	Taoyuan Arena; 5,917	7–1
9	November 23	DEA	W 100–77	Cheick Diallo (21)	Chris McCullough (13); Cheick Diallo (13)	Tsao Xun-Xiang (8)	Taoyuan Arena; 5,029	8–1

December : 2–3 (home: 2–0; road: 0–3)

Game	Date	Team	Score	High points	High rebounds	High assists	Location Attendance	Record
10	December 6	Lioneers	W 96–94	Cheick Diallo (20)	Malcolm Miller (11)	Lasan Kromah (9)	Taoyuan Arena; 5,827	9–1
11	December 7	Dreamers	W 105–92	Lasan Kromah (29)	Malcolm Miller (13)	Lasan Kromah (7)	Taoyuan Arena; 5,793	10–1
12	December 13	@ DEA	L 75–85	Lasan Kromah (31)	Lasan Kromah (12)	Tsao Xun-Xiang (5)	Xinzhuang Gymnasium; 5,231	10–2
13	December 20	@ Kings	L 103–125	Lasan Kromah (23)	Chris McCullough (12)	Lasan Kromah (7)	Xinzhuang Gymnasium; 4,362	10–3
14	December 24	@ Lioneers	L 82–98	Malcolm Miller (18)	Malcolm Miller (16)	Gao Jin-Wei (7)	Hsinchu County Stadium; 4,158	10–4

January : 4–1 (home: 2–0; road: 2–1)

Game	Date	Team	Score	High points	High rebounds	High assists	Location Attendance	Record
15	January 3	@ Aquas	W 108–102	Cheick Diallo (22)	Cheick Diallo (11)	Lasan Kromah (11)	Kaohsiung Arena; 4,810	11–4
16	January 9	Kings	W 110–87	Lasan Kromah (24)	Cheick Diallo (12)	Tsao Xun-Xiang (7)	Taoyuan City Zhongli Civil Sports Center; 2,000	12–4
17	January 11	@ Mars	L 108–114	Lasan Kromah (31)	Cheick Diallo (15)	Gao Jin-Wei (9)	Taipei Heping Basketball Gymnasium; 4,071	12–5
18	January 18	@ Dreamers	W 98–91	Lasan Kromah (22)	Lasan Kromah (11)	Gao Jin-Wei (8)	Taichung Intercontinental Basketball Stadium; 3,000	13–5
19	January 31	Lioneers	W 92–88	Lasan Kromah (26)	Lasan Kromah (13)	Gao Jin-Wei (6); Lasan Kromah (6)	Taoyuan City Zhongli Civil Sports Center; 2,000	14–5

February : 3–1 (home: 2–1; road: 1–0)

Game	Date	Team	Score	High points	High rebounds	High assists	Location Attendance	Record
20	February 1	Mars	W 98–87	Chris McCullough (26)	Chris McCullough (15)	Lasan Kromah (5); Tsao Xun-Xiang (5)	Taoyuan City Zhongli Civil Sports Center; 2,000	15–5
21	February 7	@ Aquas	W 101–75	Cheick Diallo (24)	Cheick Diallo (12)	Lasan Kromah (8)	Kaohsiung Arena; 5,075	16–5
22	February 14	Dreamers	L 98–100	Malcolm Miller (23)	Cheick Diallo (18)	Gao Jin-Wei (8)	Taoyuan City Zhongli Civil Sports Center; 2,000	16–6
23	February 15	DEA	W 96–93	Gao Jin-Wei (29)	Cheick Diallo (15)	Chris McCullough (7)	Taoyuan City Zhongli Civil Sports Center; 2,000	17–6

March : 2–4 (home: 0–2; road: 2–2)

Game	Date	Team	Score	High points	High rebounds	High assists	Location Attendance	Record
24	March 4	@ Kings	W 116–100	Lasan Kromah (30)	Chris McCullough (18)	Lasan Kromah (9)	Xinzhuang Gymnasium; 3,367	18–6
25	March 7	Lioneers	L 111–114	Lasan Kromah (42)	Cheick Diallo (8); Malcolm Miller (8)	Gao Jin-Wei (4); Lasan Kromah (4)	Taoyuan City Zhongli Civil Sports Center; 2,000	18–7
26	March 8	Kings	L 101–114	Chris McCullough (29)	Chris McCullough (13)	Gao Jin-Wei (7)	Taoyuan City Zhongli Civil Sports Center; 2,000	18–8
27	March 15	@ Dreamers	L 84–111	Cheick Diallo (27)	Cheick Diallo (8)	Lasan Kromah (7)	Taichung Intercontinental Basketball Stadium; 2,556	18–9
28	March 21	@ Mars	W 99–73	Lasan Kromah (22)	Cheick Diallo (12)	Lasan Kromah (10)	Taipei Heping Basketball Gymnasium; 5,076	19–9
29	March 29	@ Lioneers	L 91–102	Lasan Kromah (31)	Malcolm Miller (12)	Gao Jin-Wei (6); Lasan Kromah (6)	Hsinchu County Stadium; 5,007	19–10

April : 4–2 (home: 4–0; road: 0–2)

Game	Date	Team	Score	High points	High rebounds	High assists	Location Attendance	Record
30	April 4	Aquas	W 105–74	Lasan Kromah (21)	Cheick Diallo (15)	Lasan Kromah (6)	Taoyuan City Zhongli Civil Sports Center; 2,000	20–10
31	April 5	Mars	W 107–96	Lasan Kromah (26)	Chris McCullough (10)	Lasan Kromah (7)	Taoyuan City Zhongli Civil Sports Center; 2,000	21–10
32	April 11	@ Lioneers	L 76–79	Malcolm Miller (28)	Chris McCullough (18)	Lasan Kromah (6)	Hsinchu County Stadium; 6,012	21–11
33	April 18	@ DEA	L 93–107	Gao Jin-Wei (26)	Gao Jin-Wei (8); Lasan Kromah (8)	Lasan Kromah (7)	Xinzhuang Gymnasium; 5,011	21–12
34	April 25	Aquas	W 99–85	Cheick Diallo (31)	Cheick Diallo (18)	Gao Jin-Wei (11)	Taoyuan Arena; 5,733	22–12
35	April 26	Dreamers	W 104–100	Lasan Kromah (35)	Cheick Diallo (11)	Gao Jin-Wei (6)	Taoyuan Arena; 6,033	23–12

May : 0–1 (home: 0–0; road: 0–1)

Game	Date	Team	Score	High points	High rebounds	High assists	Location Attendance	Record
36	May 2	@ Kings	L 94–97	Malcolm Miller (24)	Chris McCullough (18)	Tsao Xun-Xiang (5)	Xinzhuang Gymnasium; 5,185	23–13

Color： Win Lose
Schedule

== Playoffs ==
=== Game log ===
2026 playoffs game log
Total: 1–3 (home: 1–1; road: 0–2)
Semifinals : 1–3 (home: 1–1; road: 0–2)

Game	Date	Team	Score	High points	High rebounds	High assists	Location Attendance	Series
1	May 10	Kings	L 105–113	Lasan Kromah (29)	Malcolm Miller (11); Lasan Kromah (11)	Lasan Kromah (12)	Taoyuan Arena; 5,508	0–1
2	May 13	Kings	W 114–92	Malcolm Miller (29)	Chris McCullough (8)	Lasan Kromah (9)	Taoyuan Arena; 3,520	1–1
3	May 15	@ Kings	L 102–104	Lasan Kromah (26)	Chris McCullough (8)	Lasan Kromah (12)	Taipei Heping Basketball Gymnasium; 5,591	1–2
4	May 17	@ Kings	L 114–116	Gao Jin-Wei (32)	Malcolm Miller (7)	Lasan Kromah (8)	Taipei Heping Basketball Gymnasium; 5,838	1–3

Color： Win Lose
Schedule

== Player statistics ==
Legend
GP	Games played	MPG	Minutes per game	FG%	Field goal percentage
3P%	3-point field goal percentage	FT%	Free throw percentage	RPG	Rebounds per game
APG	Assists per game	SPG	Steals per game	BPG	Blocks per game
PPG	Points per game		Led the league

=== Regular season ===
Player	GP	MPG	PPG	FG%	3P%	FT%	RPG	APG	SPG	BPG
Gao Jin-Wei	36	33:51	14.6	42.0%	39.5%	88.4%	3.9	4.9	1.1	0.2
Hsu Hong-Wei	29	5:33	1.3	38.9%	41.2%	75.0%	0.3	0.3	0.2	0.1
Chris McCullough	24	28:26	15.9	48.9%	24.0%	59.8%	10.6	1.5	1.6	1.3
Wang Jhe-Yu	21	5:35	1.6	39.4%	28.6%	100.0%	0.9	0.1	0.3	0.0
Ting Kuang-Hao	12	2:31	0.4	33.3%	33.3%	0.0%	0.2	0.2	0.0	0.0
Chuang Po-Yuan	36	28:07	5.6	41.2%	39.0%	67.9%	1.9	0.9	0.8	0.2
Lin Sin-Kuan	34	27:16	10.1	36.7%	26.0%	73.0%	3.3	2.1	1.1	0.2
Malcolm Miller	30	32:09	15.9	50.7%	29.1%	68.4%	8.9	2.1	1.2	1.4
Wang Hao-Chi	34	17:40	3.9	32.6%	31.5%	61.5%	1.9	0.5	0.3	0.1
Lasan Kromah	30	35:41	24.2	45.6%	30.1%	78.9%	7.0	6.5	2.8	0.8
Huang Jhen	11	2:12	0.5	25.0%	14.3%	50.0%	0.6	0.1	0.0	0.0
Tung Yung-Chuan	29	14:16	2.0	29.2%	28.9%	61.5%	1.8	0.5	0.4	0.2
Cheick Diallo	24	27:57	19.0	60.9%	0.0%	67.2%	11.6	1.4	0.7	0.9
Tsao Xun-Xiang	36	19:36	5.0	40.0%	35.2%	45.0%	2.3	3.7	0.6	0.0
Lu Chi-Erh	Did not play									
Liu Yuan-Kai	16	2:24	0.6	66.7%	0.0%	83.3%	0.8	0.2	0.1	0.0

=== Semifinals ===
Player	GP	MPG	PPG	FG%	3P%	FT%	RPG	APG	SPG	BPG
Gao Jin-Wei	4	37:13	17.8	40.7%	41.7%	92.3%	4.8	4.5	1.5	0.3
Hsu Hong-Wei	1	3:03	0.0	0.0%	0.0%	0.0%	1.0	0.0	0.0	1.0
Chris McCullough	2	25:35	24.0	51.5%	40.0%	80.0%	8.0	1.0	1.0	0.5
Wang Jhe-Yu	Did not play									
Ting Kuang-Hao	Did not play									
Chuang Po-Yuan	4	27:38	4.8	37.5%	40.0%	50.0%	3.0	0.3	0.5	0.0
Lin Sin-Kuan	4	32:46	10.8	41.7%	31.6%	58.3%	3.8	2.0	1.5	0.5
Malcolm Miller	4	33:57	21.3	54.0%	52.9%	75.9%	7.5	3.0	1.5	0.5
Wang Hao-Chi	4	10:57	2.3	33.3%	28.6%	100.0%	1.5	0.8	0.8	0.0
Lasan Kromah	4	37:53	24.0	47.4%	35.3%	62.1%	6.3	10.3	3.5	0.3
Huang Jhen	1	2:41	0.0	0.0%	0.0%	0.0%	1.0	0.0	0.0	0.0
Tung Yung-Chuan	4	23:51	6.5	50.0%	50.0%	75.0%	3.3	0.3	2.0	0.0
Cheick Diallo	2	20:37	14.0	68.4%	0.0%	33.3%	4.0	0.0	0.5	0.5
Tsao Xun-Xiang	4	10:48	2.5	25.0%	0.0%	100.0%	2.5	1.0	0.0	0.0
Lu Chi-Erh	Did not play									
Liu Yuan-Kai	1	1:30	0.0	0.0%	0.0%	0.0%	0.0	0.0	0.0	0.0

- Reference：

== Transactions ==
=== Overview ===
Players added

Via draft

- Hsu Hong-Wei

Via free agency

- Cheick Diallo
- Chris McCullough
- Malcolm Miller
- Tsao Xun-Xiang
Players lost

Via free agency

- Chen Chun-Han
- Egidijus Mockevičius
- Axel Toupane
- Devin Williams

=== Free agency ===
==== Re-signed ====
Date	Player	Contract terms	Ref.
June 20, 2025	Lin Sin-Kuan	5-year contract with overseas option, worth unknown	
June 25, 2025	Gao Jin-Wei	7-year contract with overseas option, worth unknown	
July 4, 2025	Ting Kuang-Hao	—N/a	
July 9, 2025	Liu Yuan-Kai	—N/a	
July 14, 2025	Lasan Kromah	—N/a	

==== Additions ====
Date	Player	Contract terms	Former team	Ref.
July 11, 2025	Tsao Xun-Xiang	3-year contract, worth unknown	(Taiwan) Taipei Taishin Mars	
August 12, 2025	Cheick Diallo	—N/a	(Puerto Rico) Osos de Manatí	
August 15, 2025	Chris McCullough	—N/a	(Indonesia) Pelita Jaya	
August 20, 2025	Malcolm Miller	—N/a	(Taiwan) Taipei Taishin Mars	
October 3, 2025	Hsu Hong-Wei	—N/a	(Taiwan) UCH	

==== Subtractions ====
Date	Player	Reason	New team	Ref.
May 29, 2025	Devin Williams	Contract expired	(South Korea) Changwon LG Sakers	
August 12, 2025	Egidijus Mockevičius	Contract expired	(Uruguay) Club Atlético Aguada	
August 12, 2025	Axel Toupane	Contract expired	(Portugal) FC Porto	
September 11, 2025	Chen Chun-Han	Contract expired	(Taiwan) CPSHS basketball team assistant coach	

== Awards ==
=== Yearly awards ===
Recipient	Award	Ref.
Lasan Kromah	Points Leader	
Lasan Kromah	Steals Leader	
Lasan Kromah	All-Defensive First Team	
Lasan Kromah	Most Valuable Import	
Lasan Kromah	All-TPBL First Team	
Gao Jin-Wei	Block of the Year	
Gao Jin-Wei	All-TPBL First Team	
Gao Jin-Wei	Most Popular Player of the Year	
Gao Jin-Wei	Most Valuable Player	
Malcolm Miller	All-Defensive Second Team	
Henrik Rödl	Coach of the Year	
Yen Hsing-Su	General Manager of the Year	

=== Player of the Week ===
Week	Recipient	Award	Ref.
2	Lasan Kromah	Week 2 Player of the Week	
5	Lasan Kromah	Week 5 Player of the Week	
12	Cheick Diallo	Week 12 Player of the Week	
18	Gao Jin-Wei	Week 18 Player of the Week	
23	Lasan Kromah	Week 23 Player of the Week	
26	Cheick Diallo	Week 26 Player of the Week	

=== Player of the Month ===
Month	Recipient	Award	Ref.
October & November	Gao Jin-Wei	October & November Player of the Month (local)	
October & November	Lasan Kromah	October & November Player of the Month (import)	
January & February	Gao Jin-Wei	January & February Player of the Month (local)	
