= 2025–26 New Taipei CTBC DEA season =

Taiwanese professional basketball season

- President: Chen Kuo-En
- General Manager: Liu Chih-Wei
- Head Coach: Momir Ratković
- Arena: Xinzhuang Gymnasium; Taipei Heping Basketball Gymnasium

TPBL results
- Record: 20–16 (55.6%)
- Place: 4th
- Playoffs finish: Play-in (lost to Kings, 1–2)

Player records
- Points: Marko Todorović 22.0
- Rebounds: Marko Todorović 13.1
- Assists: Lin Wei-Han 5.3

The 2025–26 New Taipei CTBC DEA season was the franchise's fifth season, its second season in the Taiwan Professional Basketball League (TPBL).

On July 3, 2025, the DEA announced that Lee Yi-Hua left the team. On August 25, the DEA promoted Momir Ratković, the assistant coach of the New Taipei CTBC DEA, as their new head coach.

== Draft ==
Round	Pick	Player	Position(s)	School / club team
1	2	Tseng Hsin-Wu	Forward	NTNU

- Reference：

== Roster ==
2025–26 New Taipei CTBC DEA roster
Players
Coaches

Pos.	No.	Nat.	Name	Ht.	Wt.	Age	From
F	0	(Taiwan)	Mohammad Al Bachir Gadiaga	1.89 m (6 ft 2 in)	92 kg (203 lb)	28 – 27 April 1998	SHU
F	1	(Taiwan)	Li Ruei-Ci	1.93 m (6 ft 4 in)	87 kg (192 lb)	33 – 7 January 1993	TSU
F	2	(United States)	Beau Beech (I)	2.03 m (6 ft 8 in)	95 kg (209 lb)	32 – 1 March 1994	North Florida
G	3	(United States) (Taiwan)	Walter Lum	1.75 m (5 ft 9 in)	75 kg (165 lb)	26 – 24 February 2000	Whitman
G	5	(Taiwan)	Yu Wei-Hao	1.74 m (5 ft 9 in)	70 kg (154 lb)	24 – 24 October 2001	NTUA
G	7	(Taiwan)	Wei Chia-Hao	1.82 m (6 ft 0 in)	78 kg (172 lb)	26 – 13 January 2000	FJU
G	10	(Taiwan)	Hsieh Ya-Hsuan	1.87 m (6 ft 2 in)	81 kg (179 lb)	27 – 30 October 1998	UCH
F	11	(Montenegro)	Nemanja Radović (I)	2.08 m (6 ft 10 in)	113 kg (249 lb)	34 – 11 November 1991	Montenegro
F	12	(Taiwan)	Lin Jen-Hung	1.94 m (6 ft 4 in)	85 kg (187 lb)	32 – 18 December 1993	NTNU
F	14	(Taiwan)	Tseng Hsin-Wu	1.95 m (6 ft 5 in)	90 kg (198 lb)	23 – 22 March 2003	NTNU
G	16	(Taiwan)	Lin Wei-Han	1.80 m (5 ft 11 in)	71 kg (157 lb)	35 – 9 July 1990	FJU
F	18	(Sweden)	Viktor Gaddefors (I)	2.01 m (6 ft 7 in)	98 kg (216 lb)	33 – 8 October 1992	Sweden
F	19	(Montenegro)	Marko Todorović (I)	2.08 m (6 ft 10 in)	113 kg (249 lb)	34 – 19 April 1992	Montenegro
F	22	(Taiwan)	Huang Hung-Han	1.92 m (6 ft 4 in)	92 kg (203 lb)	31 – 15 October 1994	UCH
G	24	(Taiwan)	Jian Ting-Jhao	1.80 m (5 ft 11 in)	80 kg (176 lb)	28 – 16 January 1998	UCH
C	76	(Taiwan)	Tseng Wen-Ting (C)	2.04 m (6 ft 8 in)	98 kg (216 lb)	41 – 6 July 1984	TPEC
G	77	(Taiwan)	Li Pei-Cheng	1.81 m (5 ft 11 in)	79 kg (174 lb)	25 – 25 October 2000	FJU

Head coach

- (Serbia) Momir Ratković

Assistant coach(es)

- (Montenegro) Miloš Pavićević
- (Serbia) Jovica Ratković

Strength & conditioning coach(es)

- (Taiwan) Mu Chien-Hung

Athletic trainer(s)

- (Taiwan) Fan Hsiang-Yu
- (Taiwan) Li Kuo-Yi

Team manager

- (Taiwan) Liu Chih-Wei

Legend

- (C) Team captain
- (I) Import player
- Injured

- Roster
Updated: April 26, 2026

== International friendship match ==
September 8, 2025
15:00 (UTC+8)

Changwon LG Sakers	87–74	New Taipei CTBC DEA

CTBC administration building basketball court, Taipei City

== Preseason ==
=== Game log ===
2025 preseason game log
Total: 1–1 (home: 1–0; road: 0–1)
Preseason : 1–1 (home: 1–0; road: 0–1)

Game	Date	Team	Score	High points	High rebounds	High assists	Location Attendance	Record
1	October 3	@ Dreamers	L 109–111	Mohammad Al Bachir Gadiaga (26)	Nemanja Radović (11)	Viktor Gaddefors (6)	Pingtung County Stadium	0–1
2	October 4	Leopards	W 101–81	Mohammad Al Bachir Gadiaga (30)	Nemanja Radović (9)	Viktor Gaddefors (6)	Pingtung County Stadium	1–1

Color： Win Lose
Schedule

== Regular season ==
=== Standings ===
Pos	Team	Pld	W	L	PCT	GB	Qualification
1	Taoyuan Taiwan Beer Leopards	36	23	13	.639	—	Advance to semifinals
2	Formosa Dreamers	36	22	14	.611	1	Advance to semifinals
3	Hsinchu Toplus Lioneers	36	22	14	.611	1	Advance to semifinals
4	New Taipei CTBC DEA	36	20	16	.556	3	Advance to play-in
5	New Taipei Kings	36	19	17	.528	4	Advance to play-in
6	Taipei Taishin Mars	36	11	25	.306	12	
7	Kaohsiung Aquas	36	9	27	.250	14	

Source: TPBL

=== Game log ===
2025–26 regular season game log
Total: 20–16 (home: 13–5; road: 7–11)
October : 2–1 (home: 1–1; road: 1–0)

Game	Date	Team	Score	High points	High rebounds	High assists	Location Attendance	Record
1	October 18	@ Kings	W 105–89	Viktor Gaddefors (29)	Nemanja Radović (16)	Viktor Gaddefors (6)	Xinzhuang Gymnasium; 4,385	1–0
2	October 25	Mars	W 91–78	Nemanja Radović (16)	Viktor Gaddefors (11)	Viktor Gaddefors (10)	Xinzhuang Gymnasium; 5,851	2–0
3	October 26	Leopards	L 80–104	Nemanja Radović (19)	Pavlin Ivanov (11)	Hsieh Ya-Hsuan (6)	Xinzhuang Gymnasium; 5,050	2–1

November : 2–4 (home: 2–0; road: 0–4)

Game	Date	Team	Score	High points	High rebounds	High assists	Location Attendance	Record
4	November 1	Dreamers	W 99–91	Nemanja Radović (29)	Viktor Gaddefors (12)	Mohammad Al Bachir Gadiaga (5)	Xinzhuang Gymnasium; 4,034	3–1
5	November 2	Lioneers	W 94–91	Viktor Gaddefors (23)	Marko Todorović (11); Viktor Gaddefors (11)	Lin Wei-Han (8)	Xinzhuang Gymnasium; 4,108	4–1
6	November 7	@ Dreamers	L 87–92	Nemanja Radović (22)	Viktor Gaddefors (13)	Viktor Gaddefors (6)	Taichung Intercontinental Basketball Stadium; 2,280	4–2
7	November 9	@ Leopards	L 78–85	Nemanja Radović (23)	Nemanja Radović (18)	Viktor Gaddefors (5)	Taoyuan Arena; 4,748	4–3
8	November 15	@ Lioneers	L 85–102	Hsieh Ya-Hsuan (24); Nemanja Radović (24)	Marko Todorović (16)	Lin Wei-Han (5)	Hsinchu County Stadium; 5,532	4–4
9	November 23	@ Leopards	L 77–100	Nemanja Radović (19)	Nemanja Radović (11)	Lin Wei-Han (4); Nemanja Radović (4)	Taoyuan Arena; 5,029	4–5

December : 5–1 (home: 3–0; road: 2–1)

Game	Date	Team	Score	High points	High rebounds	High assists	Location Attendance	Record
10	December 6	@ Mars	W 108–104	Nemanja Radović (26)	Marko Todorović (11)	Viktor Gaddefors (5)	Taipei Heping Basketball Gymnasium; 5,169	5–5
11	December 13	Leopards	W 85–75	Marko Todorović (26)	Marko Todorović (17)	Mohammad Al Bachir Gadiaga (5); Hsieh Ya-Hsuan (5)	Xinzhuang Gymnasium; 5,231	6–5
12	December 14	Kings	W 114–111	Marko Todorović (34)	Marko Todorović (17)	Wei Chia-Hao (7); Hsieh Ya-Hsuan (7)	Xinzhuang Gymnasium; 5,063	7–5
13	December 21	@ Kings	L 78–85	Marko Todorović (26)	Marko Todorović (17)	Hsieh Ya-Hsuan (6)	Xinzhuang Gymnasium; 4,377	7–6
14	December 28	@ Dreamers	W 118–104	Marko Todorović (33)	Marko Todorović (19)	Marko Todorović (9)	Taichung Intercontinental Basketball Stadium; 3,000	8–6
15	December 31	Kings	W 94–82	Marko Todorović (27)	Viktor Gaddefors (16)	Hsieh Ya-Hsuan (7)	Xinzhuang Gymnasium; 4,143	9–6

January : 2–4 (home: 1–3; road: 1–1)

Game	Date	Team	Score	High points	High rebounds	High assists	Location Attendance	Record
16	January 3	Lioneers	L 79–84	Marko Todorović (25)	Marko Todorović (17)	Mohammad Al Bachir Gadiaga (6)	Xinzhuang Gymnasium; 4,872	9–7
17	January 4	Dreamers	L 115–122	Nemanja Radović (26)	Nemanja Radović (11)	Mohammad Al Bachir Gadiaga (9)	Xinzhuang Gymnasium; 4,091	9–8
18	January 10	@ Aquas	L 111–114	Marko Todorović (32)	Marko Todorović (20)	Lin Wei-Han (7)	Kaohsiung Arena; 4,950	9–9
19	January 17	@ Mars	W 95–79	Marko Todorović (24)	Marko Todorović (22)	Lin Wei-Han (10)	Taipei Heping Basketball Gymnasium; 4,550	10–9
20	January 24	Aquas	W 133–91	Marko Todorović (29)	Marko Todorović (9)	Lin Wei-Han (14)	Xinzhuang Gymnasium; 4,006	11–9
21	January 25	Mars	L 104–112	Marko Todorović (29)	Marko Todorović (11)	Lin Wei-Han (9)	Xinzhuang Gymnasium; 4,165	11–10

February : 1–1 (home: 0–0; road: 1–1)

Game	Date	Team	Score	High points	High rebounds	High assists	Location Attendance	Record
22	February 8	@ Aquas	W 113–84	Marko Todorović (26)	Nemanja Radović (11)	Lin Wei-Han (7)	Kaohsiung Arena; 4,659	12–10
23	February 15	@ Leopards	L 93–96	Marko Todorović (20)	Nemanja Radović (15)	Hsieh Ya-Hsuan (7)	Taoyuan City Zhongli Civil Sports Center; 2,000	12–11

March : 2–3 (home: 2–0; road: 0–3)

Game	Date	Team	Score	High points	High rebounds	High assists	Location Attendance	Record
24	March 8	@ Aquas	L 88–90	Mohammad Al Bachir Gadiaga (19)	Marko Todorović (16)	Lin Wei-Han (6)	Kaohsiung Arena; 3,908	12–12
25	March 14	@ Dreamers	L 91–100	Mohammad Al Bachir Gadiaga (24)	Marko Todorović (15)	Lin Wei-Han (7)	Taichung Intercontinental Basketball Stadium; 2,290	12–13
26	March 21	Aquas	W 118–91	Beau Beech (24)	Marko Todorović (8)	Marko Todorović (8)	Xinzhuang Gymnasium; 4,059	13–13
27	March 22	Lioneers	W 95–75	Marko Todorović (31)	Marko Todorović (18)	Lin Wei-Han (8)	Xinzhuang Gymnasium; 4,255	14–13
28	March 28	@ Lioneers	L 99–103	Mohammad Al Bachir Gadiaga (25)	Marko Todorović (11)	Lin Wei-Han (9)	Hsinchu County Stadium; 5,291	14–14

April : 5–2 (home: 4–1; road: 1–1)

Game	Date	Team	Score	High points	High rebounds	High assists	Location Attendance	Record
29	April 1	Mars	L 89–91	Mohammad Al Bachir Gadiaga (25)	Marko Todorović (12)	Lin Wei-Han (6)	Xinzhuang Gymnasium; 3,092	14–15
30	April 4	Dreamers	W 108–104	Nemanja Radović (23)	Viktor Gaddefors (13)	Mohammad Al Bachir Gadiaga (8)	Xinzhuang Gymnasium; 4,880	15–15
31	April 5	Kings	W 98–78	Viktor Gaddefors (20)	Viktor Gaddefors (15)	Hsieh Ya-Hsuan (8)	Xinzhuang Gymnasium; 4,983	16–15
32	April 8	@ Lioneers	L 100–117	Nemanja Radović (32)	Nemanja Radović (13)	Mohammad Al Bachir Gadiaga (6)	Hsinchu County Stadium; 3,327	16–16
33	April 18	Leopards	W 107–93	Nemanja Radović (23); Viktor Gaddefors (23)	Viktor Gaddefors (13)	Wei Chia-Hao (5)	Xinzhuang Gymnasium; 5,011	17–16
34	April 19	Aquas	W 115–99	Hsieh Ya-Hsuan (25)	Beau Beech (10)	Hsieh Ya-Hsuan (6)	Xinzhuang Gymnasium; 3,817	18–16
35	April 26	@ Mars	W 111–103	Nemanja Radović (27)	Viktor Gaddefors (14)	Hsieh Ya-Hsuan (8)	Taipei Heping Basketball Gymnasium; 4,022	19–16

May : 1–0 (home: 0–0; road: 1–0)

Game	Date	Team	Score	High points	High rebounds	High assists	Location Attendance	Record
36	May 3	@ Kings	W 111–87	Mohammad Al Bachir Gadiaga (23)	Viktor Gaddefors (9)	Lin Wei-Han (8)	Xinzhuang Gymnasium; 5,513	20–16

Color： Win Lose
Schedule

== Playoffs ==
=== Game log ===
2026 playoffs game log
Total: 0–2 (home: 0–1; road: 0–1)
Play-in : 0–2 (home: 0–1; road: 0–1)

Game	Date	Team	Score	High points	High rebounds	High assists	Location Attendance	Series
1	May 5	@ Kings	L 86–102	Hsieh Ya-Hsuan (28)	Marko Todorović (14)	Lin Wei-Han (6)	Xinzhuang Gymnasium; 2,323	1–1
2	May 6	Kings	L 90–96	Viktor Gaddefors (17)	Viktor Gaddefors (10); Nemanja Radović (10)	Viktor Gaddefors (5)	Taipei Heping Basketball Gymnasium; 2,479	1–2

Color： Win Lose
Schedule

=== Play-in note ===
- The fourth seed, New Taipei CTBC DEA, was awarded a one-win advantage before play-in series.

== Player statistics ==
Legend
GP	Games played	MPG	Minutes per game	FG%	Field goal percentage
3P%	3-point field goal percentage	FT%	Free throw percentage	RPG	Rebounds per game
APG	Assists per game	SPG	Steals per game	BPG	Blocks per game
PPG	Points per game		Led the league

=== Regular season ===
Player	GP	MPG	PPG	FG%	3P%	FT%	RPG	APG	SPG	BPG
Mohammad Al Bachir Gadiaga	34	37:24	17.9	44.0%	31.7%	79.7%	4.6	3.5	1.5	0.4
Li Ruei-Ci	5	5:04	2.8	54.5%	28.6%	0.0%	1.4	0.0	0.4	0.2
Beau Beech^{≠}	18	25:54	13.4	40.1%	38.6%	88.5%	6.3	1.4	1.4	0.3
Walter Lum	7	1:52	0.7	14.3%	20.0%	100.0%	0.3	0.1	0.1	0.0
Yu Wei-Hao	9	6:09	1.7	26.7%	28.6%	100.0%	0.7	0.2	0.3	0.0
Wei Chia-Hao	33	13:46	3.0	30.6%	29.0%	53.3%	1.3	2.0	1.1	0.0
Hsieh Ya-Hsuan	33	32:11	10.2	37.8%	30.7%	45.5%	3.3	4.5	1.6	0.3
Nemanja Radović	28	31:15	19.8	50.6%	31.9%	84.0%	9.4	1.7	1.2	0.8
Lin Jen-Hung	28	6:30	1.1	34.1%	12.5%	0.0%	0.8	0.3	0.4	0.0
Tseng Hsin-Wu	5	3:51	1.2	22.2%	25.0%	0.0%	0.4	0.0	0.0	0.2
Lin Wei-Han	31	26:55	7.5	34.1%	28.4%	76.3%	1.9	5.3	1.6	0.0
Viktor Gaddefors	30	31:55	13.9	60.1%	6.7%	55.1%	9.6	3.1	1.1	0.1
Marko Todorović	27	34:22	22.0	51.8%	34.6%	70.4%	13.1	2.7	1.8	0.8
Huang Hung-Han	34	9:30	1.5	29.4%	19.5%	66.7%	1.6	0.7	0.3	0.1
Jian Ting-Jhao	36	15:55	5.3	39.1%	42.0%	88.5%	1.0	1.1	0.4	0.0
Pavlin Ivanov^{‡}	3	23:05	9.0	36.0%	42.9%	75.0%	5.7	1.7	1.0	0.0
Nick King^{≠}	2	28:19	16.0	37.9%	27.3%	77.8%	6.5	2.5	0.5	0.5
Tseng Wen-Ting	31	11:15	2.8	49.2%	34.8%	55.2%	1.7	1.1	0.1	0.2
Li Pei-Cheng	19	6:23	1.4	27.3%	24.1%	50.0%	0.1	0.4	0.1	0.0

^{‡} Left during the season
^{≠} Acquired during the season

=== Play-in ===
Player	GP	MPG	PPG	FG%	3P%	FT%	RPG	APG	SPG	BPG
Mohammad Al Bachir Gadiaga	2	41:32	12.0	25.7%	15.0%	100.0%	2.5	3.0	0.5	0.5
Li Ruei-Ci	Did not play									
Beau Beech	Did not play									
Walter Lum	Did not play									
Yu Wei-Hao	Did not play									
Wei Chia-Hao	2	3:03	0.0	0.0%	0.0%	0.0%	0.5	0.0	0.0	0.0
Hsieh Ya-Hsuan	2	37:15	18.0	50.0%	43.8%	100.0%	4.5	2.5	1.0	0.5
Nemanja Radović	2	34:00	14.0	34.5%	18.2%	60.0%	11.5	1.5	1.0	0.5
Lin Jen-Hung	2	9:21	1.5	33.3%	50.0%	0.0%	1.5	1.0	0.5	0.0
Tseng Hsin-Wu	Did not play									
Lin Wei-Han	2	34:57	10.5	36.4%	31.3%	0.0%	4.5	5.0	2.5	0.0
Viktor Gaddefors	2	33:53	13.0	50.0%	0.0%	75.0%	7.5	4.5	1.0	0.0
Marko Todorović	2	22:59	12.0	38.1%	12.5%	77.8%	9.0	3.0	0.0	0.0
Huang Hung-Han	2	0:27	0.0	0.0%	0.0%	0.0%	0.0	0.0	0.0	0.0
Jian Ting-Jhao	2	18:06	4.5	30.8%	0.0%	100.0%	1.0	0.0	0.0	0.0
Tseng Wen-Ting	2	3:59	2.5	100.0%	100.0%	0.0%	2.0	0.5	0.0	0.0
Li Pei-Cheng	1	0:52	0.0	0.0%	0.0%	0.0%	0.0	0.0	0.0	0.0

- Reference：

== Transactions ==
On March 9, 2026, Nick King was not registered in the 2025–26 TPBL season final rosters.

=== Overview ===
Players Added

Via draft

- Tseng Hsin-Wu

Via trade

- Lin Jen-Hung

Via free agency

- Mohammad Al Bachir Gadiaga
- Beau Beech
- Viktor Gaddefors
- Pavlin Ivanov
- Jian Ting-Jhao
- Nick King
- Walter Lum
- Nemanja Radović
- Marko Todorović
Players lost

Via trade

- Shih Chin-Yao

Via free agency

- Ivan Aska
- Nysier Brooks
- Hsu Yu-Hui
- Kristijan Krajina
- Liu Jen-Hao
- Liu Min-Yan
- Daron Russell
- Zhou Cheng-Rui

Waived

- Pavlin Ivanov
- Lin Meng-Hsueh

=== Trades ===
Date	Trade		Ref.
July 22, 2025	To New Taipei CTBC DEA: Lin Jen-Hung	To Kaohsiung Aquas: Shih Chin-Yao	

=== Free agency ===
==== Re-signed ====
Date	Player	Contract terms	Ref.
August 25, 2025	Tseng Wen-Ting	3+2-year contract, worth unknown	
August 25, 2025	Lin Wei-Han	—N/a	
August 25, 2025	Wei Chia-Hao	—N/a	

==== Additions ====
Date	Player	Contract terms	Former team	Ref.
June 13, 2025	Mohammad Al Bachir Gadiaga	3+2-year contract, worth unknown	(Japan) Akita Northern Happinets	
July 21, 2025	Jian Ting-Jhao	Multi-year contract, worth unknown	(Taiwan) Taipei Fubon Braves	
August 25, 2025	Viktor Gaddefors	—N/a	(Poland) Twarde Pierniki Toruń	
August 25, 2025	Marko Todorović	—N/a	(Taiwan) New Taipei CTBC DEA	
August 25, 2025	Nemanja Radović	—N/a	(Spain) UCAM Murcia CB	
August 25, 2025	Pavlin Ivanov	—N/a	(Spain) CB Menorca	
August 25, 2025	Walter Lum	—N/a	(United States) Whitman	
September 17, 2025	Tseng Hsin-Wu	—N/a	(Taiwan) NTNU	
December 22, 2025	Beau Beech	—N/a	(Croatia) KK Zadar	
February 9, 2026	Nick King	—N/a	(Taiwan) Taipei Fubon Braves	

==== Subtractions ====
Date	Player	Reason	New team	Ref.
July 25, 2025	Daron Russell	Contract expired	(Romania) U-BT Cluj-Napoca	
August 25, 2025	Kristijan Krajina	Contract expired	(Croatia) KK Dubrava	
August 25, 2025	Nysier Brooks	Contract expired	(Israel) Hapoel Holon	
August 25, 2025	Ivan Aska	Contract expired	(Nicaragua) Jaguares UAM	
August 25, 2025	Liu Min-Yan	Contract expired	—N/a	
August 25, 2025	Zhou Cheng-Rui	Contract expired	(Taiwan) Changhua Pauian BLL	
August 25, 2025	Liu Jen-Hao	Contract expired	(China) Hangzhou Jingwei	
August 25, 2025	Hsu Yu-Hui	Contract expired	(Taiwan) Changhua Pauian BLL	
August 25, 2025	Lin Meng-Hsueh	Contract terminated	(Taiwan) Keelung Black Kites	
January 12, 2026	Pavlin Ivanov	Contract terminated	(Bulgaria) Spartak Pleven	

== Awards ==
=== Yearly awards ===
Recipient	Award	Ref.
Marko Todorović	Rebounds Leader	
Marko Todorović	All-Defensive Second Team	
Marko Todorović	All-TPBL First Team	
Mohammad Al Bachir Gadiaga	All-Defensive First Team	
Mohammad Al Bachir Gadiaga	All-TPBL First Team	
Hsieh Ya-Hsuan	All-Defensive Second Team	
Passion Sisters	Cheerleading Team of the Year	

=== Player of the Week ===
Week	Recipient	Award	Ref.
4	Nemanja Radović	Week 4 Player of the Week	
9	Marko Todorović	Week 9 Player of the Week	
25	Nemanja Radović	Week 25 Player of the Week	

=== Player of the Month ===
Month	Recipient	Award	Ref.
December	Hsieh Ya-Hsuan	December Player of the Month (local)	
December	Marko Todorović	December Player of the Month (import)	
March	Mohammad Al Bachir Gadiaga	March Player of the Month (local)	
April & May	Mohammad Al Bachir Gadiaga	April & May Player of the Month (local)	
