= T. J. Holyfield =

American basketball player (born 1995)

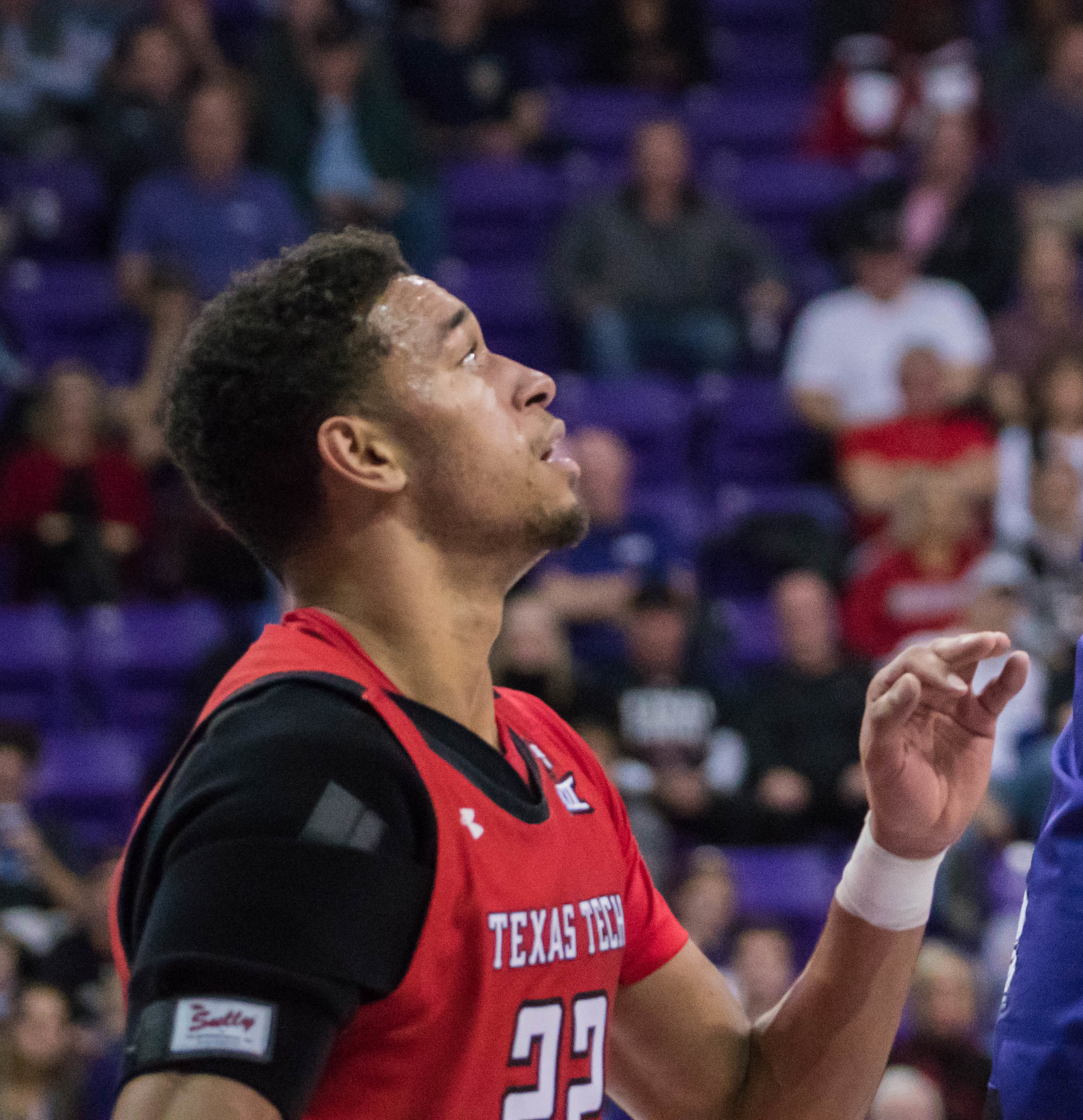

No. 32 – Hapoel Holon
- Position: Power forward
- League: Israeli Basketball Premier League

Personal information
- Born: September 22, 1995 (age 31)
- Listed height: 6 ft 8 in (2.03 m)
- Listed weight: 220 lb (100 kg)

Career information
- High school: Manzano (Albuquerque, New Mexico); Elev8 Sports Institute (Delray Beach, Florida)
- College: Stephen F. Austin (2015–2018); Texas Tech (2019–2020)
- NBA draft: 2020: undrafted
- Playing career: 2020–present

Career history
- 2020–2021: Kauhajoki Karhu
- 2021–2023: EWE Baskets Oldenburg
- 2023–2025: Yamagata Wyverns
- 2025–2026: Hsinchu Toplus Lioneers
- 2026–present: Hapoel Holon

Career highlights
- Second-team All-Southland (2017); Southland All-Defensive Team (2018)

Timothy Holyfield (born September 22, 1995) is an American professional basketball player for the Hapoel Holon of the Israeli Basketball Premier League. He played college basketball for the Stephen F. Austin Lumberjacks and the Texas Tech Red Raiders.

== Early life ==
Holyfield attended Manzano High School in Albuquerque, New Mexico. He did a postgraduate year at Elev8 Sports Institute in Florida and signed with Stephen F. Austin.

== College career ==
Holyfield, a 6-foot-8-inch (2.03 m) power forward, averaged 7.5 points, 4.2 rebounds, 1.1 assists and 1.5 blocks per game as a freshman. As a sophomore, he averaged 11.7 points and 7.2 rebounds per game. He was named to the Second Team All-Southland Conference. On November 18, 2017, he scored a career-high 25 points and had nine rebounds and five steals in a 118–64 win against Howard Payne University. Holyfield averaged 12.9 points and 6.4 rebounds per game as a junior while shooting 54.8 percent from the field. He was named to the Third Team All-Southland as well as the All-Defensive Team. Holyfield earned MVP honors of the 2018 Southland Conference men's basketball tournament. Holyfield helped the Lumberjacks reach the NCAA tournament before losing to Texas Tech 70–60 in the first round with Holyfield contributing 10 points and four rebounds. He redshirted the 2018–19 season with a shoulder injury, and spent the season giving a speech at his church, wrapping Christmas presents for under-privileged children and visiting children in Belfast.

After the season, Holyfield decided to transfer to Texas Tech, choosing the Red Raiders over Kansas, Oregon, Illinois and Miami (FL). He had 15 points and six rebounds in the season-opening victory over Eastern Illinois, followed by 20 points and had six rebounds in a win over Bethune–Cookman. Holyfield was named Big 12 newcomer of the week on November 11, 2019. As a senior, Holyfield averaged 8.9 points, 4.5 rebounds and 1.1 assists per game.

== Professional career ==
On May 20, 2020, Holyfield signed with Kauhajoki Karhu of the Finnish Korisliiga.

On June 17, 2021, he signed with EWE Baskets Oldenburg of the Basketball Bundesliga.

On July 7, 2023, Holyfield signed with Yamagata Wyverns of the Japanese B.League.

On August 22, 2025, Holyfield signed with the Hsinchu Toplus Lioneers of the Taiwan Professional Basketball League (TPBL).

On October 8, 2026, Holyfield signed with the Hapoel Holon of the Israeli Basketball Premier League.
