= Aric Holman =

American basketball player

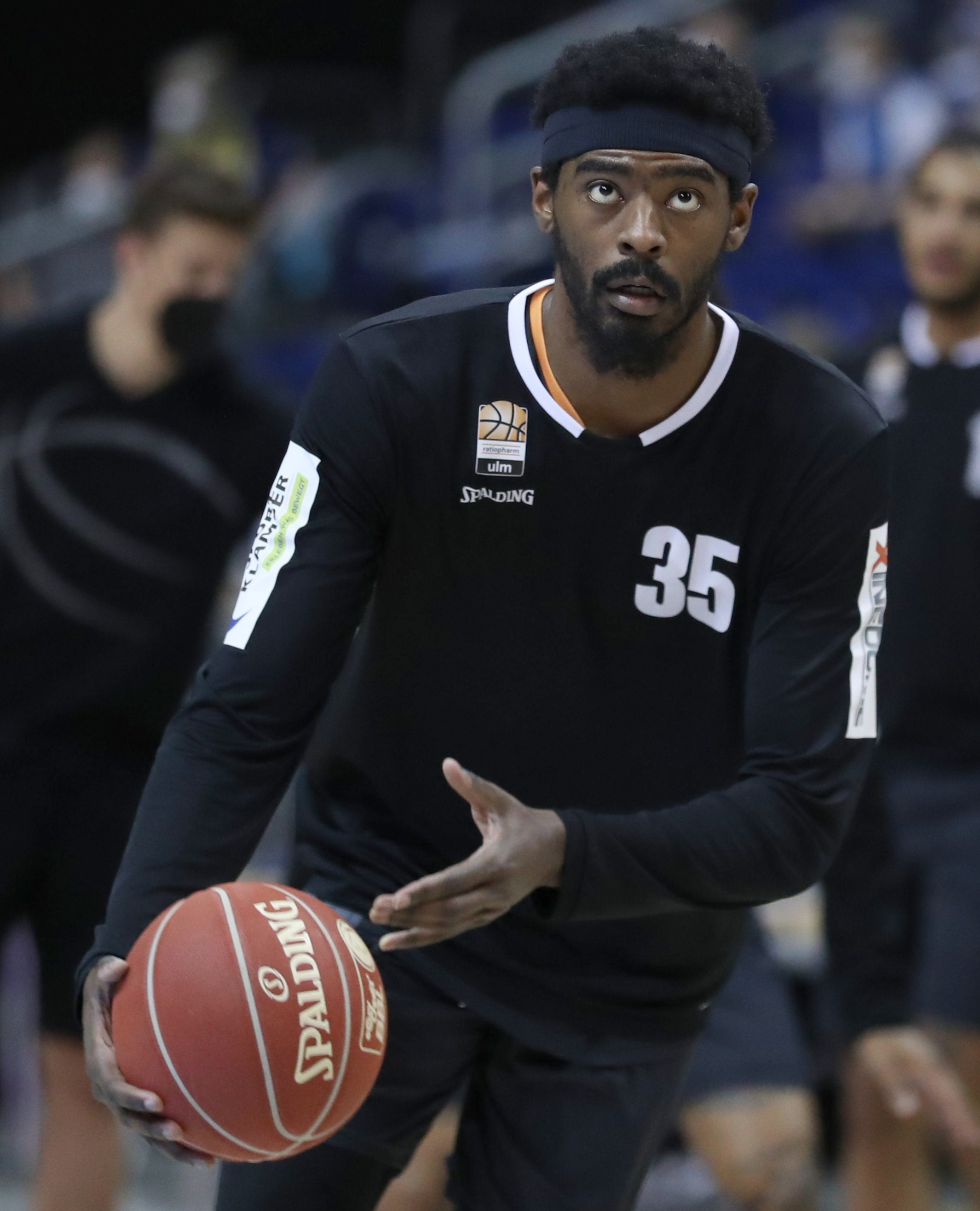

No. 35 – Formosa Dreamers
- Position: Center
- League: Taiwan Professional Basketball League

Personal information
- Born: July 11, 1997 (age 29) Owensboro, Kentucky, U.S.
- Listed height: 6 ft 10 in (2.08 m)
- Listed weight: 220 lb (100 kg)

Career information
- High school: Owensboro (Owensboro, Kentucky)
- College: Mississippi State (2015–2019)
- NBA draft: 2019: undrafted
- Playing career: 2019–present

Career history
- 2019–2020: Texas Legends
- 2020–2021: ratiopharm Ulm
- 2021–2022: Austin Spurs
- 2022: Gigantes de Carolina
- 2022–2023: Scaligera Verona
- 2023–2024: Legia Warszawa
- 2024: Al-Nasr
- 2024–present: Formosa Dreamers

Career highlights
- TPBL champion (2026); Polish Cup winner (2024); All-PLK Team (2024); Polish Cup MVP (2024); All-TPBL Second Team (2026)
- Stats at NBA.com
- Stats at Basketball Reference

Aric Jeremiah Holman (born July 11, 1997) is an American professional basketball player for the Formosa Dreamers of the Taiwan Professional Basketball League (TPBL). He played college basketball for the Mississippi State Bulldogs.

== High school career ==
Holman played basketball at Owensboro High School in Owensboro, Kentucky. He was all state and won the state championship his senior year.

== College career ==
Holman played for the Mississippi State Bulldogs men's basketball team under head coach Ben Howland from 2015 to 2019. He averaged 9.5 points, 6.2 rebounds, 1.2 assists, and 1.6 blocks per game as a senior at Mississippi State.

== Professional career ==
=== Texas Legends (2019–2020) ===
After going undrafted in the 2019 NBA draft, Holman signed with the Los Angeles Lakers in July 2019. The Lakers waived Holman in August to make space for Dwight Howard on the training camp roster, but was subsequently claimed off waivers by the Dallas Mavericks. He was waived on October 16, 2019. Holman signed with the Texas Legends. He had 18 points in a 113–107 win over the Santa Cruz Warriors on November 26. Holman averaged 9.7 points, 4.3 rebounds, and 1.4 assists per game.

=== ratiopharm Ulm (2020–2021) ===
On August 10, 2020, Homan signed with ratiopharm Ulm of the German Basketball Bundesliga.

=== Austin Spurs (2021–2022) ===
In August 2021, Holman joined the Boston Celtics for the 2021 NBA summer league, missing one shot and taking 2 rebounds in 5 minutes at his debut, an 85–83 win against the Atlanta Hawks. On October 2, 2021, he signed with the San Antonio Spurs, but was waived the same day. On October 27, he signed with the Austin Spurs as an affiliate player.

On December 29, 2021, Holman signed a 10-day contract with the Miami Heat. However, he never played a game for the team. On January 9, 2022, he was reacquired by Austin.

=== Gigantes de Carolina (2022) ===
On April 7, 2022, Holman signed with Gigantes de Carolina from Puerto Rico.

Holman joined the Houston Rockets for the 2022 NBA Summer League.

=== Scaligera Basket Verona (2022–2023) ===
On August 3, 2022, he has signed with Scaligera Verona in the Serie A.

=== Legia Warszawa (2023–2024) ===
On February 10, 2023, he signed with Legia Warszawa of the Polish Basketball League.

=== Formosa Dreamers (2024–present) ===
On August 14, 2024, Holman signed with the Formosa Dreamers of the Taiwan Professional Basketball League (TPBL).

On July 18, 2025, Holman re-signed with the Formosa Dreamers of the Taiwan Professional Basketball League (TPBL).

On May 11, 2026, Holman was selected to the All-TPBL Second Team in 2025–26 season. On July 2, Holman re-signed with the Formosa Dreamers of the Taiwan Professional Basketball League (TPBL).
