= Viktor Gaddefors =

Swedish basketball player (born 1992)

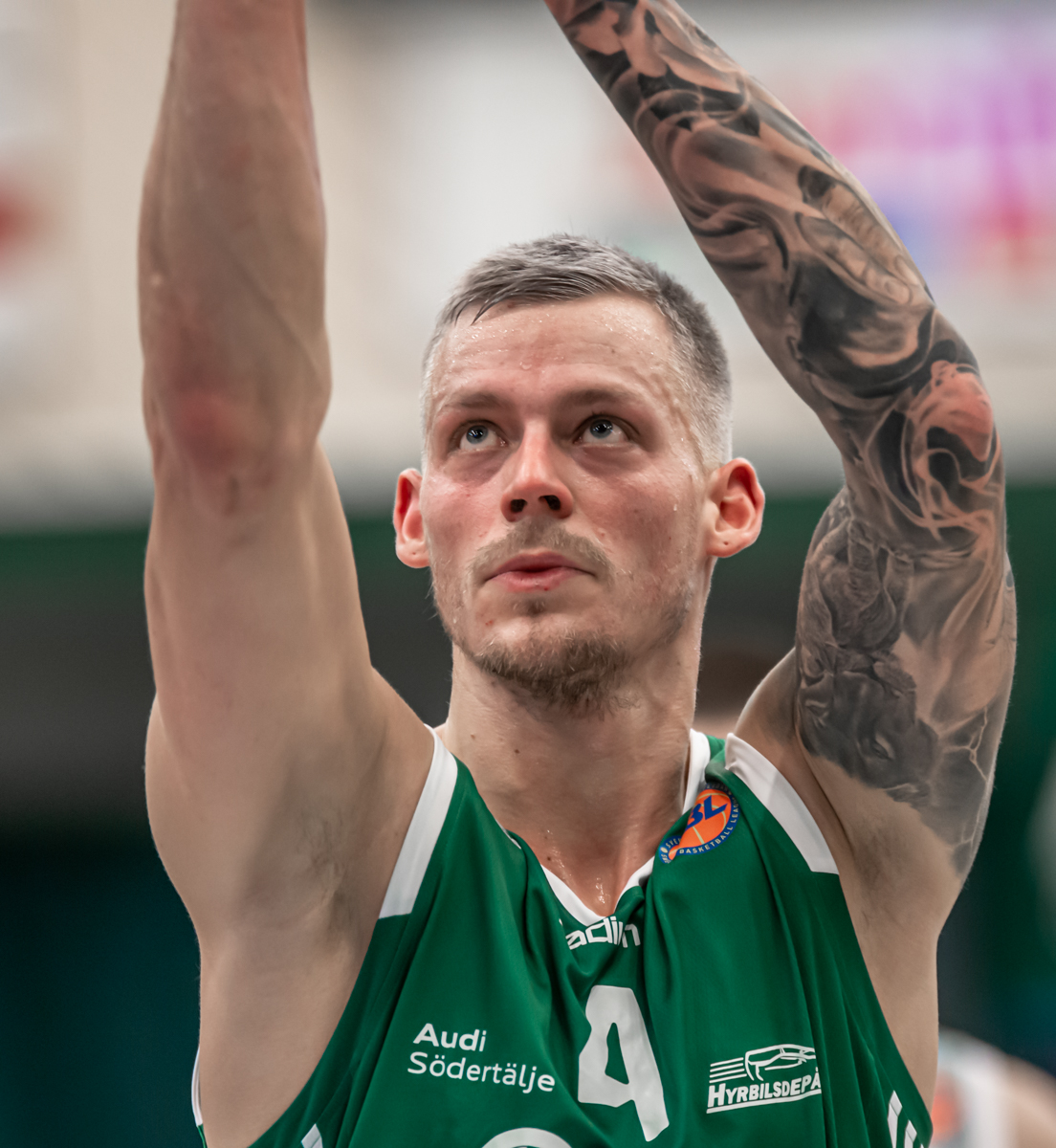
- Gaddefors playing with Södertälje in 2021

No. 18 – Twarde Pierniki Toruń
- Position: Small forward
- League: Polish Basketball League

Personal information
- Born: October 8, 1992 (age 34) Östersund, Sweden
- Listed height: 6 ft 7 in (2.01 m)
- Listed weight: 216 lb (98 kg)

Career information
- NBA draft: 2014: undrafted
- Playing career: 2008–present

Career history
- 2008–2010: Uppsala
- 2010–2011: Virtus Bologna
- 2011–2012: Sidigas Avellino
- 2012–2014: Virtus Bologna
- 2014–2015: Pallacanestro Mantovana
- 2015–2017: Juve Caserta
- 2017–2018: Uppsala
- 2018–2020: Antibes Sharks
- 2020–2021: Södertälje BBK
- 2021–2022: CS Dinamo București
- 2022–2023: Donar
- 2023–2024: New Taipei CTBC DEA
- 2024: San Giobbe
- 2024–2025: Twarde Pierniki Toruń
- 2025–2026: New Taipei CTBC DEA
- 2026–present: Twarde Pierniki Toruń

Career highlights
- SBL Most Valuable Player (2021)

Carl Viktor Gaddefors (born October 8, 1992) is a Swedish professional basketball player for the Twarde Pierniki Toruń of the Polish Basketball League.

== Professional career ==
Sidigas Avellino acquired Gaddefors in October 2011. Gaddefors played for Virtus Bologna in 2012 to 2014. He joined Pallacanestro Mantovana in October 2014. After playing for Juve Caserta, Gaddefors signed with the Antibes Sharks in March 2018 to replace the injured Paul Rigot and Max Kouguere. He averaged 7.2 points, 4.3 rebounds, 1.9 assists and 1.3 steals per game during the 2019-20 season.

Gaddefors signed with Södertälje BBK on September 25, 2020. He won the Swedish Basketball League MVP Award of the 2020–21 season. Gaddefors averaged 20.3 points, 9.8 rebounds, 2.6 assists and On September 13, 2021, he signed with CS Dinamo București of the Liga Națională.

On November 11, 2022, he signed with Donar of the BNXT League.

On July 28, 2023, Gaddefors signed with New Taipei CTBC DEA of the T1 League. On January 12, 2024, the New Taipei CTBC DEA terminated the contract relationship with Gaddefors. On January 23, 2024, Gaddefors signed with San Giobbe. On September 1, 2024, Gaddefors signed with Twarde Pierniki Toruń of the Polish Basketball League.

On August 25, 2025, Gaddefors returned to the New Taipei CTBC DEA of the Taiwan Professional Basketball League (TPBL).

On July 28, 2026, Gaddefors returned to the Twarde Pierniki Toruń of the Polish Basketball League.

== Career statistics ==
=== National team ===
| Team | Tournament | Pos. | GP | PPG | RPG | APG |
|---|---|---|---|---|---|---|
| Sweden | EuroBasket 2013 | 13th | 5 | 4.4 | 2.6 | 1.0 |
| Sweden | EuroBasket 2025 | 16th | 6 | 9.2 | 4.0 | 2.8 |
