= Malcolm Miller (basketball) =

American basketball player (born 1993)

No. 13 – Taoyuan Taiwan Beer Leopards
- Position: Small forward
- League: Taiwan Professional Basketball League

Personal information
- Born: March 6, 1993 (age 33) Laytonsville, Maryland, U.S.
- Listed height: 2.01 m (6 ft 7 in)
- Listed weight: 95 kg (209 lb)

Career information
- High school: Gaithersburg (Gaithersburg, Maryland)
- College: Holy Cross (2011–2015)
- NBA draft: 2015: undrafted
- Playing career: 2015–present

Career history
- 2015–2016: Maine Red Claws
- 2016–2017: Alba Berlin
- 2017–2020: Toronto Raptors
- 2017–2019: →Raptors 905
- 2020–2021: Salt Lake City Stars
- 2021–2022: Vanoli Cremona
- 2022: Raptors 905
- 2022: Formosa Taishin Dreamers
- 2023: Limoges CSP
- 2023–2024: Unione Cestistica Casalpusterlengo
- 2024–2025: Taipei Taishin Mars
- 2025–present: Taoyuan Taiwan Beer Leopards

Career highlights
- NBA champion (2019); Second-team All-Patriot League (2015); 2× TPBL All-Defensive Second Team (2025, 2026); Third-team All-Patriot League (2014)
- Stats at NBA.com
- Stats at Basketball Reference

Malcolm Miller (born March 6, 1993) is an American professional basketball player for Taoyuan Taiwan Beer Leopards of the Taiwan Professional Basketball League (TPBL). He played college basketball for the Holy Cross Crusaders.

Miller has played in the National Basketball Association (NBA) for the Toronto Raptors, whom he won a championship with in 2019.

== High school career ==
Miller attended Gaithersburg High School where he served as team captain during both his junior and senior seasons, averaging 13.1 points, 7.5 rebounds, 2.8 assists, 2.6 blocks and 1.4 steals per game as a senior, earning him first team All-Gazette honors.

== College career ==
In four years at Holy Cross, Miller totaled 1,013 points, 532 rebounds, 164 assists, 143 blocked shots and 93 steals, ranking third all-time in career blocked shots and sixth in career games started (93).

As a senior, Miller averaged 14.5 points, 4.9 rebounds, 1.6 blocked shots, 1.3 steals and 1.2 assists per game for the Crusaders, while connecting on 37.2 percent of his three-point field goal attempts and 83.0 percent of his free throws. He finished the season ranked second in the Patriot League in blocked shots, fourth in free throw percentage, seventh in steals, eighth in scoring, 14th in three-point field goals made and 15th in rebounding. Miller led the team in scoring 13 times and in rebounding 13 times that year, while scoring in double-figures 25 times.

== Professional career ==
=== Maine Red Claws (2015–2016) ===
After going undrafted on the 2015 NBA draft, Miller joined the Boston Celtics for the 2015 NBA Summer League where he averaged 4.0 points and 1.3 rebounds in 12.1 minutes per game. On September 25, 2015, he signed with the Celtics. However, he was later waived by the Celtics on October 20 after appearing in one preseason game. On October 31, he was acquired by the Maine Red Claws of the NBA Development League as an affiliate player of the Celtics.

=== Alba Berlin (2016–2017) ===
On July 27, 2016, Miller signed with Alba Berlin of the German Bundesliga and EuroCup.

=== Toronto Raptors (2017–2020) ===
For the 2017–18 season, Miller signed with the Toronto Raptors of the NBA as the team's first two-way contract recipient. He would spend most of the season with the Raptors' G-League affiliate Raptors 905. Miller would play in 15 NBA regular season games for the Raptors, starting four times. He made his first career NBA start on March 4, 2018, against the Charlotte Hornets.

On February 10, 2019, Miller re-signed with the Toronto Raptors as a part of the main roster. That season, Miller played in 10 playoff games and won a championship with Raptors after they defeated the Golden State Warriors in the 2019 NBA Finals.

In the 2019–20 season, Miller played in 28 games for the Raptors, starting once.

=== Salt Lake City Stars (2021) ===
On December 18, 2020, Miller signed a contract with the Utah Jazz. He was waived at the conclusion of training camp, but was later added to the roster of their G League affiliate, the Salt Lake City Stars.

=== Vanoli Cremona (2021–2022) ===
On August 29, 2021, Miller signed with Vanoli Cremona of the Italian Lega Basket Serie A (LBA). After averaging 9.3 points per game, he parted ways with the team on January 24, 2022.

=== Return to the 905 (2022–2023) ===
On December 15, 2022, Miller was traded from the Salt Lake City Stars to the Raptors 905.

=== Limoges CSP (2023) ===
On January 19, 2023, he signed with Limoges CSP of the LNB Pro A.

=== Taipei Taishin Mars (2024-2025) ===
On September 7, 2024, Miller signed with the Taipei Taishin Mars of the Taiwan Professional Basketball League (TPBL). On June 2, 2025, Miller was selected to the All-Defensive Second Team of the TPBL in 2024–25 season.

=== Taoyuan Taiwan Beer Leopards (2025-present) ===
On August 20, 2025, Miller signed with the Taoyuan Taiwan Beer Leopards of the Taiwan Professional Basketball League (TPBL).

On May 9, 2026, Miller was selected to the All-Defensive Second Team of the TPBL in 2025–26 season. On August 5, Miller re-signed with the Taoyuan Taiwan Beer Leopards of the Taiwan Professional Basketball League (TPBL).

== Career statistics ==
Legend
GP	Games played	GS	Games started	MPG	Minutes per game
FG%	Field goal percentage	3P%	3-point field goal percentage	FT%	Free throw percentage
RPG	Rebounds per game	APG	Assists per game	SPG	Steals per game
BPG	Blocks per game	PPG	Points per game	**Bold**	Career high
†	Won an NBA championship

=== NBA ===
==== Regular season ====
Year	Team	GP	GS	MPG	FG%	3P%	FT%	RPG	APG	SPG	BPG	PPG
2017–18	Toronto	15	**4**	**8.4**	**.464**	.381	**1.000**	**1.0**	.2	.1	**.1**	2.5
2018–19†	Toronto	10	0	6.7	.423	**.476**	.750	.5	.1	.1	**.1**	**3.5**
2019–20	Toronto	**28**	1	5.8	.414	.364	.375	.6	**.4**	**.2**	**.1**	1.3
Career		53	5	6.7	.434	.406	.625	.7	.3	.1	.1	2.0

==== Playoffs ====
Year	Team	GP	GS	MPG	FG%	3P%	FT%	RPG	APG	SPG	BPG	PPG
2019†	Toronto	**10**	0	2.8	.250	.167	**.750**	**.5**	**.1**	.0	**.1**	.8
2020	Toronto	1	0	**5.0**	**.333**	**1.000**	.0	.0	.0	.0	.0	**3.0**
Career		11	0	3.0	.273	.286	.750	.5	.1	.0	.1	1.0

== Personal life ==
The son of Robert and Sheila Miller, he has one brother and two sisters. His sister, Janell Thomas, played basketball at North Carolina Central. In June 2021 Miller married his longtime girlfriend, Dana, and in October 2021 they welcomed a daughter.
