= Drew Pember =

American basketball player (born 2000)

No. 2 – Hsinchu Toplus Lioneers
- Position: Power forward
- League: Taiwan Professional Basketball League

Personal information
- Born: June 14, 2000 (age 26) Knoxville, Tennessee, U.S.
- Listed height: 210 cm (6 ft 11 in)
- Listed weight: 95 kg (209 lb)

Career information
- High school: Bearden (Knoxville, Tennessee)
- College: Tennessee (2019–2021); UNC Asheville (2021–2024)
- NBA draft: 2024: undrafted
- Playing career: 2024–present

Career history
- 2025: KK Mornar Bar
- 2025–present: Hsinchu Toplus Lioneers

Career highlights
- 2× Big South Player of the Year (2023, 2024); Big South tournament MVP (2023); 2× Big South Defensive Player of the Year (2022, 2023); 3× First-team All-Big South (2022–2024); All-TPBL Second Team (2026)

Donald Andrew Pember (born June 14, 2000) is an American professional basketball player for the Hsinchu Toplus Lioneers of the Taiwan Professional Basketball League (TPBL). He played college basketball for the UNC Asheville Bulldogs and the Tennessee Volunteers.

== Early life and high school career ==
Pember grew up in Knoxville, Tennessee and attended Bearden High School. As a junior, he averaged 10 points, seven rebounds, three blocks, and 2.7 assists per game and was named All-District 4-AAA. Pember was rated a three-star recruit and committed to playing college basketball for Tennessee over offers from Davidson, Mercer, and Florida Atlantic.

== College career ==
Pember played in 22 games off the bench for the Tennessee Volunteers and averaged 1.3 points and one rebound per game. He played in 10 games and averaged 2.8 minutes played per game as a sophomore. Pember entered the NCAA transfer portal at the end of the season.

Pember ultimately transferred to UNC Asheville. He was named the Big South Conference Defensive Player of the Year and first team All-Big South after averaging 15.7 points, 6.6 rebounds, and three blocked shots per game in his first season with the Bulldogs. Pember scored a school-record with 48 points scored in an 88–80 overtime win over Presbyterian. As a senior, he averaged 21 points, 9.2 rebounds, and 2.4 blocks per game. Pember was named Big South Player of the Year and repeated as Defensive Player of the Year and first-team All-Big South at the end of the season. He was named the Most Valuable Player of the 2023 Big South Conference men's basketball tournament after scoring 29 points in the final against Campbell. Pember considered entering the 2023 NBA draft, but ultimately decided to utilize the extra year of eligibility granted to college athletes who played in the 2020 season due to the COVID-19 pandemic and return to UNC Asheville.

== Professional career ==
After going undrafted in the 2024 NBA draft, Pember was invited to join the Charlotte Hornets for NBA Summer League.

On August 26, 2025, Pember signed with the Hsinchu Toplus Lioneers of the Taiwan Professional Basketball League (TPBL).

On May 11, 2026, Pember was selected to the All-TPBL Second Team in 2025–26 season. On July 1, Pember re-signed with the Hsinchu Toplus Lioneers of the Taiwan Professional Basketball League (TPBL).

== Career statistics ==
Legend
GP	Games played	GS	Games started	MPG	Minutes per game
FG%	Field goal percentage	3P%	3-point field goal percentage	FT%	Free throw percentage
RPG	Rebounds per game	APG	Assists per game	SPG	Steals per game
BPG	Blocks per game	PPG	Points per game	**Bold**	Career high

=== College ===
Year	Team	GP	GS	MPG	FG%	3P%	FT%	RPG	APG	SPG	BPG	PPG
2019–20	Tennessee	22	0	5.5	.333	.200	.714	1.0	.2	.0	.1	1.3
2020–21	Tennessee	10	0	2.8	.111	.000	–	.3	.4	.2	.1	.2
2021–22	UNC Asheville	31	30	26.9	**.495**	.356	**.863**	6.6	1.4	.8	**3.0**	15.7
2022–23	UNC Asheville	**36**	**36**	**33.4**	.464	**.380**	.837	**9.2**	**2.3**	**.9**	2.4	**21.0**
Career		99	66	22.1	.468	.356	.842	5.7	1.4	.6	1.8	12.9

== Personal life ==
Pember's parents were both college athletes at Carson-Newman University, with his father playing basketball and his mother playing volleyball.
