= New Taipei CTBC DEA all-time roster =

The following is a list of players, both past and current, who appeared at least in one game for the New Taipei CTBC DEA (2021–present) franchise.

== Players ==
Note: Statistics are correct through the end of the 2025–26 TPBL season.

G	Guard	PG	Point guard	SG	Shooting guard	G/F	Guard-forward	F	Forward	SF	Small forward	PF	Power forward	F/C	Forward-center	C	Center

^{*}	Denotes player who has been selected for at least one All-Star Game and is currently on the New Taipei CTBC DEA roster
^{+}	Denotes player who has been selected for at least one All-Star Game with the New Taipei CTBC DEA
^{x}	Denotes player who is currently on the New Taipei CTBC DEA roster
0.0	Denotes the New Taipei CTBC DEA statistics leader (min. 40 games played for the team for per-game statistics)
player	Denotes player who has played for the New Taipei CTBC DEA in the T1

=== A ===
Player	Name	Nat.	Pos.	From	Yrs	Seasons	Statistics									Ref.
Player	Name	Nat.	Pos.	From	Yrs	Seasons	GP	MP	PTS	REB	AST	MPG	PPG	RPG	APG	Ref.
Kevin Allen	凱	(United States)	C	Emporia State	1	2021–2022	6	147:17	93	48	8	24:32	15.5	8.0	1.3	
Ivan Aska	艾斯卡	(United States Virgin Islands) (Puerto Rico)	F	Murray State	1	2024–2025	11	264:33	108	76	20	24:03	9.8	6.9	1.8	

=== B ===
Player	Name	Nat.	Pos.	From	Yrs	Seasons	Statistics									Ref.
Player	Name	Nat.	Pos.	From	Yrs	Seasons	GP	MP	PTS	REB	AST	MPG	PPG	RPG	APG	Ref.
Mohammad Al Bachir Gadiaga^{*}	阿巴西	(Taiwan)	F	SHU	5	2021–2024; 2025–present	113	4198:36	2236	626	381	37:09	19.8	5.5	3.4	
Beau Beech	貝奇	(United States)	F	North Florida	1	2025–2026	18	466:25	241	114	25	25:54	13.4	6.3	1.4	
Kaspars Bērziņš	卡斯	(Latvia)	C	Latvia	1	2022–2023	13	294:09	113	90	18	22:37	8.7	6.9	1.4	
Vladimír Brodziansky^{x}	法拉帝	(Slovakia)	PF/C	TCU	1	2026–present	0	0:00	0	0	0	0:00	0.0	0.0	0.0	
Nysier Brooks	奈森	(United States)	F	Ole Miss	1	2024–2025	22	673:31	309	237	20	30:36	14.0	10.8	0.9	

=== C ===
Player	Name	Nat.	Pos.	From	Yrs	Seasons	Statistics									Ref.
Player	Name	Nat.	Pos.	From	Yrs	Seasons	GP	MP	PTS	REB	AST	MPG	PPG	RPG	APG	Ref.
Chen Yu-An	陳鈺安	(Taiwan)	F	UT	1	2023–2024	2	4:30	0	0	0	2:15	0.0	0.0	0.0	
Demitrius Conger	康格	(United States)	SG	St. Bonaventure	1	2022–2023	7	149:39	95	50	11	21:22	13.6	7.1	1.6	

=== D ===
Player	Name	Nat.	Pos.	From	Yrs	Seasons	Statistics									Ref.
Player	Name	Nat.	Pos.	From	Yrs	Seasons	GP	MP	PTS	REB	AST	MPG	PPG	RPG	APG	Ref.
Cody Demps	柯丹	(United States)	PG	Sacramento State	1	2023–2024	13	460:17	204	75	56	35:24	15.7	5.8	4.3	

=== E ===
Player	Name	Nat.	Pos.	From	Yrs	Seasons	Statistics									Ref.
Player	Name	Nat.	Pos.	From	Yrs	Seasons	GP	MP	PTS	REB	AST	MPG	PPG	RPG	APG	Ref.
James Eads	捷翼	(United States)	G	Tuskegee	1	2024–2025	3	82:45	72	12	11	27:35	24.0	4.0	3.7	
Cleanthony Early	厄力	(United States)	SF	Wichita State	1	2021–2022	12	342:07	331	107	57	28:30	27.6	8.9	4.8	
Aaron Epps	艾斯	(United States)	PF	LSU	1	2021–2022	11	344:58	220	104	12	31:21	20.0	9.5	1.1	

=== F ===
Player	Name	Nat.	Pos.	From	Yrs	Seasons	Statistics									Ref.
Player	Name	Nat.	Pos.	From	Yrs	Seasons	GP	MP	PTS	REB	AST	MPG	PPG	RPG	APG	Ref.
Conner Frankamp	柯南	(United States) (Georgia (country))	PG	Wichita State	1	2024–2025	7	200:54	90	19	17	28:42	12.9	2.7	2.4	

=== G ===
Player	Name	Nat.	Pos.	From	Yrs	Seasons	Statistics									Ref.
Player	Name	Nat.	Pos.	From	Yrs	Seasons	GP	MP	PTS	REB	AST	MPG	PPG	RPG	APG	Ref.
Viktor Gaddefors	飛克	(Sweden)	F	Sweden	2	2023–2024; 2025–2026	42	1397:11	624	400	148	33:15	14.9	9.5	3.5	
Chevez Goodwin	浩勝	(United States)	C	USC	1	2024–2025	3	88:36	53	49	5	29:32	17.7	16.3	1.7	
Bryan Griffin	葛瑞飛	(United States)	PF	Xavier	1	2024–2025	7	211:51	97	78	5	30:15	13.9	11.1	0.7	
Jure Gunjina	朱利	(Croatia)	PF	Georgia Southwestern	1	2022–2023	7	120:08	30	16	13	17:09	4.3	2.3	1.9	

=== H ===
Player	Name	Nat.	Pos.	From	Yrs	Seasons	Statistics									Ref.
Player	Name	Nat.	Pos.	From	Yrs	Seasons	GP	MP	PTS	REB	AST	MPG	PPG	RPG	APG	Ref.
Hsieh Ya-Hsuan^{*}	謝亞軒	(Taiwan)	G	UCH	6	2021–present	153	4847:16	1756	554	548	31:40	11.5	3.6	3.6	
Hsu Yu-Hui	徐宇煇	(Taiwan)	G	NTSU	1	2024–2025	1	1:37	0	0	0	1:37	0.0	0.0	0.0	
Huang Hung-Han^{x}	黃泓瀚	(Taiwan)	F	UCH	4	2023–present	94	1582:22	305	266	117	16:50	3.2	2.8	1.2	

=== I ===
Player	Name	Nat.	Pos.	From	Yrs	Seasons	Statistics									Ref.
Player	Name	Nat.	Pos.	From	Yrs	Seasons	GP	MP	PTS	REB	AST	MPG	PPG	RPG	APG	Ref.
Prince Ibeh	伊布	(United Kingdom) (Rwanda)	C	Texas	1	2021–2022	15	368:38	119	112	13	24:34	7.9	7.5	0.9	
Pavlin Ivanov	霸夫	(Bulgaria)	G	Bulgaria	1	2025–2026	3	69:17	27	17	5	23:05	9.0	5.7	1.7	

=== J ===
Player	Name	Nat.	Pos.	From	Yrs	Seasons	Statistics									Ref.
Player	Name	Nat.	Pos.	From	Yrs	Seasons	GP	MP	PTS	REB	AST	MPG	PPG	RPG	APG	Ref.
Chanatip Jakrawan	查拉帝	(Thailand)	PF	Kasetsart	1	2021–2022	20	467:40	110	99	20	23:23	5.5	5.0	1.0	
Jian Ting-Jhao^{x}	簡廷兆	(Taiwan)	G	UCH	2	2025–present	36	573:34	189	36	41	15:55	5.3	1.0	1.1	
Marlon Johnson	馬龍	(United States)	C	New Mexico Highlands	1	2021–2022	30	1114:32	542	341	98	37:09	18.1	11.4	3.3	
Marvin Jones^{x}	強斯	(United States)	PF/C	Texas Southern	1	2026–present	0	0:00	0	0	0	0:00	0.0	0.0	0.0	

=== K ===
Player	Name	Nat.	Pos.	From	Yrs	Seasons	Statistics									Ref.
Player	Name	Nat.	Pos.	From	Yrs	Seasons	GP	MP	PTS	REB	AST	MPG	PPG	RPG	APG	Ref.
Nick King	金恩	(United States)	F	Middle Tennessee	2	2022–2023; 2025–2026	18	586:46	444	134	76	32:35	24.7	7.4	4.2	
Kristijan Krajina^{+}	克力斯	(Croatia)	C	Mount St. Mary's	3	2022–2025	67	2178:34	1013	659	144	32:30	15.1	9.8	2.1	

=== L ===
Player	Name	Nat.	Pos.	From	Yrs	Seasons	Statistics									Ref.
Player	Name	Nat.	Pos.	From	Yrs	Seasons	GP	MP	PTS	REB	AST	MPG	PPG	RPG	APG	Ref.
Tyran De Lattibeaudiere	泰龍	(Jamaica)	SF	Lamar	1	2023–2024	3	68:59	45	21	5	22:59	15.0	7.0	1.7	
Lee Hsueh-Lin	李學林	(Taiwan)	PG	TPEC	2	2021–2023	9	82:29	4	8	8	9:09	0.4	0.9	0.9	
Li Pei-Cheng^{x}	李沛澄	(Taiwan)	G	FJU	4	2023–present	52	327:16	71	16	13	6:17	1.4	0.3	0.3	
Li Ruei-Ci^{x}	李睿麒	(Taiwan)	F	TSU	3	2024–present	37	354:38	135	49	5	9:35	3.6	1.3	0.1	
Lin Jen-Hung^{x}	林任鴻	(Taiwan)	F	NTNU	2	2025–present	28	182:15	32	23	8	6:30	1.1	0.8	0.3	
Lin Meng-Hsueh	林孟學	(Taiwan)	F	NTSU	1	2024–2025	2	4:38	0	2	0	2:19	0.0	1.0	0.0	
Lin Ping-Sheng^{+}	林秉聖	(Taiwan)	SG	CCU	2	2021–2023	54	1548:19	551	195	164	28:40	10.2	3.6	3.0	
Lin Wei-Han^{*}	林韋翰	(Taiwan)	G	FJU	6	2021–present	80	2404:35	693	245	499	30:03	8.7	3.1	6.2	
Liu Jen-Hao	劉人豪	(Taiwan)	PG	UCH	3	2022–2025	34	322:59	61	31	24	9:29	1.8	0.9	0.7	
Liu Min-Yan	劉旻諺	(Taiwan)	F	NKNU	4	2021–2025	11	26:02	18	5	3	2:22	1.6	0.5	0.3	
Liu Weir-Chern	劉韋辰	(Taiwan)	SF	MDU	3	2021–2024	35	254:17	62	30	7	7:15	1.8	0.9	0.2	
Lu Chi-Erh	呂濟而	(Taiwan)	PG	NKNU	1	2021–2022	21	539:42	137	85	27	25:42	6.5	4.0	1.3	
Walter Lum^{x}	林安龍	(United States) (Taiwan)	G	Whitman	2	2025–present	7	13:07	5	2	1	1:52	0.7	0.3	0.1	

=== M ===
Player	Name	Nat.	Pos.	From	Yrs	Seasons	Statistics									Ref.
Player	Name	Nat.	Pos.	From	Yrs	Seasons	GP	MP	PTS	REB	AST	MPG	PPG	RPG	APG	Ref.
Ma Yo-Cheng^{x}	馬友程	(Taiwan)	G	UT	1	2026–present	0	0:00	0	0	0	0:00	0.0	0.0	0.0	
Tevin Mack	德芬	(United States)	F	Clemson	1	2024–2025	7	259:49	151	69	17	37:07	21.6	9.9	2.4	
Jonah Morrison	譚傑龍	(Taiwan) (United Kingdom)	PF	UBC	4	2021–2025	68	810:34	189	120	57	11:55	2.8	1.8	0.8	
Clay Mounce^{x}	猛士	(United States)	PF	Furman	1	2026–present	0	0:00	0	0	0	0:00	0.0	0.0	0.0	

=== N ===
Player	Name	Nat.	Pos.	From	Yrs	Seasons	Statistics									Ref.
Player	Name	Nat.	Pos.	From	Yrs	Seasons	GP	MP	PTS	REB	AST	MPG	PPG	RPG	APG	Ref.
Nemanja Nenadić^{x}	奈迪	(Serbia)	SG/SF	Serbia	1	2026–present	0	0:00	0	0	0	0:00	0.0	0.0	0.0	

=== R ===
Player	Name	Nat.	Pos.	From	Yrs	Seasons	Statistics									Ref.
Player	Name	Nat.	Pos.	From	Yrs	Seasons	GP	MP	PTS	REB	AST	MPG	PPG	RPG	APG	Ref.
Nemanja Radović	內馬	(Montenegro)	F	Montenegro	1	2025–2026	28	875:10	554	264	48	31:15	19.8	9.4	1.7	
Daron Russell	飛馳	(United States)	G	Maryland	1	2024–2025	12	421:15	308	68	67	35:06	25.7	5.7	5.6	

=== S ===
Player	Name	Nat.	Pos.	From	Yrs	Seasons	Statistics									Ref.
Player	Name	Nat.	Pos.	From	Yrs	Seasons	GP	MP	PTS	REB	AST	MPG	PPG	RPG	APG	Ref.
Avery Scharer	夏樂	(Philippines) (United States)	PG	Shoreline CC	1	2021–2022	9	256:42	132	51	61	28:31	14.7	5.7	6.8	
Shih Chin-Yao	施晉堯	(Taiwan)	SG	CCU	1	2024–2025	36	859:19	221	112	59	23:52	6.1	3.1	1.6	

=== T ===
Player	Name	Nat.	Pos.	From	Yrs	Seasons	Statistics									Ref.
Player	Name	Nat.	Pos.	From	Yrs	Seasons	GP	MP	PTS	REB	AST	MPG	PPG	RPG	APG	Ref.
Raynere Thornton	銳尼	(United States)	F	Memphis	1	2024–2025	6	226:03	71	72	13	37:40	11.8	12.0	2.2	
Marko Todorović	馬可	(Montenegro)	F	Montenegro	2	2024–2026	32	1103:49	712	434	78	34:29	22.3	13.6	2.4	
Tseng Hsin-Wu^{x}	曾信武	(Taiwan)	F	NTNU	2	2025–present	5	19:19	6	2	0	3:51	1.2	0.4	0.0	
Tseng Wen-Ting^{*}	曾文鼎	(Taiwan)	C	TPEC	5	2022–present	111	2026:13	385	295	224	18:15	3.5	2.7	2.0	
Tung Fang Yi-Kang	東方譯慷	(Taiwan)	SG	NYCU	2	2021–2023	8	59:07	28	17	0	7:23	3.5	2.1	0.0	

=== W ===
Player	Name	Nat.	Pos.	From	Yrs	Seasons	Statistics									Ref.
Player	Name	Nat.	Pos.	From	Yrs	Seasons	GP	MP	PTS	REB	AST	MPG	PPG	RPG	APG	Ref.
Wei Chia-Hao^{x}	魏嘉豪	(Taiwan)	G	FJU	6	2021–present	143	2464:26	545	253	330	17:14	3.8	1.8	2.3	

=== Y ===
Player	Name	Nat.	Pos.	From	Yrs	Seasons	Statistics									Ref.
Player	Name	Nat.	Pos.	From	Yrs	Seasons	GP	MP	PTS	REB	AST	MPG	PPG	RPG	APG	Ref.
Yu Wei-Hao^{x}	余維豪	(Taiwan)	G	NTUA	2	2024–present	18	156:06	37	16	10	8:40	2.1	0.9	0.6	

=== Z ===
Player	Name	Nat.	Pos.	From	Yrs	Seasons	Statistics									Ref.
Player	Name	Nat.	Pos.	From	Yrs	Seasons	GP	MP	PTS	REB	AST	MPG	PPG	RPG	APG	Ref.
Dragan Zeković	傑卡	(Montenegro) (Serbia)	C	Serbia	1	2023–2024	20	488:28	268	132	21	24:25	13.4	6.6	1.1	
Edgaras Želionis^{+}	艾德	(Lithuania)	C	Lithuania	2	2022–2024	37	1118:32	691	367	74	30:13	18.7	9.9	2.0	
Zhou Cheng-Rui	周承睿	(Taiwan)	PF	CCU	4	2021–2025	17	63:09	16	12	1	3:42	0.9	0.7	0.1	
