= 2024–25 New Taipei CTBC DEA season =

Taiwanese professional basketball season

- President: Chen Kuo-En
- General Manager: Liu Chih-Wei
- Head Coach: Lee Yi-Hua
- Arena: Xinzhuang Gymnasium

TPBL results
- Record: 16–20 (44.4%)
- Place: 6th
- Playoffs finish: Did not qualify

Player records
- Points: Kristijan Krajina 14.5
- Rebounds: Nysier Brooks 10.8
- Assists: Hsieh Ya-Hsuan 3.8

The 2024–25 New Taipei CTBC DEA season was the franchise's fourth season, its first season in the Taiwan Professional Basketball League (TPBL).

The DEA were coached by Lee Yi-Hua in his fourth year as their head coach.

== Draft ==
Round	Pick	Player	Position(s)	School / club team
1	5	Yu Wei-Hao	Guard	NTUA
2	10	Chen Kuan-Chung	Guard	NTSU
3	11	Tseng Ming-Wei	Center	ISU

- Reference：

On August 12, 2024, the New Taipei CTBC DEA announced that the second rounder, Chen Kuan-Chung, had joined the Jilin Northeast Tigers of the Chinese Basketball Association. And the third rounder, Tseng Ming-Wei, would not join the team due to personal reasons.

== Roster ==
2024–25 New Taipei CTBC DEA roster
Players
Coaches

Pos.	No.	Nat.	Name	Ht.	Wt.	Age	From
F	1	(Taiwan)	Li Ruei-Ci	1.93 m (6 ft 4 in)	87 kg (192 lb)	32 – 7 January 1993	TSU
PG	2	(Taiwan)	Liu Jen-Hao	1.75 m (5 ft 9 in)	70 kg (154 lb)	29 – 10 November 1995	UCH
G	3	(United States)	Daron Russell (I)	1.80 m (5 ft 11 in)	75 kg (165 lb)	27 – 6 May 1998	Maryland
F	4	(Taiwan)	Liu Min-Yan	1.95 m (6 ft 5 in)	85 kg (187 lb)	25 – 4 December 1999	NKNU
PG	7	(Taiwan)	Wei Chia-Hao	1.82 m (6 ft 0 in)	78 kg (172 lb)	25 – 13 January 2000	FJU
C	9	(Croatia)	Kristijan Krajina (I)	2.08 m (6 ft 10 in)	111 kg (245 lb)	34 – 28 December 1990	Mount St. Mary's
SG	10	(Taiwan)	Hsieh Ya-Hsuan	1.87 m (6 ft 2 in)	81 kg (179 lb)	26 – 30 October 1998	UCH
PF	11	(Taiwan)	Zhou Cheng-Rui	1.93 m (6 ft 4 in)	82 kg (181 lb)	25 – 24 February 2000	CCU
PG	16	(Taiwan)	Lin Wei-Han (C)	1.80 m (5 ft 11 in)	71 kg (157 lb)	34 – 9 July 1990	FJU
F	22	(Taiwan)	Huang Hung-Han	1.92 m (6 ft 4 in)	92 kg (203 lb)	30 – 15 October 1994	UCH
SG	28	(Taiwan)	Shih Chin-Yao	1.88 m (6 ft 2 in)	86 kg (190 lb)	34 – 28 October 1990	CCU
G	34	(Taiwan)	Hsu Yu-Hui	1.82 m (6 ft 0 in)	93 kg (205 lb)	23 – 13 October 2001	NTSU
F	37	(Taiwan)	Lin Meng-Hsueh	1.95 m (6 ft 5 in)	88 kg (194 lb)	32 – 14 October 1992	NTSU
F	42	(United States Virgin Islands) (Puerto Rico)	Ivan Aska (I)	2.01 m (6 ft 7 in)	104 kg (229 lb)	34 – 26 June 1990	Murray State
F	55	(United States)	Nysier Brooks (I)	2.13 m (7 ft 0 in)	111 kg (245 lb)	28 – 5 December 1996	Ole Miss
C	76	(Taiwan)	Tseng Wen-Ting	2.04 m (6 ft 8 in)	98 kg (216 lb)	40 – 6 July 1984	TPEC
G	77	(Taiwan)	Li Pei-Cheng	1.81 m (5 ft 11 in)	79 kg (174 lb)	24 – 25 October 2000	FJU

Head coach

- (Taiwan) Lee Yi-Hua

Assistant coach(es)

- (Serbia) Momir Ratković

Strength & conditioning coach(es)

- (Taiwan) Mu Chien-Hung

Athletic trainer(s)

- (Taiwan) Fan Hsiang-Yu
- (Taiwan) Li Kuo-Yi

Team manager

- (Taiwan) Liu Chih-Wei

Legend

- (C) Team captain
- (I) Import player
- Injured

- Roster
Updated: May 10, 2025

== Summer League ==
Hsu Yu-Hui joined to the team as the testing players in these summer league games.

=== Game log ===
Recap

August 22, 2024
14:00 (UTC+8)

Hsinchu Toplus Lioneers	79–68	New Taipei CTBC DEA

CTBC administration building basketball court, Taipei City

Recap

August 24, 2024
14:00 (UTC+8)

New Taipei CTBC DEA	78–87	Taipei Taishin Mars

CTBC administration building basketball court, Taipei City

Recap

August 27, 2024
14:00 (UTC+8)

Taipei Taishin Mars	83–81	New Taipei CTBC DEA

CTBC administration building basketball court, Taipei City

Recap

September 3, 2024
14:00 (UTC+8)

Taoyuan Taiwan Beer Leopards	64–91	New Taipei CTBC DEA

CTBC administration building basketball court, Taipei City

Recap

September 10, 2024
14:00 (UTC+8)

New Taipei CTBC DEA	75–79	Taoyuan Taiwan Beer Leopards

CTBC administration building basketball court, Taipei City

Recap

September 13, 2024
14:00 (UTC+8)

New Taipei CTBC DEA	75–79	Kaohsiung Aquas

CTBC administration building basketball court, Taipei City

== Lioneers Masters Game ==
Hsu Yu-Hui joined to the team in Lioneers Masters Game.

=== Game log ===
Recap

August 31, 2024
14:00 (UTC+8)

New Taipei CTBC DEA	76–101	Taipei Taishin Mars

Hsinchu County Stadium, Hsinchu County

Recap

September 1, 2024
14:00 (UTC+8)

Levanga Hokkaido	72–61	New Taipei CTBC DEA

Hsinchu County Stadium, Hsinchu County

== International friendship match ==
=== Game log ===
September 16, 2024
14:00 (UTC+8)

Goyang Sono Skygunners	95–92	New Taipei CTBC DEA

CTBC administration building basketball court, Taipei City

September 19, 2024
14:00 (UTC+8)

Suwon KT Sonicboom	78–84	New Taipei CTBC DEA

CTBC administration building basketball court, Taipei City

== Preseason ==
=== Game log ===
2024 preseason game log
Total: 1–1 (home: 0–0; road: 1–1)
Preseason : 1–1 (home: 0–0; road: 1–1)

Game	Date	Team	Score	High points	High rebounds	High assists	Location Attendance	Record
1	October 5	@ Dreamers	L 94–107	Shih Chin-Yao (17)	Bryan Griffin (8)	Wei Chia-Hao (5); James Eads (5)	Taichung Intercontinental Basketball Stadium; 2,100	0–1
2	October 13	@ Kings	W 85–77	Bryan Griffin (24)	Bryan Griffin (15)	Raynere Thornton (9)	Hsinchu County Stadium; 3,668	1–1

Color： Win Lose
Schedule

== Regular season ==
=== Standings ===
Pos	Team	Pld	W	L	PCT	GB	Qualification
1	New Taipei Kings	36	26	10	.722	—	Advance to semifinals
2	Formosa Dreamers	36	21	15	.583	5	Advance to semifinals
3	Kaohsiung Aquas	36	19	17	.528	7	Advance to semifinals
4	Taipei Taishin Mars	36	16	20	.444	10	Advance to play-in
5	Taoyuan Taiwan Beer Leopards	36	16	20	.444	10	Advance to play-in
6	New Taipei CTBC DEA	36	16	20	.444	10	
7	Hsinchu Toplus Lioneers	36	12	24	.333	14	

Source: TPBL

=== Game log ===
2024–25 regular season game log
Total: 16–20 (home: 8–10; road: 8–10)
October : 1–1 (home: 0–0; road: 1–1)

Game	Date	Team	Score	High points	High rebounds	High assists	Location Attendance	Record
1	October 19	@ Dreamers	L 74–88	Shih Chin-Yao (16); Chevez Goodwin (16)	Raynere Thornton (17)	Raynere Thornton (3); Liu Jen-Hao (3); Tseng Wen-Ting (3)	Taichung Intercontinental Basketball Stadium; 3,000	0–1
2	October 27	@ Kings	W 99–98	Bryan Griffin (26)	Bryan Griffin (15)	Hsieh Ya-Hsuan (5)	Xinzhuang Gymnasium; 3,568	1–1

November : 2–2 (home: 2–2; road: 0–0)

Game	Date	Team	Score	High points	High rebounds	High assists	Location Attendance	Record
3	November 2	Aquas	W 107–97	James Eads (28)	Chevez Goodwin (16)	James Eads (6)	Xinzhuang Gymnasium; 4,979	2–1
4	November 3	Dreamers	L 82–89	James Eads (19)	Chevez Goodwin (17)	Wei Chia-Hao (3); Hsieh Ya-Hsuan (3)	Xinzhuang Gymnasium; 5,341	2–2
5	November 27	Kings	L 61–79	Conner Frankamp (15)	Bryan Griffin (16)	Huang Hung-Han (4); Wei Chia-Hao (4)	Xinzhuang Gymnasium; 3,756	2–3
6	November 30	Lioneers	W 85–84	Bryan Griffin (17); Kristijan Krajina (17)	Huang Hung-Han (9); Bryan Griffin (9)	Tseng Wen-Ting (8)	Xinzhuang Gymnasium; 5,195	3–3

December : 2–5 (home: 0–3; road: 2–2)

Game	Date	Team	Score	High points	High rebounds	High assists	Location Attendance	Record
7	December 1	Mars	L 76–85	Kristijan Krajina (21)	Raynere Thornton (13)	Shih Chin-Yao (6)	Xinzhuang Gymnasium; 3,441	3–4
8	December 7	@ Leopards	W 87–86 (OT)	Kristijan Krajina (22)	Kristijan Krajina (14)	Hsieh Ya-Hsuan (5); Conner Frankamp (5)	Taoyuan Arena; 5,041	4–4
9	December 11	@ Dreamers	L 80–92	Kristijan Krajina (19)	Raynere Thornton (14)	Hsieh Ya-Hsuan (5); Kristijan Krajina (5); Shih Chin-Yao (5)	Taichung Intercontinental Basketball Stadium; 2,383	4–5
10	December 14	@ Mars	L 91–98	Hsieh Ya-Hsuan (32)	Raynere Thornton (10)	Wei Chia-Hao (5)	Taipei Heping Basketball Gymnasium; 4,027	4–6
11	December 21	Lioneers	L 78–93	Nysier Brooks (25)	Nysier Brooks (15)	Hsieh Ya-Hsuan (8)	Xinzhuang Gymnasium; 3,785	4–7
12	December 22	Leopards	L 70–88	Conner Frankamp (19)	Nysier Brooks (12)	Hsieh Ya-Hsuan (5)	Xinzhuang Gymnasium; 3,814	4–8
13	December 28	@ Lioneers	W 97–91	Nysier Brooks (29)	Nysier Brooks (19)	Wei Chia-Hao (10)	Hsinchu County Stadium; 4,181	5–8

January : 2–3 (home: 0–0; road: 2–3)

Game	Date	Team	Score	High points	High rebounds	High assists	Location Attendance	Record
14	January 1	@ Kings	L 79–96	Nysier Brooks (16); Tevin Mack (16)	Nysier Brooks (15)	Hsieh Ya-Hsuan (6); Kristijan Krajina (6)	Xinzhuang Gymnasium; 5,326	5–9
15	January 5	@ Lioneers	W 83–75	Tevin Mack (23)	Kristijan Krajina (11)	Hsieh Ya-Hsuan (7)	Hsinchu County Stadium; 3,447	6–9
16	January 8	@ Mars	L 85–89 (OT)	Tevin Mack (30)	Tevin Mack (14)	Tevin Mack (6)	Taipei Heping Basketball Gymnasium; 2,246	6–10
17	January 11	@ Aquas	W 88–72	Tevin Mack (25)	Nysier Brooks (18)	Hsieh Ya-Hsuan (11)	Kaohsiung Arena; 2,856	7–10
18	@ January 19	@ Aquas	L 91–104	Tevin Mack (22)	Nysier Brooks (10)	Wei Chia-Hao (4); Hsieh Ya-Hsuan (4); Lin Wei-Han (4); Shih Chin-Yao (4)	Kaohsiung Arena; 4,608	7–11

February : 1–1 (home: 1–0; road: 0–1)

Game	Date	Team	Score	High points	High rebounds	High assists	Location Attendance	Record
19	February 7	@ Mars	L 69–72	Ivan Aska (19)	Ivan Aska (15)	Wei Chia-Hao (4); Ivan Aska (4)	Taipei Heping Basketball Gymnasium; 4,866	7–12
20	February 28	Aquas	W 85–79	Daron Russell (31)	Marko Todorović (13)	Daron Russell (8)	Xinzhuang Gymnasium; 4,016	8–12

March : 5–2 (home: 3–2; road: 2–0)

Game	Date	Team	Score	High points	High rebounds	High assists	Location Attendance	Record
21	March 2	@ Leopards	W 116–106	Daron Russell (37)	Marko Todorović (17)	Daron Russell (9)	Taoyuan Arena; 5,019	9–12
22	March 8	Leopards	W 93–89	Daron Russell (18)	Marko Todorović (20)	Hsieh Ya-Hsuan (6); Daron Russell (6)	Xinzhuang Gymnasium; 3,481	10–12
23	March 9	Mars	W 105–82	Daron Russell (40)	Marko Todorović (22)	Daron Russell (6)	Xinzhuang Gymnasium; 2,935	11–12
24	March 15	@ Dreamers	W 98–75	Marko Todorović (24)	Nysier Brooks (14)	Daron Russell (7)	Taichung Intercontinental Basketball Stadium; 2,592	12–12
25	March 26	Aquas	L 78–87	Nysier Brooks (19)	Ivan Aska (10)	Wei Chia-Hao (4); Hsieh Ya-Hsuan (4); Ivan Aska (4)	Xinzhuang Gymnasium; 2,933	12–13
26	March 29	Dreamers	W 88–81	Hsieh Ya-Hsuan (24)	Kristijan Krajina (9)	Hsieh Ya-Hsuan (6)	Xinzhuang Gymnasium; 4,047	13–13
27	March 30	Kings	L 98–100	Ivan Aska (21); Kristijan Krajina (21)	Nysier Brooks (13)	Lin Wei-Han (11)	Xinzhuang Gymnasium; 6,068	13–14

April : 2–4 (home: 1–2; road: 1–2)

Game	Date	Team	Score	High points	High rebounds	High assists	Location Attendance	Record
28	April 6	@ Lioneers	W 97–91	Kristijan Krajina (28)	Kristijan Krajina (13)	Tseng Wen-Ting (4)	Hsinchu County Stadium; 3,547	14–14
29	April 19	Dreamers	L 95–113	Daron Russell (37)	Kristijan Krajina (16)	Wei Chia-Hao (4); Daron Russell (4)	Xinzhuang Gymnasium; 4,403	14–15
30	April 20	Kings	L 79–111	Daron Russell (28)	Nysier Brooks (12)	Lin Wei-Han (4)	Xinzhuang Gymnasium; 6,043	14–16
31	April 25	Lioneers	W 103–101 (OT)	Nysier Brooks (23)	Kristijan Krajina (21)	Lin Wei-Han (8)	Xinzhuang Gymnasium; 3,174	15–16
32	April 27	@ Aquas	L 80–91 (OT)	Kristijan Krajina (19)	Kristijan Krajina (18)	Wei Chia-Hao (6)	Kaohsiung Arena; 5,015	15–17
33	April 29	@ Leopards	L 77–85	Daron Russell (17)	Nysier Brooks (10)	Lin Wei-Han (8); Daron Russell (8)	Taoyuan Arena; 3,064	15–18

May : 1–2 (home: 1–1; road: 0–1)

Game	Date	Team	Score	High points	High rebounds	High assists	Location Attendance	Record
34	May 3	@ Kings	L 76–121	Hsieh Ya-Hsuan (18)	Kristijan Krajina (16)	Wei Chia-Hao (5)	Xinzhuang Gymnasium; 5,038	15–19
—	May 4	@ Kings	Rescheduled to May 3					
35	May 10	Leopards	L 76–95	Daron Russell (31)	Kristijan Krajina (12)	Hsieh Ya-Hsuan (5)	Xinzhuang Gymnasium; 3,965	15–20
36	May 11	Mars	W 96–89	Daron Russell (21)	Kristijan Krajina (15)	Daron Russell (10)	Xinzhuang Gymnasium; 4,054	16–20

Color： Win Lose Rescheduled
Schedule

=== Regular season note ===
- Due to the 2025 Basketball Champions League Asia – East, the TPBL declared that the game on May 4 would be rescheduled to May 3.

== Player statistics ==
Legend
GP	Games played	MPG	Minutes per game	FG%	Field goal percentage
3P%	3-point field goal percentage	FT%	Free throw percentage	RPG	Rebounds per game
APG	Assists per game	SPG	Steals per game	BPG	Blocks per game
PPG	Points per game		Led the league

=== Regular season ===
Player	GP	MPG	PPG	FG%	3P%	FT%	RPG	APG	SPG	BPG
Li Ruei-Ci	32	10:17	3.8	40.7%	28.1%	68.0%	1.3	0.2	0.2	0.0
Liu Jen-Hao	10	8:26	1.1	25.0%	20.0%	50.0%	0.9	0.8	0.7	0.1
Chevez Goodwin^{‡}	3	29:32	17.7	42.6%	0.0%	46.7%	16.3	1.7	1.0	0.7
Daron Russell^{≠}	12	35:06	25.7	35.8%	29.3%	69.5%	5.7	5.6	1.4	0.1
Liu Min-Yan	2	1:31	0.0	0.0%	0.0%	0.0%	0.5	0.0	0.5	0.0
Yu Wei-Hao	9	11:11	2.4	34.6%	22.2%	100.0%	1.1	0.9	0.4	0.0
Raynere Thornton^{‡}	6	37:40	11.8	36.2%	32.0%	68.4%	12.0	2.2	1.5	0.3
Wei Chia-Hao	35	24:53	6.3	35.6%	26.9%	38.7%	2.9	3.0	1.9	0.1
Tevin Mack^{≠‡}	7	37:07	21.6	35.6%	23.8%	48.1%	9.9	2.4	1.0	1.1
Kristijan Krajina	25	31:11	14.5	53.2%	26.7%	59.1%	10.1	2.2	1.0	0.6
Hsieh Ya-Hsuan	36	35:41	12.0	35.4%	31.9%	72.7%	4.4	3.8	1.8	0.3
Zhou Cheng-Rui	2	1:31	1.0	25.0%	0.0%	0.0%	0.5	0.0	0.0	0.5
Jonah Morrison^{‡}	3	2:27	0.0	0.0%	0.0%	0.0%	0.3	0.3	0.0	0.0
James Eads^{‡}	3	27:35	24.0	51.1%	50.0%	63.6%	4.0	3.7	1.0	0.3
Lin Wei-Han	19	27:03	6.4	26.9%	24.1%	61.5%	1.8	4.1	1.2	0.1
Marko Todorović^{≠‡}	5	35:08	23.6	54.5%	38.5%	77.4%	16.0	1.2	0.8	1.4
Huang Hung-Han	34	17:01	3.1	30.7%	20.6%	47.1%	3.1	1.3	0.9	0.4
Bryan Griffin^{‡}	7	30:15	13.9	42.4%	20.0%	65.2%	11.1	0.7	0.9	0.7
Shih Chin-Yao	36	23:52	6.1	35.0%	23.9%	59.5%	3.1	1.6	0.9	0.1
Conner Frankamp^{≠‡}	7	28:42	12.9	35.6%	25.0%	85.0%	2.7	2.4	1.1	0.1
Hsu Yu-Hui	1	1:37	0.0	0.0%	0.0%	0.0%	0.0	0.0	0.0	0.0
Lin Meng-Hsueh^{≠}	2	2:19	0.0	0.0%	0.0%	0.0%	1.0	0.0	0.0	0.0
Ivan Aska^{≠}	11	24:03	9.8	36.4%	22.2%	69.0%	6.9	1.8	1.3	0.1
Nysier Brooks^{≠}	22	30:36	14.0	56.0%	0.0%	59.5%	10.8	0.9	1.2	0.7
Tseng Wen-Ting	33	16:30	2.5	31.9%	18.9%	64.7%	2.6	1.5	0.5	0.3
Li Pei-Cheng	23	7:19	1.9	32.6%	39.4%	50.0%	0.6	0.2	0.1	0.0

^{‡} Left during the season
^{≠} Acquired during the season

- Reference：

== Transactions ==
On April 3, 2025, Yu Wei-Hao was not registered in the 2024–25 TPBL season final rosters.

=== Overview ===
Players added

Via draft

- Yu Wei-Hao

Via trade

- Lin Meng-Hsueh

Via free agency

- Ivan Aska
- Nysier Brooks
- James Eads
- Conner Frankamp
- Chevez Goodwin
- Bryan Griffin
- Hsu Yu-Hui
- Li Ruei-Ci
- Tevin Mack
- Daron Russell
- Shih Chin-Yao
- Raynere Thornton
- Marko Todorović
Players lost

Via free agency

- Mohammad Al Bachir Gadiaga
- Chen Yu-An
- Cody Demps
- Dragan Zeković
- Edgaras Želionis

Waived

- James Eads
- Conner Frankamp
- Chevez Goodwin
- Bryan Griffin
- Tevin Mack
- Jonah Morrison
- Raynere Thornton
- Marko Todorović

Retirement

- Liu Weir-Chern

=== Trades ===
Date	Trade		Ref.
December 2, 2024	To New Taipei CTBC DEA: Lin Meng-Hsueh	To Taoyuan Taiwan Beer Leopards: Cash considerations	

=== Free agency ===
==== Re-signed ====
Date	Player	Contract terms	Ref.
July 16, 2024	Wei Chia-Hao	2-year contract, worth unknown	
August 10, 2024	Kristijan Krajina	—N/a	
August 20, 2024	Jonah Morrison	Multi-year contract, worth unknown	

==== Additions ====
Date	Player	Contract terms	Former team	Ref.
July 18, 2024	Shih Chin-Yao	Multi-year contract, worth unknown	(Taiwan) Kaohsiung 17LIVE Steelers	
July 25, 2024	James Eads	—N/a	(Hungary) Szolnoki Olajbányász	
August 1, 2024	Chevez Goodwin	—N/a	(Germany) Rostock Seawolves	
August 2, 2024	Li Ruei-Ci	1+1-year contract, worth unknown	(Taiwan) Kaohsiung 17LIVE Steelers	
August 6, 2024	Bryan Griffin	—N/a	(Romania) CSM Constanța	
August 12, 2024	Yu Wei-Hao	—N/a	(Taiwan) NTUA	
August 14, 2024	Raynere Thornton	—N/a	(Germany) VfL SparkassenStars Bochum	
September 25, 2024	Hsu Yu-Hui	1-year contract, worth unknown	(Taiwan) NTSU	
November 4, 2024	Conner Frankamp	—N/a	(Spain) Palencia Baloncesto	
December 12, 2024	Tevin Mack	—N/a	(Libya) Al Ahli Tripoli	
December 17, 2024	Nysier Brooks	—N/a	(Russia) BC Samara	
January 24, 2025	Ivan Aska	—N/a	(Uruguay) Urunday Universitario	
February 25, 2025	Daron Russell	—N/a	(Turkey) Karşıyaka Basket	
February 25, 2025	Marko Todorović	—N/a	(Spain) UCAM Murcia	

==== Subtractions ====
Date	Player	Reason	New team	Ref.
May 27, 2024	Edgaras Želionis	Contract expired	(Venezuela) Marinos B.B.C.	
June 11, 2024	Mohammad Al Bachir Gadiaga	Execute to go overseas	(Japan) Akita Northern Happinets	
August 10, 2024	Dragan Zeković	Contract expired	(Uruguay) Club Malvín	
August 10, 2024	Cody Demps	Contract expired	(Israel) Elitzur Briga Netanya	
September 16, 2024	Chen Yu-An	Contract expired	(Taiwan) Kaohsiung 17LIVE Steelers	
October 11, 2024	Liu Weir-Chern	Retirement	(Taiwan) New Taipei CTBC DEA System Rising assistant coach	
November 4, 2024	Chevez Goodwin	Contract terminated	(Spain) Força Lleida	
November 21, 2024	Jonah Morrison	Contract terminated	Indefinite suspension but reinstated by TPBL → (Taiwan) Taoyuan Pauian Pilots	
December 12, 2024	James Eads	Contract terminated	(Azerbaijan) Sabah BC	
December 30, 2024	Raynere Thornton	Contract terminated	(Argentina) Argentino de Junín	
January 7, 2025	Bryan Griffin	Contract terminated	(South Korea) Changwon LG Sakers	
January 17, 2025	Conner Frankamp	Contract terminated	(Romania) Dinamo București	
January 24, 2025	Tevin Mack	Contract terminated	(Saudi Arabia) Al-Ittihad Jeddah	
March 25, 2025	Marko Todorović	Contract terminated	(Taiwan) New Taipei CTBC DEA	

== Awards ==
=== Yearly awards ===
Recipient	Award	Ref.
Li Ruei-Ci	Dunk of the Year	
Wei Chia-Hao	All-Defensive Second Team	
Hsieh Ya-Hsuan	All-Defensive Second Team	
Passion Sisters	Cheerleading Team of the Year	

=== Player of the Week ===
Week	Recipient	Award	Ref.
15	Daron Russell	Week 15 Player of the Week	
16	Marko Todorović	Week 16 Player of the Week	

=== Player of the Month ===
Month	Recipient	Award	Ref.
March	Daron Russell	March Player of the Month (import)	
