= 2024–25 Formosa Dreamers season =

Taiwanese professional basketball season

- President: Tien Lei
- General Manager: Han Chun-Kai
- Head Coach: Jamie Pearlman
- Arena: Taichung Intercontinental Basketball Stadium

TPBL results
- Record: 21–15 (58.3%)
- Place: 2nd
- Playoffs finish: Semifinals (lost to Aquas, 1–4)

Player records
- Points: Beau Beech 17.8
- Rebounds: Brandon Gilbeck 9.9
- Assists: Lin Chun-Chi 4.8

The 2024–25 Formosa Dreamers season was the franchise's eighth season, its first season in the Taiwan Professional Basketball League (TPBL).

The Dreamers were coached by Jamie Pearlman in his second year as head coach.

== Draft ==
Round	Pick	Player	Position(s)	School / club team
2	8	Shih Cheng-Ping	Forward	ISU

- Reference：

On July 20, 2024, the Dreamers' 2024 first-round pick and Yang Shen-Yen were traded to Taoyuan Taiwan Beer Leopards in exchange for cash considerations.

== Roster ==
2024–25 Formosa Dreamers roster
Players
Coaches

Pos.	No.	Nat.	Name	Ht.	Wt.	Age	From
SG	0	(Taiwan)	Chen Jen-Jei	1.83 m (6 ft 0 in)	80 kg (176 lb)	27 – 16 September 1997	Grand View
SF	2	(Taiwan)	Ma Chien-Hao	2.01 m (6 ft 7 in)	90 kg (198 lb)	24 – 29 April 2001	Georgia State
SG	3	(Taiwan)	Chang Tsung-Hsien	1.92 m (6 ft 4 in)	88 kg (194 lb)	36 – 27 December 1988	BYU–Hawaii
PF	5	(United States)	Beau Beech (I)	2.03 m (6 ft 8 in)	95 kg (209 lb)	31 – 1 March 1994	North Florida
C	7	(Bosnia and Herzegovina) (Croatia)	Markus Lončar (I)	2.13 m (7 ft 0 in)	104 kg (229 lb)	29 – 8 April 1996	Bosnia and Herzegovina
PG	8	(Taiwan)	Wang Chen-Yuan	1.76 m (5 ft 9 in)	70 kg (154 lb)	26 – 2 September 1998	NCCU
PG	9	(Taiwan)	Wu Chia-Chun	1.74 m (5 ft 9 in)	70 kg (154 lb)	31 – 3 March 1994	NTSU
PG	11	(Taiwan)	Lin Chun-Chi	1.75 m (5 ft 9 in)	70 kg (154 lb)	27 – 29 January 1998	UCH
SG	20	(Taiwan)	Chien Wei-Ju	1.86 m (6 ft 1 in)	85 kg (187 lb)	33 – 20 January 1992	NTNU
SF	21	(Taiwan) (United States)	Douglas Creighton (C)	2.00 m (6 ft 7 in)	90 kg (198 lb)	40 – 7 March 1985	Madonna
SF	24	(United States) (Taiwan)	Randall Walko (HP)	1.96 m (6 ft 5 in)	93 kg (205 lb)	26 – 21 September 1998	TCNJ
C	26	(Taiwan)	Lee Te-Wei	2.00 m (6 ft 7 in)	105 kg (231 lb)	33 – 15 October 1991	CCUT
SF	27	(Taiwan)	Shih Cheng-Ping	1.90 m (6 ft 3 in)	80 kg (176 lb)	25 – 1 October 1999	ISU
SG	28	(Taiwan)	Lu Kuan-Liang	1.85 m (6 ft 1 in)	90 kg (198 lb)	34 – 9 April 1991	NTUA
C	34	(United States) (Taiwan)	Brandon Gilbeck (I)	2.13 m (7 ft 0 in)	107 kg (236 lb)	28 – 9 December 1996	Western Illinois
PF	35	(United States)	Aric Holman (I)	2.08 m (6 ft 10 in)	100 kg (220 lb)	27 – 11 July 1997	Mississippi State
PG	41	(Taiwan)	Chiang Yu-An	1.74 m (5 ft 9 in)	75 kg (165 lb)	33 – 4 August 1991	NTUS
C	88	(Taiwan)	Chou Po-Chen	1.98 m (6 ft 6 in)	98 kg (216 lb)	34 – 8 August 1990	NTNU

Head coach

- (Australia) Jamie Pearlman

Assistant coach(es)

- (Taiwan) Lai Po-Lin
- (Taiwan) Chen Shih-Nien

Athletic trainer(s)

- (Taiwan) Hou Yao-Hsin
- (Taiwan) Chen Tzu-Chieh

Team manager

- (Taiwan) Han Chun-Kai

Legend

- (C) Team captain
- (I) Import player
- (HP) Heritage player
- Injured

- Roster
Updated: May 29, 2025

== Sendai 89ers 20th Anniversary International Friendly Game ==
Recap

September 5, 2024
19:00 (UTC+9)

Formosa Dreamers	68–90	Sendai 89ers

Kamei Arena Sendai, Sendai

== 2024 KT Sonicboom Taiwan Training Camp ==
Recap

September 15, 2024
14:30 (UTC+8)

Suwon KT Sonicboom	79–70	Formosa Dreamers

Taipei Heping Basketball Gymnasium, Taipei City

== Preseason ==
=== Game log ===
2024 preseason game log
Total: 2–1 (home: 2–0; road: 0–1)
Preseason : 2–1 (home: 2–0; road: 0–1)

Game	Date	Team	Score	High points	High rebounds	High assists	Location Attendance	Record
1	October 5	DEA	W 107–94	Beau Beech (37)	Beau Beech (14)	Lin Chun-Chi (6)	Taichung Intercontinental Basketball Stadium; 2,100	1–0
2	October 6	Kings	W 99–81	Aric Holman (34)	Aric Holman (13)	Chang Tsung-Hsien (3); Lin Chun-Chi (3)	Taichung Intercontinental Basketball Stadium; 2,807	2–0
3	October 12	@ Aquas	L 93–118	Beau Beech (24)	Ma Chien-Hao (6)	Lu Kuan-Liang (3)	Hsinchu County Stadium; 3,169	2–1

Color： Win Lose
Schedule

== Regular season ==
=== Standings ===
Pos	Team	Pld	W	L	PCT	GB	Qualification
1	New Taipei Kings	36	26	10	.722	—	Advance to semifinals
2	Formosa Dreamers	36	21	15	.583	5	Advance to semifinals
3	Kaohsiung Aquas	36	19	17	.528	7	Advance to semifinals
4	Taipei Taishin Mars	36	16	20	.444	10	Advance to play-in
5	Taoyuan Taiwan Beer Leopards	36	16	20	.444	10	Advance to play-in
6	New Taipei CTBC DEA	36	16	20	.444	10	
7	Hsinchu Toplus Lioneers	36	12	24	.333	14	

Source: TPBL

=== Game log ===
2024–25 regular season game log
Total: 21–15 (home: 14–4; road: 7–11)
October : 2–1 (home: 2–0; road: 0–1)

Game	Date	Team	Score	High points	High rebounds	High assists	Location Attendance	Record
1	October 19	DEA	W 88–74	Lin Chun-Chi (22)	Aric Holman (18)	Lin Chun-Chi (6)	Taichung Intercontinental Basketball Stadium; 3,000	1–0
2	October 20	Mars	W 105–85	Lin Chun-Chi (20)	Stefan Janković (11)	Lin Chun-Chi (7)	Taichung Intercontinental Basketball Stadium; 3,000	2–0
3	October 30	@ Kings	L 81–88	Beau Beech (19)	Aric Holman (10)	Brandon Gilbeck (5)	Xinzhuang Gymnasium; 3,261	2–1

November : 3–1 (home: 2–0; road: 1–1)

Game	Date	Team	Score	High points	High rebounds	High assists	Location Attendance	Record
4	November 3	@ DEA	W 89–82	Aric Holman (23)	Brandon Gilbeck (15)	Aric Holman (5)	Xinzhuang Gymnasium; 5,341	3–1
5	November 9	Aquas	W 99–90	Ma Chien-Hao (21)	Aric Holman (10)	Ma Chien-Hao (5)	Taichung Intercontinental Basketball Stadium; 3,000	4–1
6	November 10	Kings	W 87–76	Beau Beech (18); Aric Holman (18)	Aric Holman (18)	Beau Beech (3); Ma Chien-Hao (3)	Taichung Intercontinental Basketball Stadium; 3,000	5–1
7	November 30	@ Leopards	L 90–92	Beau Beech (24)	Beau Beech (16)	Lu Kuan-Liang (3); Lin Chun-Chi (3)	Taoyuan Arena; 5,205	5–2

December : 5–2 (home: 2–1; road: 3–1)

Game	Date	Team	Score	High points	High rebounds	High assists	Location Attendance	Record
8	December 8	@ Kings	L 89–121	Ma Chien-Hao (18)	Brandon Gilbeck (12)	Lin Chun-Chi (4)	Xinzhuang Gymnasium; 5,255	5–3
9	December 11	DEA	W 92–80	Ma Chien-Hao (15)	Brandon Gilbeck (14); Aric Holman (14)	Aric Holman (5)	Taichung Intercontinental Basketball Stadium; 2,383	6–3
10	December 13	Lioneers	W 96–81	Beau Beech (24)	Brandon Gilbeck (9); Aric Holman (9)	Wu Chia-Chun (8)	Taichung Intercontinental Basketball Stadium; 2,618	7–3
11	December 15	@ Mars	W 123–107	Ma Chien-Hao (26)	Brandon Gilbeck (11)	Wu Chia-Chun (6)	Taipei Heping Basketball Gymnasium; 3,897	8–3
12	December 22	@ Aquas	W 97–84	Lin Chun-Chi (21)	A.J. Pacher (11)	Wu Chia-Chun (5)	Kaohsiung Arena; 5,328	9–3
13	December 27	Mars	L 69–86	Lin Chun-Chi (15)	Brandon Gilbeck (13)	Wu Chia-Chun (2); Douglas Creighton (2)	Taichung Intercontinental Basketball Stadium; 2,480	9–4
14	December 29	@ Kings	W 101–95	Beau Beech (27)	A.J. Pacher (17)	Wu Chia-Chun (7)	Xinzhuang Gymnasium; 5,812	10–4

January : 2–3 (home: 2–1; road: 0–2)

Game	Date	Team	Score	High points	High rebounds	High assists	Location Attendance	Record
15	January 4	Leopards	L 111–117 (OT)	Beau Beech (29)	Beau Beech (13)	Lin Chun-Chi (7)	Taichung Intercontinental Basketball Stadium; 2,417	10–5
16	January 11	Kings	W 112–79	Lin Chun-Chi (30)	Randall Walko (9); Beau Beech (9); Brandon Gilbeck (9)	Lin Chun-Chi (8)	Taichung Intercontinental Basketball Stadium; 3,000	11–5
17	January 12	Leopards	W 110–102	Aric Holman (35)	Brandon Gilbeck (14)	Lin Chun-Chi (4); Wu Chia-Chun (4); A.J. Pacher (4)	Taichung Intercontinental Basketball Stadium; 2,048	12–5
18	January 18	@ Aquas	L 95–105	Beau Beech (24)	Beau Beech (18)	Lin Chun-Chi (9)	Kaohsiung Arena; 4,671	12–6
19	January 22	@ Lioneers	L 99–106	Beau Beech (21)	A.J. Pacher (12)	Lin Chun-Chi (9)	Hsinchu County Stadium; 4,051	12–7

February : 0–1 (home: 0–0; road: 0–1)

Game	Date	Team	Score	High points	High rebounds	High assists	Location Attendance	Record
20	February 9	@ Leopards	L 93–96	Ma Chien-Hao (23)	Brandon Gilbeck (12)	Chiang Yu-An (9)	Taoyuan Arena; 4,758	12–8

March : 4–3 (home: 3–1; road: 1–2)

Game	Date	Team	Score	High points	High rebounds	High assists	Location Attendance	Record
21	March 5	@ Mars	W 118–103	Beau Beech (33)	Anthony Bennett (16)	Wu Chia-Chun (8)	Taipei Heping Basketball Gymnasium; 2,568	13–8
22	March 9	@ Aquas	L 95–109	Ma Chien-Hao (20)	Brandon Gilbeck (12)	Lin Chun-Chi (7)	Kaohsiung Arena; 6,212	13–9
23	March 15	DEA	L 75–98	Lin Chun-Chi (14)	Brandon Gilbeck (18)	Lin Chun-Chi (4)	Taichung Intercontinental Basketball Stadium; 2,592	13–10
24	March 16	Mars	W 97–95	Chiang Yu-An (25)	Brandon Gilbeck (14)	Lin Chun-Chi (5)	Taichung Intercontinental Basketball Stadium; 2,858	14–10
25	March 22	Aquas	W 101–87	Chiang Yu-An (27)	Brandon Gilbeck (16)	Aric Holman (5)	Taichung Intercontinental Basketball Stadium; 2,793	15–10
26	March 23	Lioneers	W 110–105	Beau Beech (28)	Aric Holman (12)	Lin Chun-Chi (8)	Taichung Intercontinental Basketball Stadium; 2,862	16–10
27	March 29	@ DEA	L 81–88	Ma Chien-Hao (26)	Markus Lončar (17)	Wu Chia-Chun (6)	Xinzhuang Gymnasium; 4,047	16–11

April : 2–2 (home: 0–0; road: 2–2)

Game	Date	Team	Score	High points	High rebounds	High assists	Location Attendance	Record
28	April 5	@ Lioneers	L 90–107	Lin Chun-Chi (21)	Markus Lončar (13)	Markus Lončar (4)	Hsinchu County Stadium; 5,091	16–12
29	April 12	@ Mars	L 66–72	Markus Lončar (17)	Markus Lončar (21)	Chiang Yu-An (4)	Taipei Heping Basketball Gymnasium; 4,926	16–13
30	April 19	@ DEA	W 113–95	Beau Beech (25)	Beau Beech (14)	Aric Holman (6)	Xinzhuang Gymnasium; 4,403	17–13
31	April 26	@ Leopards	W 110–95	Beau Beech (27)	Aric Holman (11)	Lin Chun-Chi (7); Wu Chia-Chun (7)	Taoyuan Arena; 6,124	18–13

May : 3–2 (home: 3–1; road: 0–1)

Game	Date	Team	Score	High points	High rebounds	High assists	Location Attendance	Record
32	May 3	Lioneers	W 99–89	Ma Chien-Hao (23)	Beau Beech (16)	Ma Chien-Hao (4); Lin Chun-Chi (4); Chiang Yu-An (4)	Taichung Intercontinental Basketball Stadium; 2,439	19–13
33	May 4	Aquas	W 104–101	Ma Chien-Hao (28)	Brandon Gilbeck (8)	Lin Chun-Chi (6)	Taichung Intercontinental Basketball Stadium; 2,813	20–13
34	May 10	@ Lioneers	L 79–106	Beau Beech (24)	Beau Beech (9)	Lin Chun-Chi (5); Wu Chia-Chun (5)	Hsinchu County Stadium; 5,288	20–14
35	May 17	Kings	W 115–78	Lu Kuan-Liang (19)	Beau Beech (13)	Lin Chun-Chi (6)	Taichung Intercontinental Basketball Stadium; 3,000	21–14
36	May 18	Leopards	L 85–104	Chiang Yu-An (23)	Markus Lončar (14)	Chiang Yu-An (4)	Taichung Intercontinental Basketball Stadium; 2,368	21–15

Color： Win Lose
Schedule

== Playoffs ==
=== Game log ===
2025 playoffs game log
Total: 1–4 (home: 0–3; road: 1–1)
Semifinals : 1–4 (home: 0–3; road: 1–1)

Game	Date	Team	Score	High points	High rebounds	High assists	Location Attendance	Series
1	May 29	Aquas	L 99–104	Aric Holman (30)	Aric Holman (15)	Ma Chien-Hao (2); Chiang Yu-An (2); Aric Holman (2)	Taichung Intercontinental Basketball Stadium; 3,000	0–1
2	May 31	Aquas	L 90–93	Chiang Yu-An (21)	Aric Holman (12)	Chiang Yu-An (8)	Taichung Intercontinental Basketball Stadium; 3,000	0–2
3	June 4	@ Aquas	L 79–88	Lin Chun-Chi (19)	Aric Holman (11)	Lin Chun-Chi (6)	Kaohsiung Arena; 6,018	0–3
4	June 6	@ Aquas	W 106–92	Chiang Yu-An (33)	Aric Holman (13)	Chiang Yu-An (4)	Kaohsiung Arena; 7,123	1–3
5	June 8	Aquas	L 102–105	Brandon Gilbeck (21)	Brandon Gilbeck (12)	Aric Holman (6)	Taichung Intercontinental Basketball Stadium; 3,000	1–4

Color： Win Lose
Schedule

== Player statistics ==
Legend
GP	Games played	MPG	Minutes per game	FG%	Field goal percentage
3P%	3-point field goal percentage	FT%	Free throw percentage	RPG	Rebounds per game
APG	Assists per game	SPG	Steals per game	BPG	Blocks per game
PPG	Points per game		Led the league

=== Regular season ===
Player	GP	MPG	PPG	FG%	3P%	FT%	RPG	APG	SPG	BPG
Chen Jen-Jei	31	14:17	4.6	34.0%	27.9%	77.8%	2.0	0.6	0.5	0.0
Ma Chien-Hao	33	29:34	14.9	39.0%	34.6%	73.9%	3.6	2.1	0.7	0.2
Chang Tsung-Hsien	23	18:02	5.9	39.2%	24.0%	75.0%	1.6	1.4	0.5	0.0
A.J. Pacher^{≠‡}	10	30:59	13.1	45.8%	16.7%	61.3%	9.6	1.3	0.8	0.4
Beau Beech	31	34:11	17.8	38.5%	36.5%	77.9%	9.9	1.8	1.9	0.5
Markus Lončar^{≠}	7	31:29	12.3	55.7%	28.6%	61.5%	12.7	1.1	0.9	1.3
Wang Chen-Yuan	8	4:00	1.0	37.5%	0.0%	100.0%	0.3	0.1	0.3	0.0
Wu Chia-Chun	34	17:33	5.1	36.4%	27.3%	82.1%	2.0	2.9	0.5	0.1
Lin Chun-Chi	30	28:30	14.1	46.6%	42.1%	84.1%	3.3	4.8	0.8	0.0
Anthony Bennett^{≠‡}	5	27:45	16.0	50.8%	24.1%	64.7%	9.0	1.2	0.4	0.6
Chien Wei-Ju	9	4:32	0.3	9.1%	14.3%	0.0%	0.9	0.2	0.0	0.0
Douglas Creighton	36	22:23	5.4	38.0%	32.4%	63.6%	2.9	1.3	0.6	0.1
Randall Walko	20	18:06	5.6	36.0%	25.9%	58.1%	4.0	0.8	0.5	0.1
Lee Te-Wei	Did not play									
Shih Cheng-Ping	9	5:09	2.1	26.3%	33.3%	75.0%	1.1	0.0	0.3	0.0
Lu Kuan-Liang	26	15:35	3.1	29.6%	23.8%	50.0%	1.2	1.0	0.6	0.0
Stefan Janković^{‡}	1	15:43	9.0	66.7%	50.0%	0.0%	11.0	1.0	0.0	0.0
Brandon Gilbeck	31	29:27	11.4	68.3%	0.0%	51.1%	9.9	1.2	1.1	3.2
Aric Holman	17	28:28	16.9	38.1%	24.1%	78.2%	10.6	3.2	1.0	1.5
Chiang Yu-An	13	26:31	11.7	38.8%	26.8%	78.7%	2.7	3.2	0.6	0.1
Chou Po-Chen	24	8:16	1.2	42.9%	16.7%	30.8%	1.8	0.1	0.3	0.0

^{‡} Left during the season
^{≠} Acquired during the season

=== Semifinals ===
Player	GP	MPG	PPG	FG%	3P%	FT%	RPG	APG	SPG	BPG
Chen Jen-Jei	4	9:49	7.8	52.4%	46.7%	100.0%	0.5	0.3	0.0	0.0
Ma Chien-Hao	5	33:28	12.0	32.3%	20.9%	64.7%	3.6	1.4	0.6	0.0
Chang Tsung-Hsien	5	17:45	4.0	26.1%	16.7%	87.5%	1.8	0.8	0.6	0.2
Beau Beech	2	29:02	7.0	25.0%	22.2%	100.0%	7.0	0.5	1.0	0.5
Markus Lončar	5	22:41	7.8	60.0%	0.0%	100.0%	6.8	1.4	0.2	1.2
Wang Chen-Yuan	Did not play									
Wu Chia-Chun	4	3:01	0.5	50.0%	0.0%	0.0%	0.3	0.0	0.0	0.0
Lin Chun-Chi	5	26:51	13.2	46.8%	33.3%	82.4%	2.4	3.6	1.4	0.0
Chien Wei-Ju	Did not play									
Douglas Creighton	3	16:35	1.0	12.5%	14.3%	0.0%	2.3	1.3	0.7	0.0
Randall Walko	5	13:58	6.6	54.2%	42.9%	100.0%	2.6	0.4	0.2	0.2
Lee Te-Wei	Did not play									
Shih Cheng-Ping	1	0:03	0.0	0.0%	0.0%	0.0%	0.0	0.0	0.0	0.0
Lu Kuan-Liang	1	11:30	3.0	25.0%	50.0%	0.0%	1.0	0.0	0.0	0.0
Brandon Gilbeck	3	28:11	14.3	84.2%	0.0%	61.1%	8.3	0.3	1.0	0.7
Aric Holman	5	36:10	16.4	40.5%	25.0%	81.3%	11.0	3.0	1.4	1.4
Chiang Yu-An	5	33:12	16.0	41.3%	40.0%	84.2%	5.0	4.2	1.6	0.0
Chou Po-Chen	4	6:00	0.0	0.0%	0.0%	0.0%	1.3	0.0	0.0	0.3

- Reference：

== Transactions ==
=== Overview ===
Players added

Via draft

- Shih Cheng-Ping

Via free agency

- Beau Beech
- Anthony Bennett
- Chang Tsung-Hsien
- Chiang Yu-An
- Chien Wei-Ju
- Aric Holman
- Stefan Jankovic
- Markus Lončar
- Ma Chien-Hao
- A.J. Pacher
- Emondre Rickman
Players lost

Via trade

- Ting Kuang-Hao
- Yang Shen-Yen

Via free agency

- Julian Boyd
- Kenneth Chien
- Lin Yao-Tsung
- Devyn Marble
- A.J. Pacher
- Emondre Rickman

Waived

- Anthony Bennett
- Stefan Janković

Retirement

- Wu Sung-Wei

=== Trades ===
Date	Trade		Ref.
July 8, 2024	To Formosa Dreamers: Cash considerations	To Taiwan Beer Leopards: Ting Kuang-Hao	
July 20, 2024	To Formosa Dreamers: Cash considerations	To Taoyuan Taiwan Beer Leopards: Yang Shen-Yen; 2024 Dreamers' first-round pick	

=== Free agency ===
==== Re-signed ====
Date	Player	Contract terms	Ref.
July 4, 2024	Chen Jen-Jei	3-year contract, worth unknown	
July 4, 2024	Lee Te-Wei	3-year contract, worth unknown	
July 4, 2024	Lu Kuan-Liang	3-year contract, worth unknown	
July 4, 2024	Wu Chia-Chun	3-year contract, worth unknown	
August 2, 2024	Brandon Gilbeck	—N/a	

==== Additions ====
Date	Player	Contract terms	Former team	Ref.
July 2, 2024	Chiang Yu-An	5-year contract, worth unknown	Taiwan Beer Leopards	
July 12, 2024	Chang Tsung-Hsien	—N/a	(Taiwan) Taipei Fubon Braves	
July 17, 2024	Chien Wei-Ju	—N/a	(Taiwan) Tainan TSG GhostHawks	
July 30, 2024	Shih Cheng-Ping	—N/a	(Taiwan) ISU	
August 9, 2024	Ma Chien-Hao	—N/a	(China) Jiangsu Dragons	
August 14, 2024	Aric Holman	—N/a	(Libya) Al-Nasr	
August 23, 2024	Stefan Jankovic	Testing player contract, worth unknown	(Canada) Vancouver Bandits	
August 23, 2024	Emondre Rickman	Testing player contract, worth unknown	(Japan) Tachikawa Dice	
September 10, 2024	Beau Beech	—N/a	(Russia) BC Enisey	
November 18, 2024	A.J. Pacher	—N/a	(Germany) Riesen Ludwigsburg	
December 24, 2024	Anthony Bennett	—N/a	(Taiwan) Kaohsiung 17LIVE Steelers	
March 25, 2025	Markus Lončar	—N/a	(Lebanon) CS Antonine	

==== Subtractions ====
Date	Player	Reason	New team	Ref.
June 4, 2024	Lin Yao-Tsung	Contract expired	—N/a	
July 1, 2024	Kenneth Chien	Contract expired	(Taiwan) Taipei Taishin Mars	
July 1, 2024	Wu Sung-Wei	Contract expired → Retirement	—N/a	
August 28, 2024	Julian Boyd	Contract expired	(Taiwan) Taoyuan Pauian Pilots	
September 3, 2024	Devyn Marble	Contract expired	(Portugal) Porto	
September 20, 2024	Emondre Rickman	Contract expired	(Portugal) Ovarense Basquetebol	
November 16, 2024	Stefan Janković	Contract terminated	(Canada) Calgary Surge	
March 18, 2025	A.J. Pacher	Contract terminated	(Latvia) Valmiera Glass ViA	
March 26, 2025	Anthony Bennett	Contract terminated	(Bahrain) Al-Najma	

== Awards ==
=== Yearly awards ===
Recipient	Award	Ref.
Brandon Gilbeck	Blocks Leader	
Brandon Gilbeck	Defensive Player of the Year	
Brandon Gilbeck	All-Defensive First Team	
Brandon Gilbeck	All-TPBL Second Team	
Ma Chien-Hao	All-TPBL First Team	
Lin Chun-Chi	All-TPBL Second Team	

=== Player of the Week ===
Week	Recipient	Award	Ref.
1	Lin Chun-Chi	Week 1 Player of the Week	
3	Aric Holman	Week 3 Player of the Week	
4	Ma Chien-Hao	Week 4 Player of the Week	
7	Douglas Creighton	Week 7 Player of the Week	
11	Aric Holman	Week 11 Player of the Week	
24	Ma Chien-Hao	Week 24 Player of the Week	
