= 2024–25 Taipei Taishin Mars season =

Taiwanese professional basketball season

- President: Tiao Chien-Sheng
- General Manager: Lin You-Ting
- Head Coach: Hsu Hao-Cheng
- Arena: Taipei Heping Basketball Gymnasium; Hsinchu County Stadium

TPBL results
- Record: 16–20 (44.4%)
- Place: 4th
- Playoffs finish: Semifinals (lost to Kings, 0–4)

Player records
- Points: Malcolm Miller 16.9
- Rebounds: Micheal Eric 9.9
- Assists: Ting Sheng-Ju 4.6

The 2024–25 Taipei Taishin Mars season was the franchise's second season, its first season in the Taiwan Professional Basketball League (TPBL).

On August 28, 2024, the Mars promoted Hsu Hao-Cheng, the interim head coach of the Taipei Mars, as their new head coach.

== Draft ==
Round	Pick	Player	Position(s)	School / club team
1	1	Samuel Manu	Guard	UC Davis
1	6	Chiang Chun	Forward	FJU

- Reference：

On July 12, 2023, Taishin acquired Huang Tsung-Han and 2024 first-round pick from TaiwanBeer Leopards in exchange for 2023 first-round 2nd pick. Taishin's 2023 second-round 3rd pick and 2024 second-round pick were traded to Taichung Suns in exchange for 2023 first-round pick.

== Roster ==
2024–25 Taipei Taishin Mars roster
Players
Coaches

Pos.	No.	Nat.	Name	Ht.	Wt.	Age	From
G	2	(United States)	Ray McCallum (I)	1.90 m (6 ft 3 in)	86 kg (190 lb)	33 – 12 June 1991	Detroit Mercy
PG	3	(Taiwan)	Ting Sheng-Ju	1.74 m (5 ft 9 in)	75 kg (165 lb)	26 – 22 August 1998	St. Francis
SF	6	(Taiwan)	Chiang Chun	1.93 m (6 ft 4 in)	93 kg (205 lb)	23 – 11 September 2001	FJU
SF	8	(Taiwan)	Chen Wen-Hung	1.88 m (6 ft 2 in)	98 kg (216 lb)	33 – 14 July 1991	NTSU
PF	9	(Taiwan)	Chang Chao-Chen	1.96 m (6 ft 5 in)	97 kg (214 lb)	24 – 2 September 2000	NTNU
SF	11	(Taiwan)	Huang Tsung-Han	1.93 m (6 ft 4 in)	96 kg (212 lb)	30 – 7 July 1994	MDU
PF	12	(Taiwan)	Lin Yi-Huei (C)	1.92 m (6 ft 4 in)	100 kg (220 lb)	39 – 24 March 1986	NTNU
SF	13	(United States)	Malcolm Miller (I)	2.01 m (6 ft 7 in)	95 kg (209 lb)	32 – 6 March 1993	Holy Cross
F	18	(France)	Adrien Moerman (I)	2.02 m (6 ft 8 in)	108 kg (238 lb)	36 – 7 August 1988	France
SG	23	(United States) (Taiwan)	Kenneth Chien (HP)	1.86 m (6 ft 1 in)	88 kg (194 lb)	30 – 6 February 1995	Broward
SG	24	(Taiwan)	Wang Lu-Hsiang	1.81 m (5 ft 11 in)	80 kg (176 lb)	27 – 21 December 1997	CCUT
SG	29	(Taiwan)	Chang Keng-Yu	1.88 m (6 ft 2 in)	88 kg (194 lb)	29 – 16 October 1995	NTUS
G	33	(Taiwan) (United States)	Samuel Manu	1.97 m (6 ft 6 in)	91 kg (201 lb)	24 – 24 September 2000	UC Davis
PF	41	(Taiwan)	Su Yi-Chin	1.95 m (6 ft 5 in)	95 kg (209 lb)	31 – 29 December 1993	MDU
C	50	(Nigeria)	Micheal Eric (I)	2.10 m (6 ft 11 in)	109 kg (240 lb)	36 – 24 June 1988	Temple
SG	57	(Taiwan) (Vietnam)	Tsao Xun-Xiang	1.81 m (5 ft 11 in)	81 kg (179 lb)	26 – 16 March 1999	NTUA
C	62	(Taiwan)	Chen Kuan-Chuan	1.97 m (6 ft 6 in)	105 kg (231 lb)	31 – 30 December 1993	NTSU

Head coach

- (Taiwan) Hsu Hao-Cheng

Assistant coach(es)

- (Taiwan) Ni Hsueh-Chien
- (Serbia) Milan Stevanovic

Strength & conditioning coach(es)

- (Taiwan) Chen Sheng-Chuan
- (Taiwan) Liu Yu-Jie

Athletic trainer(s)

- (Taiwan) Chien Shao-Fu
- (Taiwan) Guan Yen-Lin

Team manager

- (Taiwan) Lin You-Ting

Legend

- (C) Team captain
- (I) Import player
- (HP) Heritage player
- Injured

- Roster
Updated: May 11, 2025

== Summer League ==
=== Game log ===
Recap

August 24, 2024
14:00 (UTC+8)

New Taipei CTBC DEA	78–87	Taipei Taishin Mars

CTBC administration building basketball court, Taipei City

Recap

August 27, 2024
14:00 (UTC+8)

Taipei Taishin Mars	83–81	New Taipei CTBC DEA

CTBC administration building basketball court, Taipei City

Recap

August 29, 2024
14:00 (UTC+8)

Taoyuan Taiwan Beer Leopards	61–72	Taipei Taishin Mars

CTBC administration building basketball court, Taipei City

Recap

September 7, 2024
14:00 (UTC+8)

Taipei Taishin Mars	80–87	Hsinchu Toplus Lioneers

CTBC administration building basketball court, Taipei City

Recap

September 12, 2024
14:00 (UTC+8)

Taipei Taishin Mars	73–63	Taoyuan Taiwan Beer Leopards

CTBC administration building basketball court, Taipei City

== Lioneers Masters Game ==
=== Game log ===
Recap

August 31, 2024
14:00 (UTC+8)

New Taipei CTBC DEA	76–101	Taipei Taishin Mars

Hsinchu County Stadium, Hsinchu County

Recap

September 1, 2024
17:00 (UTC+8)

Taipei Taishin Mars	89–94	Hsinchu Toplus Lioneers

Hsinchu County Stadium, Hsinchu County

== 2024 KT Sonicboom Taiwan Training Camp ==
Recap

September 14, 2024
14:30 (UTC+8)

Suwon KT Sonicboom	78–69	Taipei Taishin Mars

Taipei Heping Basketball Gymnasium, Taipei City

== International friendship match ==
=== Game log ===
September 18, 2024
15:00 (UTC+8)

Goyang Sono Skygunners	87–84	Taipei Taishin Mars
The match called end at the 7 minutes 17 seconds remaining of the 4th quarter.

New Taipei City Zhonghe Civil Sports Center, New Taipei City

September 25, 2024
15:00 (UTC+8)

Anyang Jung Kwan Jang Red Boosters	106–88	Taipei Taishin Mars

New Taipei City Banqiao Civil Sports Center, New Taipei City

September 26, 2024
15:00 (UTC+8)

Changwon LG Sakers	100–86	Taipei Taishin Mars

New Taipei City Banqiao Civil Sports Center, New Taipei City

== Preseason ==
=== Game log ===
2024 preseason game log
Total: 0–2 (home: 0–1; road: 0–1)
Preseason : 0–2 (home: 0–1; road: 0–1)

Game	Date	Team	Score	High points	High rebounds	High assists	Location Attendance	Record
1	October 5	Leopards	L 90–92	Devin Oliver (20)	Malcolm Miller (11)	Ting Sheng-Ju (4); Malcolm Miller (4); Tsao Xun-Xiang (4)	Taichung Intercontinental Basketball Stadium; 2,100	0–1
2	October 12	@ Lioneers	L 108–111	Devin Oliver (25)	Ting Sheng-Ju (7)	Ting Sheng-Ju (11)	Hsinchu County Stadium; 3,169	0–2

Color： Win Lose
Schedule

== Regular season ==
=== Standings ===
Pos	Team	Pld	W	L	PCT	GB	Qualification
1	New Taipei Kings	36	26	10	.722	—	Advance to semifinals
2	Formosa Dreamers	36	21	15	.583	5	Advance to semifinals
3	Kaohsiung Aquas	36	19	17	.528	7	Advance to semifinals
4	Taipei Taishin Mars	36	16	20	.444	10	Advance to play-in
5	Taoyuan Taiwan Beer Leopards	36	16	20	.444	10	Advance to play-in
6	New Taipei CTBC DEA	36	16	20	.444	10	
7	Hsinchu Toplus Lioneers	36	12	24	.333	14	

Source: TPBL

=== Game log ===
2024–25 regular season game log
Total: 16–20 (home: 11–7; road: 5–13)
October : 0–2 (home: 0–0; road: 0–2)

Game	Date	Team	Score	High points	High rebounds	High assists	Location Attendance	Record
1	October 20	@ Dreamers	L 85–105	Devin Oliver (23)	Malcolm Miller (7); Devin Oliver (7)	Tsao Xun-Xiang (7)	Taichung Intercontinental Basketball Stadium; 3,000	0–1
2	October 26	@ Aquas	L 71–88	Malcolm Miller (20)	Devin Oliver (9)	Ting Sheng-Ju (7)	Kaohsiung Arena; 3,619	0–2

November : 1–2 (home: 0–2; road: 1–0)

Game	Date	Team	Score	High points	High rebounds	High assists	Location Attendance	Record
3	November 2	Lioneers	L 76–79	Ting Sheng-Ju (16)	Devin Oliver (13)	Ting Sheng-Ju (4); Tsao Xun-Xiang (4)	Taipei Heping Basketball Gymnasium; 4,219	0–3
4	November 3	Leopards	L 78–82	Devin Oliver (22)	Devin Oliver (12)	Ting Sheng-Ju (8)	Taipei Heping Basketball Gymnasium; 3,259	0–4
5	November 10	@ Lioneers	W 94–84	Ihor Zaytsev (19); Malcolm Miller (19)	Ting Sheng-Ju (11); Devin Oliver (11); Ihor Zaytsev (11)	Ting Sheng-Ju (12)	Hsinchu County Stadium; 5,433	1–4

December : 4–3 (home: 1–2; road: 3–1)

Game	Date	Team	Score	High points	High rebounds	High assists	Location Attendance	Record
6	December 1	@ DEA	W 85–76	Ray McCallum (23)	Micheal Eric (13)	Ray McCallum (7)	Xinzhuang Gymnasium; 3,441	2–4
7	December 8	@ Leopards	W 95–74	Micheal Eric (23)	Micheal Eric (11)	Ray McCallum (13)	Taoyuan Arena; 4,678	3–4
8	December 14	DEA	W 98–91	Micheal Eric (20)	Micheal Eric (15)	Ray McCallum (14)	Taipei Heping Basketball Gymnasium; 4,027	4–4
9	December 15	Dreamers	L 107–123	Thomas Robinson (23)	Micheal Eric (10)	Ting Sheng-Ju (9)	Taipei Heping Basketball Gymnasium; 3,897	4–5
10	December 18	@ Aquas	L 94–102	Micheal Eric (20)	Thomas Robinson (14)	Ting Sheng-Ju (5)	Kaohsiung Arena; 2,371	4–6
11	December 21	Kings	L 89–102	Thomas Robinson (23)	Micheal Eric (12)	Tsao Xun-Xiang (7)	Taipei Heping Basketball Gymnasium; 4,668	4–7
12	December 27	@ Dreamers	W 86–69	Malcolm Miller (18)	Malcolm Miller (12); Micheal Eric (12)	Ting Sheng-Ju (9)	Taichung Intercontinental Basketball Stadium; 2,480	5–7

January : 3–2 (home: 3–0; road: 0–2)

Game	Date	Team	Score	High points	High rebounds	High assists	Location Attendance	Record
13	January 5	Aquas	W 100–90	Malcolm Miller (22)	Malcolm Miller (14)	Ting Sheng-Ju (11)	Taipei Heping Basketball Gymnasium; 3,326	6–7
14	January 8	DEA	W 89–85 (OT)	Samuel Manu (20); Malcolm Miller (20)	Thomas Robinson (15)	Ting Sheng-Ju (6)	Taipei Heping Basketball Gymnasium; 2,246	7–7
15	January 10	Leopards	W 97–85	Malcolm Miller (26)	Thomas Robinson (15)	Ting Sheng-Ju (4)	Taipei Heping Basketball Gymnasium; 2,942	8–7
16	January 15	@ Aquas	L 76–98	Malcolm Miller (16)	Malcolm Miller (13)	Tsao Xun-Xiang (5)	Kaohsiung Arena; 2,812	8–8
17	January 18	@ Dreamers	L 105–117	Malcolm Miller (28)	Malcolm Miller (16)	Ting Sheng-Ju (4)	Hsinchu County Stadium; 3,822	8–9

February : 2–0 (home: 2–0; road: 0–0)

Game	Date	Team	Score	High points	High rebounds	High assists	Location Attendance	Record
18	February 7	DEA	W 72–69	Ray McCallum (18)	Adrien Moerman (16)	Micheal Eric (2); Ting Sheng-Ju (2); Adrien Moerman (2)	Taipei Heping Basketball Gymnasium; 4,866	9–9
19	February 9	Lioneers	W 100–90	Adrien Moerman (26)	Adrien Moerman (13)	Ray McCallum (9)	Taipei Heping Basketball Gymnasium; 3,853	10–9

March : 3–5 (home: 3–2; road: 0–3)

Game	Date	Team	Score	High points	High rebounds	High assists	Location Attendance	Record
20	March 1	Kings	W 106–100	Kenneth Chien (23)	Adrien Moerman (16)	Ray McCallum (7)	Taipei Heping Basketball Gymnasium; 4,798	11–9
21	March 2	Aquas	L 80–99	Samuel Manu (18)	Micheal Eric (7); Malcolm Miller (7)	Ray McCallum (6)	Taipei Heping Basketball Gymnasium; 2,991	11–10
22	March 5	Dreamers	L 103–118	Ray McCallum (20)	Micheal Eric (11)	Ray McCallum (6)	Taipei Heping Basketball Gymnasium; 2,568	11–11
23	March 9	@ DEA	L 82–105	Ray McCallum (16)	Malcolm Miller (10)	Ray McCallum (7)	Xinzhuang Gymnasium; 2,935	11–12
24	March 16	@ Dreamers	L 95–97	Micheal Eric (24)	Adrien Moerman (13)	Tsao Xun-Xiang (5)	Taichung Intercontinental Basketball Stadium; 2,858	11–13
25	March 22	@ Kings	L 87–114	Samuel Manu (17)	Adrien Moerman (15)	Ray McCallum (3)	Xinzhuang Gymnasium; 3,804	11–14
26	March 29	Leopards	W 97–88	Malcolm Miller (28)	Adrien Moerman (13)	Ting Sheng-Ju (9)	Taipei Heping Basketball Gymnasium; 5,568	12–14
27	March 30	Lioneers	W 117–98	Ray McCallum (27)	Adrien Moerman (17)	Ray McCallum (12)	Taipei Heping Basketball Gymnasium; 3,827	13–14

April : 3–4 (home: 2–1; road: 1–3)

Game	Date	Team	Score	High points	High rebounds	High assists	Location Attendance	Record
28	April 4	@ Leopards	L 97–100	Malcolm Miller (22)	Malcolm Miller (21)	Ting Sheng-Ju (9)	Taoyuan Arena; 4,838	13–15
29	April 6	@ Kings	L 96–112	Ray McCallum (27)	Micheal Eric (13); Malcolm Miller (13)	Samuel Manu (5)	Xinzhuang Gymnasium; 3,866	13–16
30	April 9	@ Lioneers	L 92–103	Malcolm Miller (18)	Adrien Moerman (11)	Ting Sheng-Ju (7)	Hsinchu County Stadium; 3,047	13–17
31	April 12	Dreamers	W 72–66	Samuel Manu (21)	Micheal Eric (14)	Ting Sheng-Ju (5)	Taipei Heping Basketball Gymnasium; 4,926	14–17
32	April 13	Aquas	L 76–96	Adrien Moerman (21)	Adrien Moerman (13)	Ting Sheng-Ju (5); Ray McCallum (5)	Taipei Heping Basketball Gymnasium; 3,699	14–18
33	April 16	Kings	W 107–83	Adrien Moerman (30)	Adrien Moerman (15)	Ray McCallum (10)	Taipei Heping Basketball Gymnasium; 4,555	15–18
34	April 27	@ Leopards	W 89–86	Ray McCallum (28)	Samuel Manu (12)	Ting Sheng-Ju (7)	Taoyuan Arena; 5,738	16–18

May : 0–2 (home: 0–0; road: 0–2)

Game	Date	Team	Score	High points	High rebounds	High assists	Location Attendance	Record
—	May 3	@ Kings	Rescheduled to May 9					
35	May 9	@ Kings	L 97–102	Micheal Eric (23)	Micheal Eric (12)	Samuel Manu (6)	Xinzhuang Gymnasium; 3,423	16–19
36	May 11	@ DEA	L 89–96	Ray McCallum (26)	Micheal Eric (12)	Ray McCallum (5)	Xinzhuang Gymnasium; 4,054	16–20

Color： Win Lose Rescheduled
Schedule

=== Regular season note ===
- Due to the 2025 Basketball Champions League Asia – East, the TPBL declared that the game on May 3 would be rescheduled to May 9.

== Playoffs ==
=== Game log ===
2025 playoffs game log
Total: 1–5 (home: 1–2; road: 0–3
Play-in : 1–1 (home: 1–0; road: 0–1)

Game	Date	Team	Score	High points	High rebounds	High assists	Location Attendance	Series
1	May 23	@ Leopards	L 68–113	Samuel Manu (12)	Micheal Eric (7)	Ting Sheng-Ju (4); Ray McCallum (4)	Taoyuan Arena; 3,813	1–1
2	May 25	Leopards	W 86–84	Kenneth Chien (20)	Adrien Moerman (12)	Ray McCallum (8)	Hsinchu County Stadium; 2,288	2–1

Semifinals : 0–4 (home: 0–2; road: 0–2)

Game	Date	Team	Score	High points	High rebounds	High assists	Location Attendance	Series
1	May 30	@ Kings	L 88–111	Samuel Manu (25)	Malcolm Miller (9)	Ray McCallum (8)	Xinzhuang Gymnasium; 5,802	0–1
2	June 1	@ Kings	L 83–109	Micheal Eric (15)	Micheal Eric (8)	Ray McCallum (3)	Xinzhuang Gymnasium; 6,248	0–2
3	June 5	Kings	L 104–113	Adrien Moerman (37)	Adrien Moerman (12)	Adrien Moerman (8)	Taipei Heping Basketball Gymnasium; 3,380	0–3
4	June 7	Kings	L 93–101	Ting Sheng-Ju (17)	Micheal Eric (11)	Ting Sheng-Ju (4); Tsao Xun-Xiang (4)	Taipei Heping Basketball Gymnasium; 5,200	0–4

Color： Win Lose
Schedule

=== Play-in note ===
- The fourth seed, Taipei Taishin Mars, was awarded a one-win advantage before the play-in series.

== Player statistics ==
Legend
GP	Games played	MPG	Minutes per game	FG%	Field goal percentage
3P%	3-point field goal percentage	FT%	Free throw percentage	RPG	Rebounds per game
APG	Assists per game	SPG	Steals per game	BPG	Blocks per game
PPG	Points per game		Led the league

=== Regular season ===
Player	GP	MPG	PPG	FG%	3P%	FT%	RPG	APG	SPG	BPG
Thomas Robinson^{≠‡}	10	25:52	17.1	45.9%	8.3%	55.4%	10.8	1.1	1.0	0.6
Ray McCallum^{≠}	21	35:59	18.5	40.9%	30.8%	71.4%	6.5	6.1	1.9	0.1
Ting Sheng-Ju	35	27:38	8.1	34.4%	29.2%	67.0%	3.3	4.6	1.0	0.0
Byron Mullens^{‡}	1	23:33	2.0	14.3%	0.0%	0.0%	4.0	1.0	1.0	0.0
Chiang Chun	21	5:24	1.6	35.7%	30.8%	64.3%	0.4	0.1	0.2	0.0
Jeantal Cylla^{≠}	1	25:45	19.0	35.3%	100.0%	83.3%	6.0	2.0	0.0	1.0
Chen Wen-Hung	35	23:19	5.3	38.1%	28.9%	61.5%	2.0	1.0	0.9	0.3
Chang Chao-Chen	12	4:38	0.9	25.0%	0.0%	50.0%	0.8	0.3	0.4	0.3
Huang Tsung-Han	22	21:20	5.4	27.5%	26.1%	68.8%	2.2	0.8	0.7	0.1
Lin Yi-Huei	4	3:26	0.0	0.0%	0.0%	0.0%	0.8	0.3	0.0	0.0
Malcolm Miller	27	32:04	16.9	45.2%	26.7%	78.8%	9.6	1.7	1.3	1.6
Devin Oliver^{‡}	5	34:37	16.8	36.4%	27.0%	50.0%	10.4	2.2	2.0	0.6
Adrien Moerman^{≠}	13	31:22	15.2	33.7%	21.6%	65.5%	13.0	1.8	1.4	0.7
Sun Szu-Yao^{‡}	1	0:38	0.0	0.0%	0.0%	0.0%	0.0	0.0	0.0	0.0
Kenneth Chien	23	23:31	9.9	42.3%	26.1%	69.7%	2.9	1.1	0.9	0.0
Wang Lu-Hsiang	25	13:16	3.6	32.0%	26.9%	91.7%	0.8	0.4	0.5	0.1
Chang Keng-Yu	19	5:32	0.9	41.2%	0.0%	75.0%	0.6	0.3	0.1	0.1
Ihor Zaytsev^{‡}	4	28:07	10.5	45.2%	9.1%	50.0%	6.5	2.3	0.8	0.3
Samuel Manu	36	28:07	10.1	41.2%	27.9%	55.7%	4.5	2.1	1.5	0.4
Su Yi-Chin	20	14:34	3.8	40.5%	23.1%	60.0%	1.7	0.8	0.5	0.3
Micheal Eric^{≠}	26	26:24	14.2	53.7%	0.0%	59.5%	9.9	1.2	0.6	0.6
Tsao Xun-Xiang	22	11:12	3.0	28.4%	20.0%	56.5%	1.3	2.0	0.5	0.0
Chen Kuan-Chuan	33	11:46	2.5	31.5%	30.0%	78.6%	2.2	0.4	0.4	0.2

^{‡} Left during the season
^{≠} Acquired during the season

=== Play-in ===
Player	GP	MPG	PPG	FG%	3P%	FT%	RPG	APG	SPG	BPG
Ray McCallum	2	30:55	8.5	25.9%	12.5%	66.7%	5.5	6.0	0.0	0.5
Ting Sheng-Ju	2	26:27	8.5	40.0%	33.3%	66.7%	4.5	4.5	1.0	0.0
Chiang Chun	1	10:12	8.0	60.0%	50.0%	100.0%	2.0	0.0	0.0	0.0
Chen Wen-Hung	2	21:34	6.5	41.7%	37.5%	0.0%	1.0	0.0	0.5	0.0
Chang Chao-Chen	1	4:34	2.0	100.0%	0.0%	0.0%	1.0	0.0	0.0	0.0
Huang Tsung-Han	1	10:00	3.0	25.0%	25.0%	0.0%	0.0	0.0	1.0	0.0
Lin Yi-Huei	Did not play									
Malcolm Miller	1	29:07	15.0	36.4%	50.0%	50.0%	6.0	0.0	0.0	1.0
Adrien Moerman	2	27:43	7.5	31.3%	0.0%	62.5%	8.5	2.0	1.5	1.0
Kenneth Chien	2	26:04	12.5	43.5%	50.0%	50.0%	2.5	2.0	1.0	0.0
Wang Lu-Hsiang	1	20:51	1.0	0.0%	0.0%	50.0%	2.0	0.0	0.0	0.0
Chang Keng-Yu	Did not play									
Samuel Manu	2	37:01	13.0	32.0%	25.0%	66.7%	3.5	0.5	0.0	1.0
Su Yi-Chin	1	14:29	4.0	33.3%	0.0%	100.0%	5.0	1.0	0.0	0.0
Micheal Eric	1	19:42	6.0	60.0%	0.0%	0.0%	7.0	1.0	0.0	1.0
Tsao Xun-Xiang	1	4:34	2.0	33.3%	0.0%	0.0%	2.0	1.0	1.0	0.0
Chen Kuan-Chuan	2	13:30	0.0	0.0%	0.0%	0.0%	2.5	0.0	0.0	0.0

=== Semifinals ===
Player	GP	MPG	PPG	FG%	3P%	FT%	RPG	APG	SPG	BPG
Ray McCallum	2	36:19	10.5	27.6%	20.0%	75.0%	6.0	5.5	2.0	0.0
Ting Sheng-Ju	4	20:23	8.0	36.7%	55.6%	62.5%	1.0	2.3	0.3	0.0
Chiang Chun	3	11:27	5.0	50.0%	50.0%	60.0%	1.0	0.7	1.0	0.0
Chen Wen-Hung	4	20:29	7.3	52.4%	35.7%	50.0%	3.3	0.8	0.8	0.0
Chang Chao-Chen	1	1:32	0.0	0.0%	0.0%	0.0%	2.0	0.0	0.0	0.0
Huang Tsung-Han	2	9:51	2.5	20.0%	14.3%	0.0%	0.5	0.0	0.0	0.0
Lin Yi-Huei	Did not play									
Malcolm Miller	4	28:55	8.5	35.7%	28.6%	83.3%	7.5	1.0	1.0	0.8
Adrien Moerman	3	31:54	20.7	40.0%	35.0%	95.8%	8.0	3.0	0.7	0.0
Kenneth Chien	4	28:43	9.3	36.8%	40.0%	50.0%	2.8	1.5	1.3	0.3
Wang Lu-Hsiang	1	2:18	0.0	0.0%	0.0%	0.0%	0.0	0.0	0.0	0.0
Chang Keng-Yu	Did not play									
Samuel Manu	4	33:02	13.8	40.4%	42.9%	61.5%	4.5	2.0	1.5	0.0
Su Yi-Chin	3	13:50	3.7	44.4%	50.0%	0.0%	1.3	1.3	1.0	0.0
Micheal Eric	3	27:43	11.7	46.7%	0.0%	77.8%	9.0	1.0	0.3	0.3
Tsao Xun-Xiang	4	15:30	7.5	50.0%	42.9%	60.0%	1.3	2.8	1.0	0.0
Chen Kuan-Chuan	2	10:22	1.0	25.0%	0.0%	0.0%	2.0	0.0	0.5	0.0

- Reference：

== Transactions ==
On April 3, 2025, Jeantal Cylla was not registered in the 2024–25 TPBL season final rosters.

=== Overview ===
Players added

Via draft

- Chiang Chun
- Samuel Manu

Via free agency

- Chen Kuan-Chuan
- Kenneth Chien
- Jeantal Cylla
- Micheal Eric
- Rahlir Hollis-Jefferson
- Ray McCallum
- Malcolm Miller
- Adrien Moerman
- Byron Mullens
- Devin Oliver
- Thomas Robinson
- Su Yi-Chin
- Wang Lu-Hsiang
- Ihor Zaytsev
Players lost

Via free agency

- Rahlir Hollis-Jefferson
- Hsu Ching-En
- Jaylen Johnson
- Vladyslav Koreniuk
- Lin Li
- Lin Ping-Sheng
- Liu Yen-Ting
- Youssou Ndoye
- Sun Szu-Yao

Waived

- Rahlir Hollis-Jefferson
- Byron Mullens
- Devin Oliver
- Thomas Robinson
- Ihor Zaytsev

=== Free agency ===
==== Additions ====
Date	Player	Contract terms	Former team	Ref.
July 5, 2024	Chen Kuan-Chuan	—N/a	(Taiwan) Kaohsiung 17LIVE Steelers	
July 12, 2024	Su Yi-Chin	—N/a	(Taiwan) Tainan TSG GhostHawks	
July 25, 2024	Samuel Manu	—N/a	(United States) UC Davis	
July 31, 2024	Kenneth Chien	—N/a	(Taiwan) Formosa Dreamers	
August 1, 2024	Wang Lu-Hsiang	—N/a	(Taiwan) Kaohsiung 17LIVE Steelers	
August 2, 2024	Chiang Chun	—N/a	(Taiwan) FJU	
August 3, 2024	Devin Oliver	—N/a	(Japan) Yokohama B-Corsairs	
August 26, 2024	Ihor Zaytsev	—N/a	(Taiwan) Taipei Fubon Braves	
August 30, 2024	Byron Mullens	—N/a	(Canada) Winnipeg Sea Bears	
September 7, 2024	Malcolm Miller	—N/a	(Italy) Unione Cestistica Casalpusterlengo	
November 8, 2024	Ray McCallum	—N/a	(Greece) ASK Karditsas B.C.	
November 8, 2024	Micheal Eric	—N/a	(Libya) Al Ahli Tripoli	
November 30, 2024	Thomas Robinson	—N/a	(Mexico) Astros de Jalisco	
December 23, 2024	Rahlir Hollis-Jefferson	—N/a	(Taiwan) Taipei Mars	
January 22, 2025	Adrien Moerman	—N/a	(Russia) Zenit Saint Petersburg	
March 20, 2025	Jeantal Cylla	—N/a	(Mongolia) Selenge Bodons	

==== Subtractions ====
Date	Player	Reason	New team	Ref.
May 28, 2024	Jaylen Johnson	Contract expired	(United States) Bivouac	
June 9, 2024	Youssou Ndoye	Contract expired	(China) Shijiazhuang Xianglan	
July 2, 2024	Lin Ping-Sheng	Execute to go overseas	(China) Zhejiang Lions	
July 19, 2024	Lin Li	Contract expired	(Taiwan) Changhua BLL	
July 19, 2024	Liu Yen-Ting	Contract expired	(Taiwan) Kaohsiung 17LIVE Steelers	
August 9, 2024	Hsu Ching-En	Contract expired	—N/a	
September 7, 2024	Rahlir Hollis-Jefferson	Contract expired	(Taiwan) Taipei Taishin Mars	
September 7, 2024	Vladyslav Koreniuk	Contract expired	(China) Nanjing Monkey Kings	
November 5, 2024	Byron Mullens	Contract terminated	(Mongolia) BCH Knights	
November 19, 2024	Ihor Zaytsev	Contract terminated	—N/a	
November 20, 2024	Sun Szu-Yao	Mutual agreement	(Japan) Kanazawa Samuraiz	
November 27, 2024	Devin Oliver	Contract terminated	(France) SLUC Nancy Basket	
January 21, 2025	Thomas Robinson	Contract terminated	(Colombia) Paisas Basketball	
March 16, 2025	Rahlir Hollis-Jefferson	Contract terminated	(Finland) Kataja	

== Awards ==
=== Yearly awards ===
Recipient	Award	Ref.
Malcolm Miller	All-Defensive Second Team	
Samuel Manu	All-Defensive Second Team	
Samuel Manu	Rookie of the Year	
Aviva	Most Popular Cheerleader of the Year	

=== Player of the Week ===
Week	Recipient	Award	Ref.
19	Malcolm Miller	Week 19 Player of the Week	
