= 2024–25 Taoyuan Taiwan Beer Leopards season =

Taiwanese professional basketball season

- President: Liu Chin-Liang
- Head Coach: Charles Dubé-Brais
- Arena: Taoyuan Arena

TPBL results
- Record: 16–20 (44.4%)
- Place: 5th
- Playoffs finish: Play-in (lost to Mars, 1–2)

Player records
- Points: Lasan Kromah 23.3
- Rebounds: Devin Williams 12.7
- Assists: Gao Jin-Wei 6.4

The 2024–25 Taoyuan Taiwan Beer Leopards season was the franchise's fourth season, its first season in the Taiwan Professional Basketball League (TPBL).

The Leopards were coached by Charles Dubé-Brais in his second year as their head coach.

== Draft ==
Round	Pick	Player	Position(s)	School / club team
1	3	Wang Jhe-Yu	Forward	NTUST
2	9	Chuang Po-Yuan	Guard	FJU

- Reference：

On July 12, 2023, the Leopards' 2024 first-round pick and Huang Tsung-Han were traded to Taipei Taishin basketball team in exchange for 2023 first-round 2nd pick.

On July 20, 2024, the Leopards acquired Yang Shen-Yen and 2024 first-round pick from Formosa Dreamers in exchange for cash considerations.

== Roster ==
2024–25 Taoyuan Taiwan Beer Leopards roster
Players
Coaches

Pos.	No.	Nat.	Name	Ht.	Wt.	Age	From
PG	5	(Taiwan)	Gao Jin-Wei	1.77 m (5 ft 10 in)	66 kg (146 lb)	24 – 23 October 2000	UCH
SF	6	(France)	Axel Toupane (I)	2.01 m (6 ft 7 in)	101 kg (223 lb)	32 – 23 July 1992	France
SG	8	(Taiwan)	Wang Jhe-Yu	1.90 m (6 ft 3 in)	88 kg (194 lb)	23 – 18 March 2002	NTUST
F	10	(Taiwan)	Ting Kuang-Hao	1.92 m (6 ft 4 in)	86 kg (190 lb)	24 – 23 October 2000	UCH
G	11	(Taiwan)	Chuang Po-Yuan	1.85 m (6 ft 1 in)	85 kg (187 lb)	24 – 1 December 2000	FJU
F	12	(Taiwan)	Lin Sin-Kuan	1.92 m (6 ft 4 in)	97 kg (214 lb)	23 – 9 May 2002	NTNU
SF	24	(Liberia) (United States)	Lasan Kromah (I)	1.98 m (6 ft 6 in)	91 kg (201 lb)	33 – 24 June 1991	UConn
SF	27	(Taiwan)	Huang Jhen (C)	1.93 m (6 ft 4 in)	86 kg (190 lb)	34 – 27 June 1990	FJU
F	28	(Taiwan)	Chen Chun-Han	1.96 m (6 ft 5 in)	90 kg (198 lb)	28 – 20 March 1997	UKN
SF	31	(Taiwan)	Tung Yung-Chuan	1.90 m (6 ft 3 in)	92 kg (203 lb)	25 – 14 October 1999	NTNU
F	33	(Taiwan)	Wang Hao-Chi	1.95 m (6 ft 5 in)	95 kg (209 lb)	35 – 22 September 1989	HWU
PF	41	(United States)	Devin Williams (I)	2.06 m (6 ft 9 in)	122 kg (269 lb)	30 – 31 May 1994	West Virginia
C	55	(Lithuania)	Egidijus Mockevičius (I)	2.08 m (6 ft 10 in)	108 kg (238 lb)	32 – 1 September 1992	Evansville
PG	72	(Taiwan)	Lu Chi-Erh	1.87 m (6 ft 2 in)	80 kg (176 lb)	33 – 15 January 1992	NKNU
C	82	(Taiwan)	Liu Yuan-Kai	2.06 m (6 ft 9 in)	105 kg (231 lb)	33 – 9 July 1991	FJU

Head coach

- (Canada) Charles Dubé-Brais

Assistant coach(es)

- (Philippines) (Canada) Jeffrey Dosado
- (Canada) Vincent Plante

Strength & conditioning coach(es)

- (Taiwan) Chen Tzu-Yi
- (Taiwan) Chen Ting-Wei

Athletic trainer(s)

- (Taiwan) Chen Wei-Chih
- (Taiwan) Cheng Po-Wei

Legend

- (C) Team captain
- (I) Import player
- Injured

- Roster
Updated: May 23, 2025

== Summer League ==
Lin Meng-Hsueh and Chen Chun-Han joined to the team in these summer league games.

=== Game log ===
Recap

August 25, 2024
14:00 (UTC+8)

Hsinchu Toplus Lioneers	84–66	Taoyuan Taiwan Beer Leopards

CTBC administration building basketball court, Taipei City

Recap

August 29, 2024
14:00 (UTC+8)

Taoyuan Taiwan Beer Leopards	61–72	Taipei Taishin Mars

CTBC administration building basketball court, Taipei City

Recap

September 3, 2024
14:00 (UTC+8)

Taoyuan Taiwan Beer Leopards	64–91	New Taipei CTBC DEA

CTBC administration building basketball court, Taipei City

Recap

September 10, 2024
14:00 (UTC+8)

New Taipei CTBC DEA	75–79	Taoyuan Taiwan Beer Leopards

CTBC administration building basketball court, Taipei City

Recap

September 12, 2024
14:00 (UTC+8)

Taipei Taishin Mars	73–63	Taoyuan Taiwan Beer Leopards

CTBC administration building basketball court, Taipei City

== Kumamoto & Taiwan Friendship Match 2024 ==
Recap

September 7, 2024
15:00 (UTC+9)

Taoyuan Taiwan Beer Leopards	56–80	Kumamoto Volters

Kumamoto Prefectural Gymnasium, Kumamoto

== Preseason ==
=== Game log ===
2024 preseason game log
Total: 2–0 (home: 0–0; road: 2–0)
Preseason : 2–0 (home: 0–0; road: 2–0)

Game	Date	Team	Score	High points	High rebounds	High assists	Location Attendance	Record
1	October 5	@ Mars	W 92–90	Lasan Kromah (40)	Ting Kuang-Hao (13); Larry Sanders (13)	Lasan Kromah (7)	Taichung Intercontinental Basketball Stadium; 2,100	1–0
2	October 13	@ Lioneers	W 99–98	Gao Jin-Wei (33)	Robert Upshaw (10)	Gao Jin-Wei (10)	Hsinchu County Stadium; 3,668	2–0

Color： Win Lose
Schedule

== Regular season ==
=== Standings ===
Pos	Team	Pld	W	L	PCT	GB	Qualification
1	New Taipei Kings	36	26	10	.722	—	Advance to semifinals
2	Formosa Dreamers	36	21	15	.583	5	Advance to semifinals
3	Kaohsiung Aquas	36	19	17	.528	7	Advance to semifinals
4	Taipei Taishin Mars	36	16	20	.444	10	Advance to play-in
5	Taoyuan Taiwan Beer Leopards	36	16	20	.444	10	Advance to play-in
6	New Taipei CTBC DEA	36	16	20	.444	10	
7	Hsinchu Toplus Lioneers	36	12	24	.333	14	

Source: TPBL

=== Game log ===
2024–25 regular season game log
Total: 16–20 (home: 9–9; road: 7–11)
October : 0–1 (home: 0–0; road: 0–1)

Game	Date	Team	Score	High points	High rebounds	High assists	Location Attendance	Record
1	October 27	@ Aquas	L 87–88	Lasan Kromah (29)	Devin Williams (10)	Gao Jin-Wei (6)	Kaohsiung Arena; 3,588	0–1

November : 2–1 (home: 1–0; road: 1–1)

Game	Date	Team	Score	High points	High rebounds	High assists	Location Attendance	Record
2	November 3	@ Mars	W 82–78	Gao Jin-Wei (19); Lin Sin-Kuan (19)	Devin Williams (13)	Gao Jin-Wei (8)	Taipei Heping Basketball Gymnasium; 3,259	1–1
3	November 9	@ Lioneers	L 73–99	Lasan Kromah (21)	Devin Williams (17)	Gao Jin-Wei (8)	Hsinchu County Stadium; 5,721	1–2
4	November 30	Dreamers	W 92–90	Lasan Kromah (25)	Devin Williams (12)	Gao Jin-Wei (5)	Taoyuan Arena; 5,205	2–2

December : 3–5 (home: 1–3; road: 2–2)

Game	Date	Team	Score	High points	High rebounds	High assists	Location Attendance	Record
5	December 1	Aquas	L 94–106 (OT)	Gao Jin-Wei (24)	Devin Williams (12)	Lasan Kromah (8)	Taoyuan Arena; 4,227	2–3
6	December 4	Lioneers	W 112–89	Lasan Kromah (34)	Devin Williams (11)	Lasan Kromah (7)	Taoyuan Arena; 2,138	3–3
7	December 7	DEA	L 86–87 (OT)	Gao Jin-Wei (24)	Devin Williams (23)	Gao Jin-Wei (7)	Taoyuan Arena; 5,041	3–4
8	December 8	Mars	L 74–95	Gao Jin-Wei (18); Devin Williams (18)	Devin Williams (15)	Gao Jin-Wei (5)	Taoyuan Arena; 4,678	3–5
9	December 14	@ Aquas	L 87–95	Lasan Kromah (19); Devin Williams (19)	Devin Williams (15)	Gao Jin-Wei (9)	Kaohsiung Arena; 4,062	3–6
10	December 20	@ Aquas	L 95–105	Lasan Kromah (29)	Devin Williams (10)	Lasan Kromah (7)	Kaohsiung Arena; 2,912	3–7
11	December 22	@ DEA	W 88–70	Lasan Kromah (30)	Lasan Kromah (11); Devin Williams (11)	Gao Jin-Wei (8)	Xinzhuang Gymnasium; 3,814	4–7
12	December 29	@ Lioneers	W 106–102	Lasan Kromah (29)	Egidijus Mockevičius (16)	Lasan Kromah (8)	Hsinchu County Stadium; 4,017	5–7

January : 1–2 (home: 0–0; road: 1–2)

Game	Date	Team	Score	High points	High rebounds	High assists	Location Attendance	Record
13	January 4	@ Dreamers	W 117–111 (OT)	Lasan Kromah (38)	Devin Williams (15)	Gao Jin-Wei (9)	Taichung Intercontinental Basketball Stadium; 2,417	6–7
14	January 10	@ Mars	L 85–97	Lin Sin-Kuan (21)	Devin Williams (14)	Gao Jin-Wei (6)	Taipei Heping Basketball Gymnasium; 2,942	6–8
15	January 12	@ Dreamers	L 102–110	Lasan Kromah (35)	Egidijus Mockevičius (12)	Lasan Kromah (8)	Taichung Intercontinental Basketball Stadium; 2,048	6–9

February : 2–1 (home: 2–1; road: 0–0)

Game	Date	Team	Score	High points	High rebounds	High assists	Location Attendance	Record
16	February 8	Kings	W 100–84	Lasan Kromah (26)	Devin Williams (18)	Gao Jin-Wei (7)	Taoyuan Arena; 6,869	7–9
17	February 9	Dreamers	W 96–93	Lasan Kromah (33)	Egidijus Mockevičius (21)	Gao Jin-Wei (9)	Taoyuan Arena; 4,758	8–9
18	February 26	Kings	L 99–102	Lin Sin-Kuan (24)	Egidijus Mockevičius (15)	Gao Jin-Wei (11)	Taoyuan Arena; 3,989	8–10

March : 1–5 (home: 1–1; road: 0–4)

Game	Date	Team	Score	High points	High rebounds	High assists	Location Attendance	Record
19	March 1	Lioneers	W 98–82	Lin Sin-Kuan (21)	Egidijus Mockevičius (17)	Gao Jin-Wei (9)	Taoyuan Arena; 5,531	9–10
20	March 2	DEA	L 106–116	Gao Jin-Wei (24)	Devin Williams (11)	Gao Jin-Wei (10)	Taoyuan Arena; 5,019	9–11
21	March 8	@ DEA	L 89–93	Gao Jin-Wei (25)	Devin Williams (11)	Lasan Kromah (6)	Xinzhuang Gymnasium; 3,481	9–12
22	March 12	@ Lioneers	L 77–94	Devin Williams (24)	Devin Williams (15)	Lasan Kromah (8)	Hsinchu County Stadium; 3,078	9–13
23	March 23	@ Kings	L 97–108	Lasan Kromah (26)	Devin Williams (14)	Gao Jin-Wei (6); Lasan Kromah (6)	Xinzhuang Gymnasium; 3,823	9–14
24	March 29	@ Mars	L 88–97	Gao Jin-Wei (20)	Egidijus Mockevičius (20)	Lasan Kromah (6)	Taipei Heping Basketball Gymnasium; 5,568	9–15

April : 5–4 (home: 4–4; road: 1–0)

Game	Date	Team	Score	High points	High rebounds	High assists	Location Attendance	Record
25	April 4	Mars	W 100–97	Lin Sin-Kuan (25)	Egidijus Mockevičius (16)	Lasan Kromah (6)	Taoyuan Arena; 4,838	10–15
26	April 11	Aquas	W 107–103	Lasan Kromah (32)	Egidijus Mockevičius (10)	Lasan Kromah (7)	Taoyuan Arena; 3,813	11–15
27	April 13	@ Kings	W 87–68	Lasan Kromah (27)	Devin Williams (16)	Lasan Kromah (7)	Xinzhuang Gymnasium; 4,537	12–15
28	April 19	Lioneers	W 95–83	Lasan Kromah (18)	Egidijus Mockevičius (20)	Gao Jin-Wei (7)	Taoyuan Arena; 6,218	13–15
29	April 20	Aquas	L 75–103	Gao Jin-Wei (19)	Egidijus Mockevičius (14)	Gao Jin-Wei (6)	Taoyuan Arena; 5,322	13–16
30	April 23	Kings	L 109–114	Gao Jin-Wei (30)	Devin Williams (15)	Gao Jin-Wei (8)	Taoyuan Arena; 4,205	13–17
31	April 26	Dreamers	L 95–110	Devin Williams (23)	Egidijus Mockevičius (12)	Gao Jin-Wei (7)	Taoyuan Arena; 6,124	13–18
32	April 27	Mars	L 86–89	Lasan Kromah (25)	Devin Williams (16)	Gao Jin-Wei (7)	Taoyuan Arena; 5,738	13–19
33	April 29	DEA	W 85–77	Lasan Kromah (24)	Devin Williams (14)	Gao Jin-Wei (7); Lasan Kromah (7)	Taoyuan Arena; 3,064	14–19

May : 2–1 (home: 0–0; road: 2–1)

Game	Date	Team	Score	High points	High rebounds	High assists	Location Attendance	Record
—	May 7	@ Kings	Rescheduled to May 8					
34	May 8	@ Kings	L 84–117	Devin Williams (23)	Egidijus Mockevičius (13)	Lasan Kromah (6)	Xinzhuang Gymnasium; 3,073	14–20
35	May 10	@ DEA	W 95–76	Lasan Kromah (31)	Egidijus Mockevičius (14)	Lasan Kromah (9)	Xinzhuang Gymnasium; 3,965	15–20
36	May 18	@ Dreamers	W 104–85	Devin Williams (25)	Egidijus Mockevičius (14)	Lasan Kromah (15)	Taichung Intercontinental Basketball Stadium; 2,368	16–20

Color： Win Lose Rescheduled
Schedule

=== Regular season note ===
- Due to the 2025 Basketball Champions League Asia – East, the TPBL declared that the game on May 7 would be rescheduled to May 8.

== Playoffs ==
=== Game log ===
2025 playoffs game log
Total: 1–1 (home: 1–0; road: 0–1)
Play-in : 1–1 (home: 1–0; road: 0–1)

Game	Date	Team	Score	High points	High rebounds	High assists	Location Attendance	Series
1	May 23	Mars	W 113–68	Gao Jin-Wei (20)	Devin Williams (12)	Gao Jin-Wei (10)	Taoyuan Arena; 3,813	1–1
2	May 25	@ Mars	L 84–86	Lasan Kromah (28)	Devin Williams (14)	Gao Jin-Wei (6)	Hsinchu County Stadium; 2,288	1–2

Color： Win Lose
Schedule

=== Play-in note ===
- The fourth seed, Taipei Taishin Mars, was awarded a one-win advantage before the play-in series.

== Player statistics ==
Legend
GP	Games played	MPG	Minutes per game	FG%	Field goal percentage
3P%	3-point field goal percentage	FT%	Free throw percentage	RPG	Rebounds per game
APG	Assists per game	SPG	Steals per game	BPG	Blocks per game
PPG	Points per game		Led the league

=== Regular season ===
Player	GP	MPG	PPG	FG%	3P%	FT%	RPG	APG	SPG	BPG
Mitchell Smith^{≠‡}	5	20:42	6.8	31.7%	25.0%	83.3%	6.4	2.2	0.4	1.6
Lu Zong-Lin^{≠‡}	5	9:39	0.6	14.3%	0.0%	50.0%	1.4	1.4	0.2	0.0
Earnest Ross^{≠‡}	5	23:53	10.2	33.3%	34.8%	69.2%	6.0	2.6	0.6	0.0
Larry Sanders^{‡}	1	20:20	6.0	60.0%	0.0%	0.0%	6.0	1.0	1.0	1.0
Gao Jin-Wei	35	40:01	16.7	40.6%	37.8%	78.6%	5.0	6.4	1.5	0.1
Axel Toupane^{≠}	8	26:11	13.0	30.6%	25.0%	70.3%	6.3	3.3	1.4	0.1
Wang Jhe-Yu	16	2:09	0.5	17.6%	16.7%	0.0%	0.4	0.2	0.1	0.0
Ting Kuang-Hao	33	16:53	2.3	23.5%	17.8%	50.0%	1.5	0.6	1.0	0.1
Chuang Po-Yuan	25	3:48	0.9	24.0%	25.0%	55.6%	0.2	0.1	0.2	0.1
Lin Sin-Kuan	33	35:21	12.4	34.5%	28.0%	54.3%	4.1	2.3	1.5	0.2
Lasan Kromah	32	39:04	23.3	45.2%	27.6%	69.8%	7.6	5.9	2.8	0.6
Huang Jhen	36	17:53	4.3	31.5%	29.4%	83.3%	1.7	1.2	0.9	0.1
Chen Chun-Han	16	1:37	0.0	0.0%	0.0%	0.0%	0.4	0.1	0.0	0.1
Tung Yung-Chuan	19	18:35	4.7	38.8%	32.7%	85.7%	2.2	0.7	0.6	0.1
Wang Hao-Chi	30	22:19	5.7	39.2%	36.1%	64.3%	2.3	0.8	0.3	0.2
Devin Williams	30	34:42	18.3	50.2%	42.6%	61.3%	12.7	1.2	1.2	0.2
Egidijus Mockevičius	20	28:59	11.8	59.2%	35.7%	59.6%	13.8	0.9	0.8	1.1
Robert Upshaw^{‡}	6	20:22	10.0	46.5%	44.4%	64.0%	3.8	0.2	0.5	1.2
Lu Chi-Erh	Did not play									
Liu Yuan-Kai	31	8:46	1.5	41.0%	14.3%	70.0%	1.4	0.2	0.1	0.2

^{‡} Left during the season
^{≠} Acquired during the season

=== Play-in ===
Player	GP	MPG	PPG	FG%	3P%	FT%	RPG	APG	SPG	BPG
Gao Jin-Wei	2	36:40	16.0	42.3%	40.0%	100.0%	4.5	8.0	0.5	0.5
Axel Toupane	2	18:44	6.0	33.3%	16.7%	100.0%	6.0	3.5	0.0	1.0
Wang Jhe-Yu	1	8:25	5.0	66.7%	50.0%	0.0%	0.0	0.0	0.0	0.0
Ting Kuang-Hao	2	14:39	4.0	42.9%	0.0%	100.0%	4.0	1.0	0.0	0.5
Chuang Po-Yuan	1	9:20	6.0	33.3%	50.0%	0.0%	0.0	0.0	0.0	0.0
Lin Sin-Kuan	2	32:59	10.5	47.1%	42.9%	100.0%	3.5	1.5	1.0	0.0
Lasan Kromah	2	35:13	22.0	43.8%	53.3%	72.7%	6.0	4.5	4.5	1.5
Huang Jhen	1	14:36	3.0	33.3%	50.0%	0.0%	1.0	0.0	2.0	1.0
Chen Chun-Han	1	6:32	0.0	0.0%	0.0%	0.0%	1.0	0.0	1.0	0.0
Tung Yung-Chuan	2	26:12	12.0	61.5%	66.7%	100.0%	1.5	0.5	0.5	0.5
Wang Hao-Chi	2	16:58	2.0	12.5%	0.0%	66.7%	3.0	0.5	0.0	0.0
Devin Williams	2	30:41	14.5	45.5%	28.6%	70.0%	13.0	1.0	0.5	0.5
Egidijus Mockevičius	Did not play									
Lu Chi-Erh	Did not play									
Liu Yuan-Kai	2	8:25	4.5	75.0%	0.0%	75.0%	2.0	0.0	0.5	0.0

- Reference：

== Transactions ==
=== Overview ===
Players added

Via draft

- Chuang Po-Yuan
- Wang Jhe-Yu

Via trade

- Ting Kuang-Hao
- Yang Shen-Yen

Via free agency

- Chen Chun-Han
- Derek King
- Lin Meng-Hsueh
- Lu Chi-Erh
- Egidijus Mockevičius
- Earnest Ross
- Larry Sanders
- Mitchell Smith
- Axel Toupane
- Robert Upshaw

Transfer from Taiwan Beer

- Lu Zong-Lin
- Tung Yung-Chuan
- Wang Hao-Chi
Players lost

Via trade

- Lin Meng-Hsueh

Via free agency

- Chiang Yu-An
- DeMarcus Cousins
- Lee Chi-Wei
- DeAndre Williams

Waived

- Derek King
- Earnest Ross
- Larry Sanders
- Mitchell Smith
- Robert Upshaw

Transfer to Taiwan Beer

- Joof Alasan
- Chen Hsiao-Jung
- Cheng Wei
- Chu I-Tsung
- Lu Chieh-Min
- Lu Zong-Lin
- Wu Pei-Chia

Out on loan

- Yang Shen-Yen

=== Trades ===
Date	Trade		Ref.
July 8, 2024	To Taiwan Beer Leopards: Ting Kuang-Hao	To Formosa Dreamers: Cash considerations	
July 20, 2024	To Taoyuan Taiwan Beer Leopards: Yang Shen-Yen; 2024 Dreamers' first-round pick	To Formosa Dreamers: Cash considerations	
December 2, 2024	To Taoyuan Taiwan Beer Leopards: Cash considerations	To New Taipei CTBC DEA: Lin Meng-Hsueh	

=== Transfer from Taiwan Beer ===
Date	Player	Ref.
July 31, 2024	Wang Hao-Chi	
July 31, 2024	Tung Yung-Chuan	
November 27, 2024	Lu Zong-Lin	

=== Transfer to Taiwan Beer ===
Date	Player	Ref.
August 12, 2024	Chen Hsiao-Jung	
August 12, 2024	Cheng Wei	
August 12, 2024	Lu Chieh-Min	
August 22, 2024	Chu I-Tsung	
August 22, 2024	Wu Pei-Chia	
December 11, 2024	Joof Alasan	
December 11, 2024	Lu Zong-Lin	

=== Out on loan ===
Date	Player	Loan team	Loan season	Ref.
December 11, 2024	Yang Shen-Yen	Changhua BLL	2025 Super Basketball League	

=== Free agency ===
==== Re-signed ====
Date	Player	Contract terms	Ref.
August 9, 2024	Lasan Kromah	—N/a	
August 9, 2024	Devin Williams	—N/a	
August 21, 2024	Huang Jhen	—N/a	
August 21, 2024	Liu Yuan-Kai	—N/a	

==== Additions ====
Date	Player	Contract terms	Former team	Ref.
July 5, 2024	Lu Chi-Erh	—N/a	(Taiwan) Tainan TSG GhostHawks	
August 7, 2024	Wang Jhe-Yu	—N/a	(Taiwan) NTUST	
August 7, 2024	Chuang Po-Yuan	—N/a	(Taiwan) FJU	
August 19, 2024	Larry Sanders	—N/a	(United States) Ball Hogs	
August 31, 2024	Robert Upshaw	—N/a	(United States) Seattle Super Hawks	
September 26, 2024	Lin Meng-Hsueh	—N/a	(Taiwan) Taipei Fubon Braves	
September 27, 2024	Chen Chun-Han	—N/a	Bank of Taiwan	
September 30, 2024	Derek King	—N/a	(Hong Kong) VantaBlack Dragons	
December 6, 2024	Mitchell Smith	—N/a	(Greece) ASK Karditsas B.C.	
December 21, 2024	Egidijus Mockevičius	—N/a	(Mexico) El Calor de Cancún	
January 21, 2025	Earnest Ross	—N/a	(Mongolia) SG Apes	
March 22, 2025	Axel Toupane	—N/a	(Lebanon) Homenetmen Beirut	

==== Subtractions ====
Date	Player	Reason	New team	Ref.
June 19, 2024	DeMarcus Cousins	Contract expired	Taiwan Mustangs	
June 28, 2024	Lee Chi-Wei	Contract expired	(Taiwan) Hsinchu Toplus Lioneers	
June 30, 2024	Chiang Yu-An	Contract expired	(Taiwan) Formosa Dreamers	
July 25, 2024	DeAndre Williams	Contract expired	(Azerbaijan) Sabah BC	
October 28, 2024	Derek King	Contract terminated	3-year suspension by Taiwan	
October 30, 2024	Larry Sanders	Contract terminated	(Dominican Republic) Club Sameji	
December 19, 2024	Robert Upshaw	Contract terminated	(United States) Salem Capitals	
January 13, 2025	Mitchell Smith	Contract terminated	(Bulgaria) Balkan Botevgrad	
March 21, 2025	Earnest Ross	Contract terminated	(Australia) Sunshine Coast Phoenix	

== Awards ==
=== Yearly awards ===
Recipient	Award	Ref.
Lasan Kromah	Points Leader	
Lasan Kromah	Steals Leader	
Lasan Kromah	All-Defensive Second Team	
Lasan Kromah	All-TPBL First Team	
Devin Williams	Rebounds Leader	
Gao Jin-Wei	Assists Leader	
Gao Jin-Wei	Most Popular Player of the Year	
Gao Jin-Wei	Block of the Year	
Gao Jin-Wei	All-Defensive First Team	
Gao Jin-Wei	All-TPBL First Team	

=== Player of the Week ===
Week	Recipient	Award	Ref.
10	Lasan Kromah	Week 10 Player of the Week	
14	Lasan Kromah	Week 14 Player of the Week	
21	Lasan Kromah	Week 21 Player of the Week	
26	Lasan Kromah	Week 26 Player of the Week	

=== Player of the Month ===
Month	Recipient	Award	Ref.
December	Gao Jin-Wei	December Player of the Month (local)	
January & February	Gao Jin-Wei	January & February Player of the Month (local)	
May	Lasan Kromah	May Player of the Month (import)	
