= Tevin Mack =

American basketball player (born 1996)

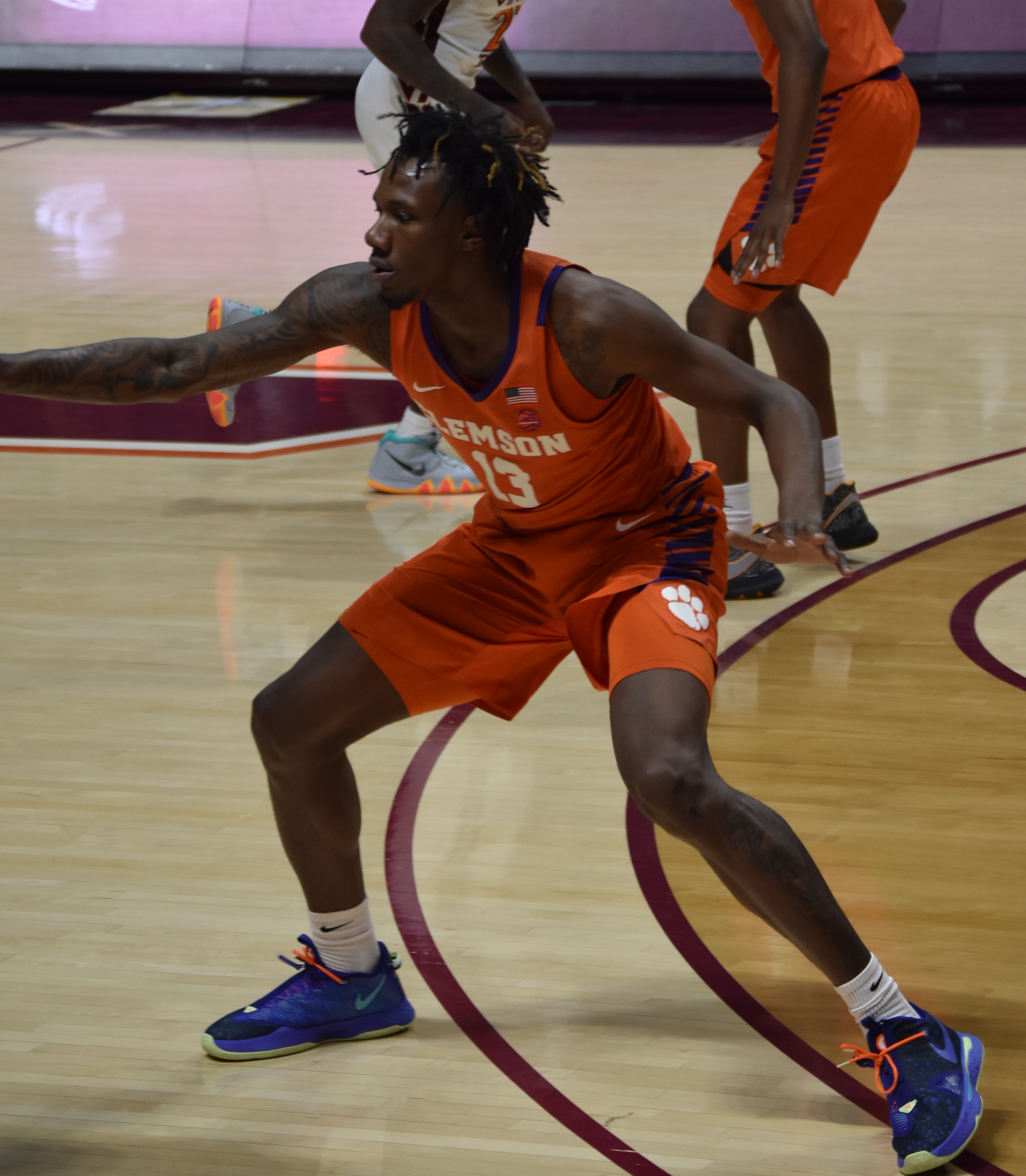
- Mack with Clemson in 2020

No. 1 – Victoria Libertas Pesaro
- Position: Small forward
- League: Serie A2

Personal information
- Born: May 1, 1997 (age 29) Columbia, South Carolina, U.S.
- Listed height: 6 ft 7 in (2.01 m)
- Listed weight: 227 lb (103 kg)

Career information
- High school: Dreher (Columbia, South Carolina)
- College: Texas (2015–2017); Alabama (2018–2019); Clemson (2019–2020)
- NBA draft: 2020: undrafted
- Playing career: 2021–present

Career history
- 2021: Prishtina
- 2021–2022: Orlandina
- 2023: Sporting CP
- 2023: Apollon Patras
- 2023: Tianjin Pioneers
- 2023–2024: Karditsa
- 2024: Al Ahli Tripoli
- 2024–2025: New Taipei CTBC DEA
- 2025: Al-Ittihad Jeddah
- 2025: Start Lublin
- 2025–2026: Kolossos Rodou
- 2026–present: Victoria Libertas Pesaro

Career highlights
- Polish Supercup MVP (2025); Polish Supercup winner (2025)
Medals
Men's basketball
Representing United States
Summer Universiade
Gold medal – first place	2019 Italy	Team competition

Tevin Stanvontae Mack (born May 1, 1997) is an American professional basketball player for Victoria Libertas Pesaro of the Italian Serie A2. He played college basketball for the Texas Longhorns, Alabama Crimson Tide, and Clemson Tigers.

== Early life ==
Mack grew up in Columbia, South Carolina and began playing basketball at the age of three. He attended Dreher High School. He initially committed to VCU over offers from Clemson, South Carolina, UConn, and Georgia. When VCU coach Shaka Smart accepted the job at Texas, Mack followed him there.

== College career ==
Mack averaged 5.1 points and 2.0 rebounds per game as a freshman at Texas, helping the team reach the NCAA Tournament. As a sophomore, he averaged 14.8 points and 4.8 rebounds per game before being suspended indefinitely for violating team rules in January 2017. Following the season, Mack transferred to Alabama. He averaged 9.0 points and 3.3 rebounds per game. Mack transferred to Clemson for his redshirt senior season, partially to be closer to his mother. On January 28, 2020, he scored a career-high 32 points in a 71-70 win against Syracuse. As a senior, Mack finished second on the team in scoring and rebounding with 12.2 points and 5.2 rebounds per game.

== Professional career ==
On January 31, 2021, Mack signed with KB Prishtina in the Kosovo Basketball Superleague. He averaged 24.5 points, 4.0 rebounds and 2.4 assists per game. On July 29, he signed with Orlandina Basket of the Serie A2 Basket.

On February 4, 2023, he joined Apollon Patras of the Greek Basket League. On March 25, 2023, Mack scored 27 points in a huge win over local rivals Promitheas Patras. In a total of 5 league games, he averaged 18.8 points (shooting with 45% from the 3-point line) and 2.8 rebounds, playing around 29 minutes per contest.

After a stint in the Chinese Basketball Association, Mack returned to Greece for Karditsa on December 16, 2023.

On October 3, 2024, Mack was announced to have signed with Libyan champions Al Ahli Tripoli, ahead of their participation in the Road to BAL. On December 12, he signed with the New Taipei CTBC DEA of the Taiwan Professional Basketball League (TPBL). On January 24, 2025, his contract was terminated. March 11, he signed with the Al-Ittihad Jeddah of the Saudi Basketball League (SBL).

On August 31, 2025, he signed with Start Lublin of the Polish Basketball League (PLK). On December 10 of the same year, Mack returned to Greece for Kolossos Rodou.

== National team career ==
Mack was a part of the Clemson team chosen to represent the United States in the 2019 Summer Universiade in Italy. The U.S. received a gold medal after defeating Ukraine in the title game, and Mack averaged 9.5 points and four rebounds per game.
