= Chevez Goodwin =

American basketball player (born 1998)

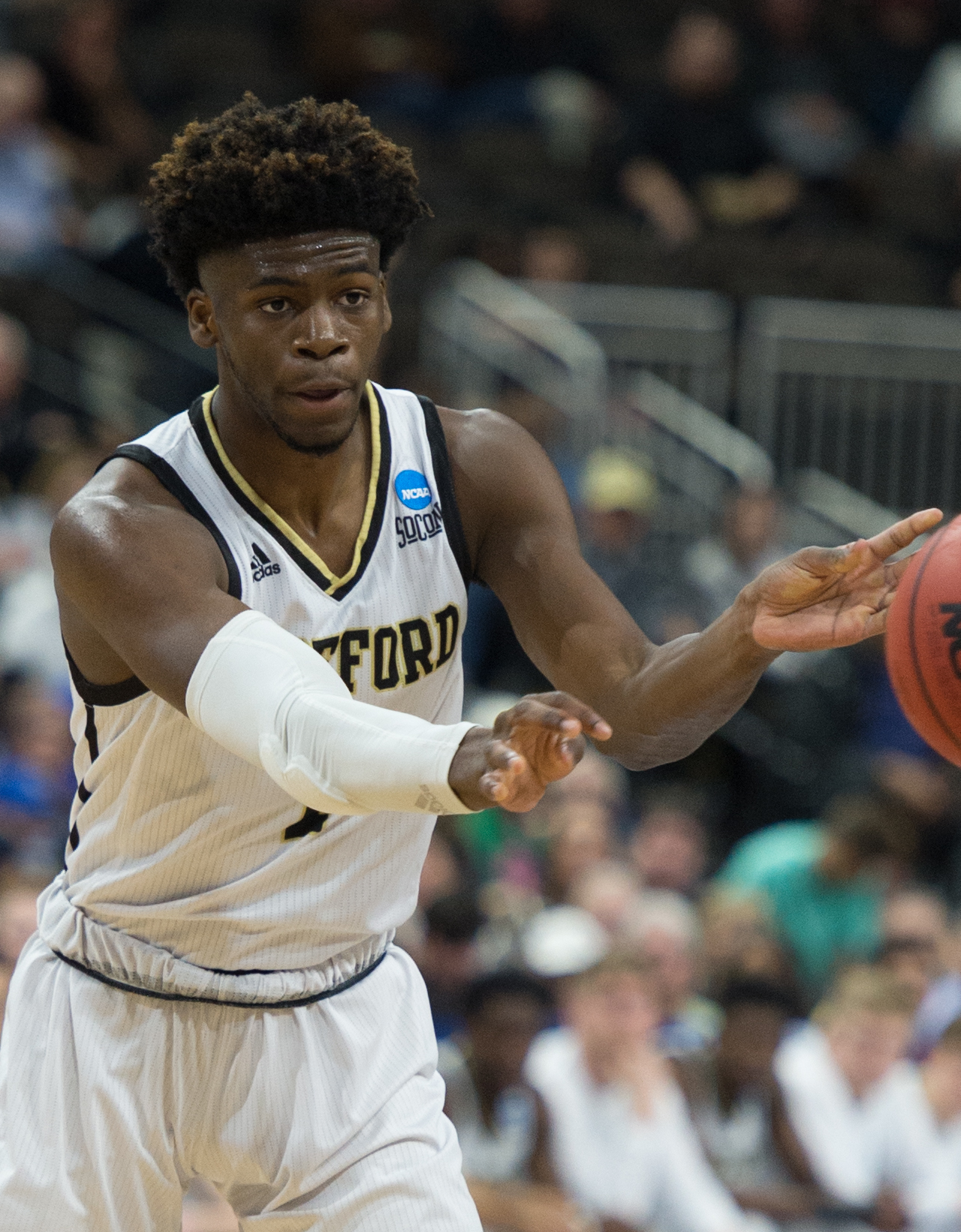
- Goodwin with Wofford in 2019

No. 1 – Szolnoki Olajbányász
- Position: Center / power forward
- League: Nemzeti Bajnokság I/A; Europe Cup

Personal information
- Born: February 27, 1998 (age 28) Columbia, South Carolina, U.S.
- Listed height: 6 ft 9 in (2.06 m)
- Listed weight: 225 lb (102 kg)

Career information
- High school: A. C. Flora (Columbia, South Carolina); Hammond School (Columbia, South Carolina)
- College: College of Charleston (2016–2017); Wofford (2018–2020); USC (2020–2022)
- NBA draft: 2022: undrafted
- Playing career: 2022–present

Career history
- 2022–2023: Aris Thessaloniki
- 2023–2024: Rostock Seawolves
- 2024: New Taipei CTBC DEA
- 2024–2025: Força Lleida
- 2025–2026: Kolossos Rodou
- 2026–present: Szolnoki Olajbányász

Career highlights
- Greek All-Star Game Slam Dunk champion (2022); Greek League All-Star (2022)

Chevez Brandford Goodwin (born February 27, 1998) is an American professional basketball player for Szolnoki Olajbányász of the Nemzeti Bajnokság I/A. He played college basketball with the USC Trojans of the Pac-12 Conference, as well as for the College of Charleston Cougars and the Wofford Terriers.

== High school career ==
Goodwin began his high school career at A. C. Flora High School in Columbia, South Carolina. For his sophomore season, he transferred to Hammond School in Columbia. As a junior, Goodwin helped lead his team to the SCISA 3A state championship. In his senior season, he averaged 18.9 points, 12.4 rebounds and 1.3 blocks, and shared The State Midlands Player of the Year honors with his teammate Seventh Woods.

== College career ==
As a freshman at the College of Charleston, Goodwin averaged 2.3 points and 2.9 rebounds per game off the bench. For his sophomore season, he transferred to Wofford, and averaged 4.3 points and 4.3 rebounds per game after sitting out for a year as a redshirt due to transfer rules. He helped get the Terriers to the NCAA tournament and win the first NCAA tournament game in school history over Seton Hall. On February 5, 2020, Goodwin scored a career-high 27 points in a 79–73 win against VMI. In his junior season, he averaged 11.9 points and 6.2 rebounds per game. Goodwin then moved to USC as a graduate transfer, choosing the Trojans over offers from Arkansas, Georgia, Houston and Xavier. As a senior, he averaged 5.6 points and 3.5 rebounds per game off the bench. Goodwin returned to USC for his additional year of eligibility, granted by the NCAA due to the COVID-19 pandemic. In his last year at USC he started every game averaging 11 points and 6.4 rebounds while helping lead the Trojans back to the NCAA tournament for a second year in a row.

== Professional career ==
On August 3, 2022, Goodwin signed his first professional contract overseas with Greek club Aris Thessaloniki. In 22 domestic league matches, he averaged 12.1 points and 7.8 rebounds, playing around 23 minutes per contest. During his time with club he won the 2022 Greek Slam Dunk Contest and was named an All-Star in the league as a rookie.

In the 2023/2024 season, the American center played 30 BBL games for the Rostock Seawolves, averaging 12.4 points and 6.5 rebounds. With 2.9 offensive rebounds per game, he ranked second in the league. On November 25, 2023, against Göttingen, Goodwin set a team record with ten offensive rebounds in a single game.

On August 1, 2024, Goodwin signed with the New Taipei CTBC DEA of the Taiwan Professional Basketball League (TPBL). On November 4, his contract was terminated. On December 6, he joined the Força Lleida of the Liga ACB. On February 12, 2025, he parted ways with the team. On February 17, he signed with the Kolossos Rodou of the Greek Basketball League (GBL).

On August 4, 2026, he signed with Szolnoki Olajbányász of the Nemzeti Bajnokság I/A.

== Career statistics ==
Legend
GP	Games played	GS	Games started	MPG	Minutes per game
FG%	Field goal percentage	3P%	3-point field goal percentage	FT%	Free throw percentage
RPG	Rebounds per game	APG	Assists per game	SPG	Steals per game
BPG	Blocks per game	PPG	Points per game	**Bold**	Career high

=== College ===
Year	Team	GP	GS	MPG	FG%	3P%	FT%	RPG	APG	SPG	BPG	PPG
2016–17	College of Charleston	**35**	5	9.8	.515	.000	.379	2.9	.1	.2	.5	2.3
2017–18	Wofford	Redshirt										
2018–19	Wofford	**35**	0	13.3	.585	–	.333	4.3	.2	.2	.3	4.3
2019–20	Wofford	**35**	**35**	21.8	**.642**	.000	.512	6.2	**.9**	.3	**1.1**	**11.9**
2020–21	USC	33	1	14.9	.538	.000	**.534**	3.5	.5	.3	.3	5.6
2021–22	USC	34	34	**24.5**	.570	.000	.471	**6.4**	.6	**.4**	.5	11.0
Career		172	75	16.8	.585	.000	.474	4.7	.5	.3	.6	7.0

== Personal life ==
Goodwin's father, Charles, played college football for South Carolina State. Since high school, Goodwin has worn the No. 1 basketball jersey to honor his mother, Ronee Berry-Goodwin, who died when he was three years old.

== See also ==
- List of NCAA Division I men's basketball career games played leaders
