= Beau Beech =

American basketball player (born 1994)

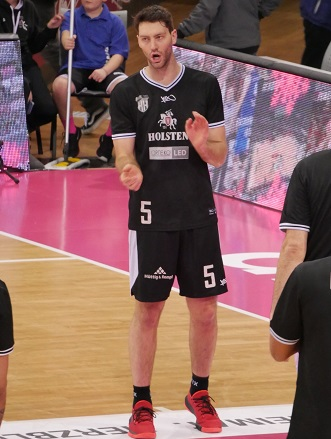
- Beech with Hamburg Towers in 2019.

No. 22 – Zastal Zielona Góra
- Position: Small forward / power forward
- League: Polish Basketball League

Personal information
- Born: March 1, 1994 (age 32)
- Listed height: 6 ft 8 in (2.03 m)
- Listed weight: 209 lb (95 kg)

Career information
- High school: Ponte Vedra (Ponte Vedra Beach, Florida)
- College: North Florida (2012–2016)
- NBA draft: 2016: undrafted
- Playing career: 2016–present

Career history
- 2016–2017: Long Island Nets
- 2018: Erie BayHawks
- 2018–2020: Hamburg Towers
- 2020–2021: PAOK Thessaloniki
- 2021–2022: Czarni Słupsk
- 2022–2023: FMP
- 2023–2024: Yenisey
- 2024–2025: Formosa Dreamers
- 2025: Zadar
- 2025–2026: New Taipei CTBC DEA
- 2026–present: Zastal Zielona Góra

Career highlights
- ProA champion (2019); 2× First-team All-Atlantic Sun (2015, 2016); Atlantic Sun All-Freshmen Team (2013)
- Stats at Basketball Reference

Lewis Henry Beech III (born March 1, 1994) is an American professional basketball player for the Zastal Zielona Góra of the Polish Basketball League. He played college basketball for the North Florida Ospreys.

== High school career ==
Beech attended Ponte Vedra High School in Ponte Vedra Beach, Florida. As a senior, he averaged 24 points, 10 rebounds, 3 assists, 2 blocks and 3 steals, leading the Sharks to a district title and regional semifinal appearance while garnering first-team All-State honors.

== College career ==
After graduating high school, Beech joined North Florida where he started in 129 of 133 games while averaging 11.7 points, 5.1 rebounds, 1.4 assists and 1.1 steals in 28.7 minutes per game, all of this while shooting .423 from the field and .393 from three-point range. As a freshman, he was named to the Atlantic Sun All-Freshman Team and as a junior and senior made All-Atlantic Sun First Team. He ended his career first in school history in games played, starts and steals with 147 and tied for first in three-pointers made with 302.

== Professional career ==
After going undrafted in the 2016 NBA draft, Beech joined the Brooklyn Nets for the 2016 NBA Summer League. On August 5, 2016, he signed with the Nets, but was waived on October 18 after appearing in one preseason game. On November 1, he was acquired by the Long Island Nets of the NBA Development League as an affiliate player of the Nets.

On August 23, 2017, Beech was selected by the Erie BayHawks in the NBA G League expansion draft. He was formally signed by the BayHawks on January 18, 2018. In August 2018, Beech signed with the Hamburg Towers of the German Pro A league.

On August 2, 2020, Beech signed with PAOK Thessaloniki of the Greek Basket League. He averaged 6.6 points and 4.5 rebounds per game in 22 games. On July 7, 2021, Beech signed with Czarni Słupsk of the Polish Basketball League.

On July 7, 2022, Beech signed a contract with Serbian team FMP.

On September 10, 2024, Beech signed with the Formosa Dreamers of the Taiwan Professional Basketball League (TPBL).

On September 19, 2025, Beech signed with Zadar of the Croatian League. On December 20, the Zadar announced that Beech left the team. On December 22, Beech signed with the New Taipei CTBC DEA of the Taiwan Professional Basketball League (TPBL).

On September 8, 2026, Beech signed with the Zastal Zielona Góra of the Polish Basketball League.

== Personal life ==
Beau is the son of Bud and Joanne Beech and has one younger brother, Spencer, and two younger sisters, Olivia and Eve. His father is the head basketball coach and dean of students at Ponte Vedra High. Beech was a 6'6" shooting guard when he began his career at UNF.
