= Conner Frankamp =

American basketball player (born 1995)

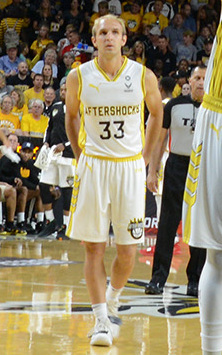
- Frankamp during The Basketball Tournament 2019

Free Agent
- Position: Point guard

Personal information
- Born: July 16, 1995 (age 31) Wichita, Kansas, U.S.
- Listed height: 6 ft 1 in (1.85 m)
- Listed weight: 169 lb (77 kg)

Career information
- High school: Wichita North (Wichita, Kansas)
- College: Kansas (2013–2014); Wichita State (2015–2018)
- NBA draft: 2018: undrafted
- Playing career: 2018–present

Career history
- 2018–2019: Beroe
- 2019–2020: Rethymno Cretan Kings
- 2020–2021: Murcia
- 2021–2022: Zenit Saint Petersburg
- 2022: Promitheas Patras
- 2022: CSP Limoges
- 2022–2023: Gaziantep Basketbol
- 2023: Breogán
- 2024: Palencia
- 2024–2025: New Taipei CTBC DEA
- 2025–2026: Start Lublin

Career highlights
- Greek League Top Scorer (2020); Greek All-Star (2020); Balkan League steals leader (2019); Third-team All-MVC (2017); MVC tournament MVP (2017); First-team Parade All-American (2013)
Medals
Men's basketball
Representing United States
U17 World Championship
Gold medal – first place	2012 Lithuania	Under-17
Under-16 Americas Championship
Gold medal – first place	2011 Mexico	Under-16

Conner Michael Frankamp (born July 16, 1995) is an American-Georgian professional basketball player who last played for Start Lublin of the Polish Basketball League (PLK). He played college basketball for the Kansas Jayhawks and Wichita State. He was named to the third team all-Missouri Valley Conference as a junior, averaging 9 points and 3 assists per game. Frankamp entered the 2018 NBA draft but was not selected in the draft's two rounds.

== High school career ==
Frankamp played for Wichita North High School in Wichita, Kansas under coach Gary Squires. During high school, he was a four-star recruit who was ranked No. 46 in the ESPN 100 and No. 34 on Rivals’ Class of 2013 list. As a senior at Wichita North, he averaged 31.1 points, 3.8 assists, 3.5 rebounds and 2.5 steals per game and, for the second-straight year, was tabbed as one of Kansas’ top five players for all classifications by The Wichita Eagle.

== College career ==
Frankamp played for one season for the Kansas Jayhawks and for three seasons with Wichita State. During his first college year with Kansas, Frankamp was a bench player, averaging 2.6 points per game. The next year, he transferred to Wichita State. During his tenure with the team, Frankamp was named to the Third team All-Missouri Valley Conference as a junior and was the Missouri Valley Conference MVP the same year. As a senior, he averaged 10.6 points and 2.2 assists per game with the Shockers.

== Professional career ==
=== Beroe ===
After going undrafted at the 2018 NBA draft, Frankamp joined Beroe of the NBL, He went on to average 19.3 points and 4.3 assists per game.

=== Rethymno Cretan Kings ===
The following year, Frankamp was added to the Los Angeles Lakers Summer League roster but only appeared in three games and was not offered a contract by the team. Later this season, he joined Rethymno Cretan Kings of the Greek Basket League. During the season, Frankamp played in the Greek League All-Star game and competed in the three point contest. (20.8 points and 4.1 assists per game).

=== Murcia ===
On June 9, 2020, Frankamp signed with UCAM Murcia of the Liga ACB. He scored 24 points in a 93–80 win against Movistar Estudiantes on September 24.

=== Zenit Saint Petersburg ===
On June 21, 2021, Frankamp officially signed with Russian club Zenit Saint Petersburg of the VTB United League and the EuroLeague.

He left the team after the 2022 Russian invasion of Ukraine.

=== Promitheas Patras ===
On April 8, 2022, Frankamp returned to Greece, signing with Promitheas Patras. On May 13 of the same year, he abruptly parted ways with the club, just before the start of the Greek Basket League playoffs. In only 8 games, Frankamp averaged 13.3 points, 1.7 rebounds, 1.7 assists and 1 steal, playing around 27 minutes per contest.

=== Limoges ===
On May 18, 2022, he has signed with CSP Limoges of the LNB Pro A.

=== Gaziantep Basketbol ===
On July 14, 2022, he signed with Gaziantep Basketbol of the Basketbol Süper Ligi and the FIBA Europe Cup.

=== AfterShocks ===
Frankamp has played for the AfterShocks, a team of Wichita State alumni, competing in The Basketball Tournament (TBT), an annual single-elimination bracket tournament.

=== Río Breogán ===
On October 8, 2023, Connor Frankamp signed with CB Breogán of the Liga ACB and the Basketball Champions League.

=== New Taipei CTBC DEA ===
On November 4, 2024, Frankamp signed with the New Taipei CTBC DEA of the Taiwan Professional Basketball League (TPBL). On January 17, 2025, New Taipei CTBC DEA terminated the contract relationship with Frankamp.

=== Start Lublin ===
On December 14, 2025, he signed with Start Lublin of the Polish Basketball League (PLK).

== National team career ==
Frankamp played with the junior youth national teams of the United States. With the USA, he played at the 2011 FIBA Under-16 Americas Championship, where he won a gold medal. He also played with the USA junior national team at the 2012 FIBA Under-17 World Championship, where he also won a gold medal.

Frankamp later gained Georgian citizenship, in order to become a member of the senior men's Georgian national team.

== Career statistics ==
=== Domestic Leagues ===
==== Regular season ====
Legend
GP	Games played	MPG	Minutes per game	FG%	Field goal percentage
3P%	3-point field goal percentage	FT%	Free throw percentage	RPG	Rebounds per game
APG	Assists per game	SPG	Steals per game	BPG	Blocks per game
PPG	Points per game	**Bold**	Career high		Led the league

Note: Only games in the primary domestic competitions are included. Therefore, games in cup or European competitions are left out.

Year	Team	League	GP	MPG	FG%	3P%	FT%	RPG	APG	SPG	BPG	PPG
2018–19	Beroe	NBL	30	28.1	.520	.486	.848	2.6	4.2	1.3	.1	19.3
