= 2025 TPBL finals =

Taiwanese basketball championship

Team	Coach	Wins
New Taipei Kings	Ryan Marchand	4
Kaohsiung Aquas	Mathias Fischer	3
- Dates: June 16 – 29, 2025
- MVP: Jeremy Lin (New Taipei Kings)

The 2025 TPBL finals was the championship series of the Taiwan Professional Basketball League (TPBL)'s 2024–25 season and conclusion of the season's playoffs. The best-of-seven final series was played by the winners of the semifinals series. The finals series started on June 16 and ended on June 29. The series was matched by New Taipei Kings and Kaohsiung Aquas. On June 29, the New Taipei Kings defeated the Kaohsiung Aquas, 4–3, winning the 2024–25 season championship. Jeremy Lin of the New Taipei Kings was named the Finals MVP.

== Bracket ==
Play-in
4	**Taipei Taishin Mars**	**2**
5	Taoyuan Taiwan Beer Leopards	1

Semifinals
1	**New Taipei Kings**	**4**
4	Taipei Taishin Mars	0
2	Formosa Dreamers	1
3	**Kaohsiung Aquas**	**4**

Finals
1	**New Taipei Kings**	**4**
3	Kaohsiung Aquas	3

Bold: Series winner
Italic: Team with home-court advantage

== Background ==
=== Road to the finals ===
New Taipei Kings (1st seed)		Kaohsiung Aquas (3rd seed)
Team / GP / W / L / PCT / GB; **New Taipei Kings** / 36 / 26 / 10 / .722 / —; Formosa Dreamers / 36 / 21 / 15 / .583 / 5.0; Kaohsiung Aquas / 36 / 19 / 17 / .528 / 7.0; Taipei Taishin Mars / 36 / 16 / 20 / .444 / 10.0; Taoyuan Taiwan Beer Leopards / 36 / 16 / 20 / .444 / 10.0; New Taipei CTBC DEA / 36 / 16 / 20 / .444 / 10.0; Hsinchu Toplus Lioneers / 36 / 12 / 24 / .333 / 14.0	Regular season	Team / GP / W / L / PCT / GB; New Taipei Kings / 36 / 26 / 10 / .722 / —; Formosa Dreamers / 36 / 21 / 15 / .583 / 5.0; **Kaohsiung Aquas** / 36 / 19 / 17 / .528 / 7.0; Taipei Taishin Mars / 36 / 16 / 20 / .444 / 10.0; Taoyuan Taiwan Beer Leopards / 36 / 16 / 20 / .444 / 10.0; New Taipei CTBC DEA / 36 / 16 / 20 / .444 / 10.0; Hsinchu Toplus Lioneers / 36 / 12 / 24 / .333 / 14.0
No need to play play-in series	Play-in	No need to play play-in series
Defeated the 4th seed Taipei Taishin Mars, 4–0	Semifinals	Defeated the 2nd seed Formosa Dreamers, 4–1

=== Regular season series ===
The Kings won 5–1 in the regular-season series.

October 19, 2024

boxscore

**New Taipei Kings**	**88**–78	Kaohsiung Aquas

Kaohsiung Arena, Kaohsiung City

December 15, 2024

boxscore

**New Taipei Kings**	**107**–78	Kaohsiung Aquas

Kaohsiung Arena, Kaohsiung City

December 28, 2024

boxscore

Kaohsiung Aquas	108–**111**	**New Taipei Kings**

Xinzhuang Gymnasium, New Taipei City

April 2, 2025

boxscore

Kaohsiung Aquas	91–**111**	**New Taipei Kings**

Xinzhuang Gymnasium, New Taipei City

April 5, 2025

boxscore

Kaohsiung Aquas	92–**106**	**New Taipei Kings**

Xinzhuang Gymnasium, New Taipei City

April 26, 2025

boxscore

New Taipei Kings	83–**97**	**Kaohsiung Aquas**

Kaohsiung Arena, Kaohsiung City

== Series summary ==
Game	Date	Away team	Result	Home team
Game 1	June 16	Kaohsiung Aquas	89–**100** (0–1)	**New Taipei Kings**
Game 2	June 18	**Kaohsiung Aquas**	**99**–91 (1–1)	New Taipei Kings
Game 3	June 21	**New Taipei Kings**	**104**–99 (2–1)	Kaohsiung Aquas
Game 4	June 23	New Taipei Kings	99–**117** (2–2)	**Kaohsiung Aquas**
Game 5	June 25	Kaohsiung Aquas	83–**93** (2–3)	**New Taipei Kings**
Game 6	June 27	New Taipei Kings	109–**112** (OT) (3–3)	**Kaohsiung Aquas**
Game 7	June 29	Kaohsiung Aquas	89–**108** (3–4)	**New Taipei Kings**

== Game summaries ==
=== Game 1 ===
VL Sports
Sportcast
AXN Asia

June 16, 2025
19:00 (UTC+8)

boxscore

Kaohsiung Aquas	89–**100**	**New Taipei Kings**
Scoring by quarter: 19–**21**, 18–**29**, **29**–24, 23–**26**
Pts: Sword 23; Rebs: Wesson 12; Asts: Wesson 7		Pts: Manigault, Washburn 22; Rebs: Manigault 21; Asts: Manigault 6
**Kings leads series, 1–0**

Xinzhuang Gymnasium, New Taipei City
Attendance: 6,800
Referees: Yu Jung, Hsieh Wen-Wei, Hsieh Shang-Chien

=== Game 2 ===
VL Sports
Sportcast
AXN Asia

June 18, 2025
19:00 (UTC+8)

boxscore

**Kaohsiung Aquas**	**99**–91	New Taipei Kings
Scoring by quarter: 12–**31**, **29**–21, **31**–19, **27**–20
Pts: Sword, Želionis 17; Rebs: Wesson 16; Asts: Wesson 5		Pts: Je. Lin 21; Rebs: Manigault 9 Asts: Manigault 8
**Series tied, 1–1**

Xinzhuang Gymnasium, New Taipei City
Attendance: 6,800
Referees: Chen Hung-Ming, Sung Ming-Lu, Huang Chen-Feng

=== Game 3 ===
MOMOTV
VL Sports
Sportcast
AXN Asia

June 21, 2025
17:00 (UTC+8)

boxscore

**New Taipei Kings**	**104**–99	Kaohsiung Aquas
Scoring by quarter: 26–26, **25**–24, 16–**22**, **37**–27
Pts: Je. Lin 26; Rebs: Sakakini 9 Asts: Je. Lin 9		Pts: Sword 26; Rebs: Želionis 12; Asts: Yu Huan-Ya 7
**Kings leads series, 2–1**

Kaohsiung Arena, Kaohsiung City
Attendance: 12,000
Referees: Chen Chao-Hung, Yeh Chun-Hung, Chen Chien-Lin

=== Game 4 ===
VL Sports
Sportcast
AXN Asia

June 23, 2025
19:00 (UTC+8)

boxscore

New Taipei Kings	99–**117**	**Kaohsiung Aquas**
Scoring by quarter: 27–**30**, 24–**33**, 26–**28**, 22–**26**
Pts: Washburn 20; Rebs: Sakakini 10; Asts: Je. Lin 10		Pts: Želionis 25; Rebs: Želionis 8 Asts: Yu Huan-Ya 8
**Series tied, 2–2**

Kaohsiung Arena, Kaohsiung City
Attendance: 10,142
Referees: Lin Chien-Hung, Lo Kuo-Hsien, Lai Chien-Hao

=== Game 5 ===
VL Sports
Sportcast
AXN Asia

June 25, 2025
19:00 (UTC+8)

boxscore

Kaohsiung Aquas	83–**93**	**New Taipei Kings**
Scoring by quarter: **23**–17, 13–**27**, 16–**22**, **31**–27
Pts: Želionis, Sword 17; Rebs: Želionis 14; Asts: Sword 4		Pts: Je. Lin 29; Rebs: Daye 11; Asts: Lee Kai-Yan 6
**Kings leads series, 3–2**

Xinzhuang Gymnasium, New Taipei City
Attendance: 6,800
Referees: Yu Jung, Chen Chao-Hung, Sung Ming-Lu

=== Game 6 ===
VL Sports
Sportcast
AXN Asia

June 27, 2025
19:00 (UTC+8)

boxscore

New Taipei Kings	109–**112** (OT)	**Kaohsiung Aquas**
Scoring by quarter: **30**–26, 18–**24**, 31–31, **20**–18, Overtime: 10–**13**
Pts: Je. Lin 26; Rebs: Manigault 9 Asts: Je. Lin 8		Pts: Sword 26; Rebs: Wesson 9 Asts: Sword 9
**Series tied, 3–3**

Kaohsiung Arena, Kaohsiung City
Attendance: 12,000
Referees: Chen Hung-Ming, Lin Chien-Hung, Lo Kuo-Hsien

=== Game 7 ===
VL Sports
Sportcast
AXN Asia

June 29, 2025
17:00 (UTC+8)

boxscore

Kaohsiung Aquas	89–**108**	**New Taipei Kings**
Scoring by quarter: 18–**35**, 20–**26**, **30**–21, 21–**26**
Pts: Wesson 25; Rebs: Wesson 12; Asts: Chen Huai-An 8		Pts: Je. Lin 27; Rebs: Daye, Washburn 14; Asts: three players 4
**Kings wins TPBL finals, 4–3**

Xinzhuang Gymnasium, New Taipei City
Attendance: 6,800
Referees: Yu Jung, Yeh Chun-Hung, Lai Chien-Hao

== Rosters ==
=== New Taipei Kings ===
2024–25 New Taipei Kings roster
Players
Coaches

Pos.	No.	Nat.	Name	Ht.	Wt.	Age	From
G	1	(United States) (Taiwan)	Joseph Lin **(HP)**	1.85 m (6 ft 1 in)	73 kg (161 lb)	33 – 21 June 1992	Hamilton
G	2	(Taiwan)	Su Pei-Kai	1.87 m (6 ft 2 in)	83 kg (183 lb)	25 – 2 November 1999	NTUA
F	3	(Taiwan)	Chen Chun-Nan	1.90 m (6 ft 3 in)	90 kg (198 lb)	25 – 20 April 2000	NTSU
G	7	(United States) (Taiwan)	Jeremy Lin **(HP)**	1.92 m (6 ft 4 in)	95 kg (209 lb)	36 – 23 August 1988	Harvard
G	9	(Taiwan)	Lee Kai-Yan	1.82 m (6 ft 0 in)	80 kg (176 lb)	32 – 6 May 1993	HWU
G	10	(Taiwan)	Chien You-Che	1.80 m (5 ft 11 in)	80 kg (176 lb)	29 – 10 September 1995	UCH
C	11	(Taiwan)	Wang Po-Chih	1.95 m (6 ft 5 in)	130 kg (287 lb)	28 – 29 October 1996	NTSU
F	13	(Taiwan)	Lu Cheng-Ju	1.94 m (6 ft 4 in)	93 kg (205 lb)	39 – 13 April 1986	TPEC
F	17	(Taiwan)	Su Shih-Hsuan	1.97 m (6 ft 6 in)	95 kg (209 lb)	29 – 9 April 1996	NTNU
F	19	(Taiwan)	Lin Chin-Pang **(C)**	1.90 m (6 ft 3 in)	90 kg (198 lb)	40 – 15 June 1985	MU
G	24	(Taiwan)	Hung Chih-Shan	1.76 m (5 ft 9 in)	75 kg (165 lb)	39 – 5 July 1985	NTUT
F	25	(United States)	Austin Daye **(I)**	2.07 m (6 ft 9 in)	91 kg (201 lb)	37 – 5 June 1988	Gonzaga
F	31	(Palestine)	Sani Sakakini **(AI)**	2.04 m (6 ft 8 in)	102 kg (225 lb)	36 – 19 August 1988	JUST
C	42	(United States) (Bulgaria)	Jason Washburn **(I)**	2.13 m (7 ft 0 in)	111 kg (245 lb)	35 – 5 June 1990	Utah
F	55	(United States)	Kenny Manigault **(I)**	1.96 m (6 ft 5 in)	95 kg (209 lb)	34 – 22 May 1991	Pikeville
G	72	(Taiwan)	Lin Li-Jen	1.83 m (6 ft 0 in)	85 kg (187 lb)	35 – 16 June 1990	MDU

Head coach

- (United States) Ryan Marchand

Assistant coach(es)

- (Taiwan) Lin Cheng-Yu
- (Australia) (United States) Thomas Wisman
- (United States) Mark Coppola

Strength & conditioning coach(es)

- (Taiwan) Chang Chung-Hsi
- (Taiwan) Liu Cheng-Yu

Athletic trainer(s)

- (Taiwan) Chiu Po-Kai
- (Taiwan) Wu Chung-Hao

Team manager

- (Taiwan) Hung Chih-Hu

Legend

- **(C)** Team captain
- **(I)** Import player
- **(HP)** Heritage player
- **(AI)** Asian import player
- Injured

- Roster
Updated: June 1, 2025

=== Kaohsiung Aquas ===
2024–25 Kaohsiung Aquas roster
Players
Coaches

Pos.	No.	Nat.	Name	Ht.	Wt.	Age	From
PG	0	(Taiwan) (Vietnam)	Wei Liang-Che	1.85 m (6 ft 1 in)	78 kg (172 lb)	23 – 28 November 2001	NKNU
PF	1	(Lithuania)	Edgaras Želionis **(I)**	2.08 m (6 ft 10 in)	100 kg (220 lb)	36 – 4 June 1989	Lithuania
G	3	(United States)	Craig Sword **(I)**	1.91 m (6 ft 3 in)	89 kg (196 lb)	31 – 16 January 1994	Mississippi State
SG	7	(Taiwan)	Yu Huan-Ya	1.82 m (6 ft 0 in)	81 kg (179 lb)	31 – 30 November 1993	NTNU
SG	8	(Taiwan)	Chiu Tzu-Hsuan	1.90 m (6 ft 3 in)	89 kg (196 lb)	25 – 8 December 1999	ISU
PF	10	(Taiwan)	Hu Long-Mao	1.96 m (6 ft 5 in)	101 kg (223 lb)	32 – 22 December 1992	Chaminade
SF	11	(Taiwan)	Tang Wei-Chieh	1.92 m (6 ft 4 in)	89 kg (196 lb)	25 – 25 September 1999	VMI
SF	12	(Taiwan)	Lin Jen-Hung	1.94 m (6 ft 4 in)	88 kg (194 lb)	31 – 18 December 1993	NTNU
PF	18	(Taiwan)	Wu I-Ping	2.00 m (6 ft 7 in)	92 kg (203 lb)	32 – 29 August 1992	ISU
C	21	(Taiwan)	Lu Wei-Ting	2.01 m (6 ft 7 in)	103 kg (227 lb)	28 – 16 April 1997	ISU
PF	22	(United States) (Italy)	Anthony Morse **(I)**	2.04 m (6 ft 8 in)	104 kg (229 lb)	31 – 13 April 1994	Tennessee Tech
SG	24	(Taiwan)	Su Wen-Ju	1.87 m (6 ft 2 in)	78 kg (172 lb)	27 – 16 October 1997	ISU
SG	28	(Taiwan)	Yu Chun-An **(C)**	1.89 m (6 ft 2 in)	83 kg (183 lb)	33 – 13 February 1992	NTNU
C	34	(United States)	Kaleb Wesson **(I)**	2.08 m (6 ft 10 in)	110 kg (243 lb)	25 – 27 July 1999	Ohio State
SF	57	(Taiwan)	Wu Siao-Jin	1.90 m (6 ft 3 in)	81 kg (179 lb)	29 – 28 August 1995	NKNU
PG	66	(Taiwan)	Chen Huai-An	1.86 m (6 ft 1 in)	86 kg (190 lb)	28 – 29 April 1997	NTUA
C	85	(Taiwan)	Chin Ming-Ching	1.95 m (6 ft 5 in)	106 kg (234 lb)	30 – 14 November 1994	NTNU

Head coach

- (Germany) Mathias Fischer

Assistant coach(es)

- (Taiwan) Zhu Yong-Hong
- (Taiwan) Peng Te-Hsuan
- (Taiwan) Liao Che-Yi

Athletic trainer(s)

- (Taiwan) Liao Hsuan-Yi

Team manager

- (Taiwan) Chu Li-Fu

Legend

- **(C)** Team captain
- **(I)** Import player
- Injured

- Roster
Updated: May 29, 2025

== Player statistics ==
Legend
GP	Games played	MPG	Minutes per game	FG%	Field goal percentage
3P%	3-point field goal percentage	FT%	Free throw percentage	RPG	Rebounds per game
APG	Assists per game	SPG	Steals per game	BPG	Blocks per game
PPG	Points per game		Finals MVP

=== New Taipei Kings ===
Player	GP	MPG	PPG	FG%	3P%	FT%	RPG	APG	SPG	BPG
Joseph Lin	7	35:47	10.3	46.9%	28.0%	55.6%	2.7	3.6	1.6	0.0
Su Pei-Kai	Did not play									
Chen Chun-Nan	Did not play									
Jeremy Lin	7	37:05	22.4	38.1%	34.9%	83.3%	5.4	6.0	1.9	0.9
Lee Kai-Yan	7	31:19	8.1	40.8%	41.4%	62.5%	2.7	2.3	0.9	0.1
Chien You-Che	7	10:05	2.4	29.4%	23.1%	100.0%	0.9	0.3	0.4	0.0
Wang Po-Chih	2	3:59	0.0	0.0%	0.0%	0.0%	0.5	0.5	0.0	0.0
Lu Cheng-Ju	5	2:30	2.2	60.0%	60.0%	66.7%	0.4	0.2	0.2	0.0
Su Shih-Hsuan	7	18:16	4.9	52.0%	18.2%	60.0%	3.1	1.3	0.4	0.7
Lin Chin-Pang	6	3:46	1.0	66.7%	100.0%	33.3%	1.0	0.5	0.0	0.0
Hung Chih-Shan	6	12:08	1.5	27.3%	27.3%	0.0%	0.7	1.5	0.0	0.0
Austin Daye	5	30:38	15.8	50.0%	47.1%	77.8%	9.4	1.4	1.8	0.8
Sani Sakakini	4	30:50	14.5	42.9%	22.2%	90.9%	8.8	1.5	1.3	0.3
Jason Washburn	5	31:57	19.0	64.9%	25.0%	69.0%	7.6	0.8	0.4	1.0
Kenny Manigault	7	32:05	15.6	44.7%	40.0%	65.8%	9.4	3.6	2.3	0.4
Lin Li-Jen	Did not play									

=== Kaohsiung Aquas ===
Player	GP	MPG	PPG	FG%	3P%	FT%	RPG	APG	SPG	BPG
Wei Liang-Che	Did not play									
Edgaras Želionis	6	30:22	18.2	47.5%	32.3%	71.9%	9.0	2.2	1.0	0.7
Craig Sword	7	34:09	21.3	50.5%	36.4%	81.4%	5.7	4.1	1.7	0.7
Yu Huan-Ya	7	26:42	7.3	34.0%	30.6%	75.0%	1.1	3.9	1.1	0.0
Chiu Tzu-Hsuan	7	23:20	4.9	29.5%	17.4%	66.7%	3.1	2.3	1.4	0.3
Hu Long-Mao	7	30:14	11.7	51.9%	50.0%	75.0%	3.0	1.7	0.6	0.4
Tang Wei-Chieh	2	1:40	0.0	0.0%	0.0%	0.0%	0.5	0.0	0.0	0.0
Lin Jen-Hung	2	2:52	0.0	0.0%	0.0%	0.0%	0.0	0.0	0.0	0.0
Wu I-Ping	Did not play									
Lu Wei-Ting	4	4:21	1.3	25.0%	16.7%	0.0%	1.0	0.0	0.0	0.3
Anthony Morse	3	27:45	9.7	50.0%	50.0%	50.0%	5.3	1.0	0.7	0.0
Su Wen-Ju	7	30:59	9.9	37.3%	48.4%	100.0%	2.9	1.3	1.7	0.1
Yu Chun-An	6	7:34	2.3	37.5%	20.0%	0.0%	0.5	0.3	0.3	0.0
Kaleb Wesson	5	33:21	16.0	50.0%	44.1%	33.3%	10.8	3.8	1.4	0.8
Wu Siao-Jin	2	2:00	1.0	33.3%	0.0%	0.0%	0.5	0.0	0.0	0.0
Chen Huai-An	7	25:11	9.1	44.9%	40.0%	55.6%	4.4	4.9	1.4	0.0
Chin Ming-Ching	1	2:12	0.0	0.0%	0.0%	0.0%	1.0	0.0	1.0	0.0

- Reference：
