= 2025 TPBL playoffs =

Taiwanese basketball tournament

Tournament details
- Dates: May 23 – June 29, 2025
- Season: 2024–25
- Teams: 5

Final positions
- Champions: New Taipei Kings (1st title)
- Runners-up: Kaohsiung Aquas
- Semifinalists: Formosa Dreamers; Taipei Taishin Mars

The 2025 TPBL playoffs was the postseason tournament of the Taiwan Professional Basketball League's (TPBL) 2024–25 season. The play-in series started on May 23 and ended on May 25. The semifinals series started on May 29 and ended on June 8. The finals series started on June 16 and ended on June 29. On June 29, the New Taipei Kings defeated the Kaohsiung Aquas, 4–3, winning the 2024–25 season championship.

== Format ==
Five teams participated in the playoffs. The top three teams, based on winning percentage of regular season, directly qualified for the semifinals. The fourth and fifth seeds played the best-of-three play-in series, which was in a 1-1-1 format. The fourth seed was awarded a one-win advantage. The winner of the play-in series and the top three seeds played the best-of-seven semifinals series, which was in a 2-2-1-1-1 format. The winners of the semifinals series played the best-of-seven finals series, which was in a 2-2-1-1-1 format.

== Playoff qualifying ==
On April 19, 2025, the New Taipei Kings became the first team to clinch the semifinals series. On April 29, the Formosa Dreamers became the final team to secure a direct berth in the semifinals bracket. On May 3, the New Taipei Kings clinched the regular season title. And the Taipei Taishin Mars became the first team to qualify the play-in series. On May 18, the Taoyuan Taiwan Beer Leopards became the final team to qualify the play-in series. On May 25, the Taipei Taishin Mars won the play-in series and advanced to the semifinals bracket.

Seed	Team	Record	Clinched		
Seed	Team	Record	Play-in berth	Semifinals berth	Best record in TPBL
1	New Taipei Kings	26–10	—	April 19	May 3
2	Formosa Dreamers	21–15	—	April 29	—
3	Kaohsiung Aquas	19–17	—	April 27	—
4	Taipei Taishin Mars	16–20	May 3	May 25	—
5	Taoyuan Taiwan Beer Leopards	16–20	May 18	—	—

== Bracket ==
Play-in
4	**Taipei Taishin Mars**	**2**
5	Taoyuan Taiwan Beer Leopards	1

Semifinals
1	**New Taipei Kings**	**4**
4	Taipei Taishin Mars	0
2	Formosa Dreamers	1
3	**Kaohsiung Aquas**	**4**

Finals
1	**New Taipei Kings**	**4**
3	Kaohsiung Aquas	3

Bold: Series winner
Italic: Team with home-court advantage

== Play-in: (4) Taipei Taishin Mars vs. (5) Taoyuan Taiwan Beer Leopards ==
VL Sports
Sportcast
AXN Asia

May 23, 2025
19:00 (UTC+8)

boxscore

Taipei Taishin Mars	68–**113**	**Taoyuan Taiwan Beer Leopards**
Scoring by quarter: 20–**27**, 14–**30**, 16–**32**, 18–**24**
Pts: Manu 12; Rebs: Eric 7 Asts: Ting Sheng-Ju, McCallum 4		Pts: Gao Jin-Wei 20; Rebs: Williams 12; Asts: Gao Jin-Wei 10
**Series tied, 1–1**

Taoyuan Arena, Taoyuan City
Attendance: 3,813
Referees: Chen Hung-Ming, Yeh Chun-Hung, Lai Chien-Hao

VL Sports
Sportcast
AXN Asia

May 25, 2025
17:00 (UTC+8)

boxscore

Taoyuan Taiwan Beer Leopards	84–**86**	**Taipei Taishin Mars**
Scoring by quarter: **28**–20, 23–**24**, 16–**23**, 17–**19**
Pts: Kromah 28; Rebs: Williams 14; Asts: Gao Jin-Wei 6		Pts: Chien 20; Rebs: Moerman 12; Asts: McCallum 8
**Mars wins series, 2–1**

Hsinchu County Stadium, Hsinchu County
Attendance: 2,288
Referees: Chen Chao-Hung, Sung Ming-Lu, Lo Kuo-Hsien

Regular-season series
The Mars won 4–2 in the regular-season series

November 3, 2024

boxscore

**Taoyuan Taiwan Beer Leopards**	**82**–78	Taipei Taishin Mars

Taipei Heping Basketball Gymnasium, Taipei City

December 8, 2024

boxscore

**Taipei Taishin Mars**	**95**–74	Taoyuan Taiwan Beer Leopards

Taoyuan Arena, Taoyuan City

January 10, 2025

boxscore

Taoyuan Taiwan Beer Leopards	85–**97**	**Taipei Taishin Mars**

Taipei Heping Basketball Gymnasium, Taipei City

March 29, 2025

boxscore

Taoyuan Taiwan Beer Leopards	88–**97**	**Taipei Taishin Mars**

Taipei Heping Basketball Gymnasium, Taipei City

April 4, 2025

boxscore

Taipei Taishin Mars	97–**100**	**Taoyuan Taiwan Beer Leopards**

Taoyuan Arena, Taoyuan City

April 27, 2025

boxscore

**Taipei Taishin Mars**	**89**–86	Taoyuan Taiwan Beer Leopards

Taoyuan Arena, Taoyuan City

This was the first playoff meeting between these two teams.

== Semifinals ==
=== (1) New Taipei Kings vs. (4) Taipei Taishin Mars ===
VL Sports
Sportcast
AXN Asia

May 30, 2025
17:00 (UTC+8)

boxscore

Taipei Taishin Mars	88–**111**	**New Taipei Kings**
Scoring by quarter: 16–**27**, 19–**25**, 29–**35**, 24–24
Pts: Manu 25; Rebs: Miller 9 Asts: McCallum 8		Pts: Je. Lin 23; Rebs: Sakakini 14; Asts: Jo. Lin, Manigault 5
**Kings leads series, 1–0**

Xinzhuang Gymnasium, New Taipei City
Attendance: 5,802
Referees: Chen Hung-Ming, Lin Chien-Hung, Hsieh Shang-Chien

VL Sports
Sportcast
AXN Asia

June 1, 2025
17:00 (UTC+8)

boxscore

Taipei Taishin Mars	83–**109**	**New Taipei Kings**
Scoring by quarter: **20**–19, 17–**38**, 29–**31**, 17–**21**
Pts: Eric 15; Rebs: Eric 8 Asts: McCallum 3		Pts: Washburn 26; Rebs: Sakakini 13; Asts: Jo. Lin 15
**Kings leads series, 2–0**

Xinzhuang Gymnasium, New Taipei City
Attendance: 6,248
Referees: Hsieh Wen-Wei, Yeh Chun-Hung, Huang Po-Wei

VL Sports
Sportcast
AXN Asia

June 5, 2025
19:00 (UTC+8)

boxscore

**New Taipei Kings**	**113**–104	Taipei Taishin Mars
Scoring by quarter: **28**–26, **30**–27, 26–**27**, **29**–24
Pts: Manigault 24; Rebs: Sakakini, Manigault 8 Asts: Jo. Lin, Je. Lin 6		Pts: Moerman 37; Rebs: Moerman 12; Asts: Moerman 8
**Kings leads series, 3–0**

Taipei Heping Basketball Gymnasium, Taipei City
Attendance: 3,380
Referees: Chen Chao-Hung, Sung Ming-Lu, Yang Shih-Hsien

VL Sports
Sportcast
AXN Asia

June 7, 2025
17:00 (UTC+8)

boxscore

**New Taipei Kings**	**101**–93	Taipei Taishin Mars
Scoring by quarter: 32–**33**, 19–**21**, 24–**25**, **26**–14
Pts: Lee Kai-Yan 22; Rebs: Sakakini 13; Asts: Manigault 6		Pts: Ting Sheng-Ju 17; Rebs: Eric 11; Asts: Ting Sheng-Ju, Tsao Xun-Xiang 4
**Kings wins series, 4–0**

Taipei Heping Basketball Gymnasium, Taipei City
Attendance: 5,200
Referees: Yu Jung, Huang Chen-Feng, Lai Chien-Hao

Regular-season series
The Kings won 4–2 in the regular-season series

December 21, 2024

boxscore

**New Taipei Kings**	**102**–89	Taipei Taishin Mars

Taipei Heping Basketball Gymnasium, Taipei City

March 1, 2025

boxscore

New Taipei Kings	100–**106**	**Taipei Taishin Mars**

Taipei Heping Basketball Gymnasium, Taipei City

March 22, 2025

boxscore

Taipei Taishin Mars	87–**114**	**New Taipei Kings**

Xinzhuang Gymnasium, New Taipei City

April 6, 2025

boxscore

Taipei Taishin Mars	96–**112**	**New Taipei Kings**

Xinzhuang Gymnasium, New Taipei City

April 16, 2025

boxscore

New Taipei Kings	83–**107**	**Taipei Taishin Mars**

Taipei Heping Basketball Gymnasium, Taipei City

May 9, 2025

boxscore

Taipei Taishin Mars	97–**102**	**New Taipei Kings**

Xinzhuang Gymnasium, New Taipei City

This was the first playoff meeting between these two teams.

=== (2) Formosa Dreamers vs. (3) Kaohsiung Aquas ===
VL Sports
Sportcast
AXN Asia

May 29, 2025
19:00 (UTC+8)

boxscore

**Kaohsiung Aquas**	**104**–99	Formosa Dreamers
Scoring by quarter: 28–**30**, 21–**28**, 19–**22**, **36**–19
Pts: Yu Huan-Ya 24; Rebs: Wesson 8 Asts: Hu Long-Mao 6		Pts: Holman 30; Rebs: Holman 15; Asts: three players 2
**Aquas leads series, 1–0**

Taichung Intercontinental Basketball Stadium, Taichung City
Attendance: 3,000
Referees: Yu Jung, Lai Chien-Hao, Wu Fang-Shan

VL Sports
Sportcast
AXN Asia

May 31, 2025
17:00 (UTC+8)

boxscore

**Kaohsiung Aquas**	**93**–90	Formosa Dreamers
Scoring by quarter: **28**–27, 12–**25**, **26**–23, **27**–15
Pts: Chiu Tzu-Hsuan 24; Rebs: Wesson 11; Asts: three players 4		Pts: Chiang Yu-An 21; Rebs: Holman 12; Asts: Chiang Yu-An 8
**Aquas leads series, 2–0**

Taichung Intercontinental Basketball Stadium, Taichung City
Attendance: 3,000
Referees: Chen Chao-Hung, Huang Chen-Feng, Lo Kuo-Hsien

VL Sports
Sportcast
AXN Asia

June 4, 2025
19:00 (UTC+8)

boxscore

Formosa Dreamers	79–**88**	**Kaohsiung Aquas**
Scoring by quarter: 17–**23**, 21–21, 17–**21**, **24**–23
Pts: Lin Chun-Chi 19; Rebs: Holman 11; Asts: Lin Chun-Chi 6		Pts: Hu Long-Mao 23; Rebs: Wesson 18; Asts: Sword 5
**Aquas leads series, 3–0**

Kaohsiung Arena, Kaohsiung City
Attendance: 6,018
Referees: Chen Hung-Ming, Yeh Chun-Hung, Chen Chien-Lin

VL Sports
Sportcast
AXN Asia

June 6, 2025
19:00 (UTC+8)

boxscore

**Formosa Dreamers**	**106**–92	Kaohsiung Aquas
Scoring by quarter: **26**–19, **41**–26, 20–**22**, 19–**25**
Pts: Chiang Yu-An 33; Rebs: Holman 13; Asts: Chiang Yu-An 4		Pts: Yu Huan-Ya 21; Rebs: Wesson 9 Asts: Sword 6
**Aquas leads series, 3–1**

Kaohsiung Arena, Kaohsiung City
Attendance: 7,123
Referees: Lin Chien-Hung, Chen Chao-Hung, Hsieh Shang-Chien

VL Sports
Sportcast
AXN Asia

June 8, 2025
17:00 (UTC+8)

boxscore

**Kaohsiung Aquas**	**105**–102	Formosa Dreamers
Scoring by quarter: 24–**25**, **26**–23, 30–**32**, **25**–22
Pts: Morse 24; Rebs: Su Wen-Ju, Sword 8 Asts: Hu Long-Mao 7		Pts: Gilbeck 21; Rebs: Gilbeck 12; Asts: Holman 6
**Aquas wins series, 4–1**

Taichung Intercontinental Basketball Stadium, Taichung City
Attendance: 3,000
Referees: Chen Hung-Ming, Yeh Chun-Hung, Lo Kuo-Hsien

Regular-season series
The Dreamers won 4–2 in the regular-season series

November 9, 2024

boxscore

Kaohsiung Aquas	90–**99**	**Formosa Dreamers**

Taichung Intercontinental Basketball Stadium, Taichung City

December 22, 2024

boxscore

**Formosa Dreamers**	**97**–84	Kaohsiung Aquas

Kaohsiung Arena, Kaohsiung City

January 18, 2025

boxscore

Formosa Dreamers	95–**105**	**Kaohsiung Aquas**

Kaohsiung Arena, Kaohsiung City

March 9, 2025

boxscore

Formosa Dreamers	95–**109**	**Kaohsiung Aquas**

Kaohsiung Arena, Kaohsiung City

March 22, 2025

boxscore

Kaohsiung Aquas	87–**101**	**Formosa Dreamers**

Taichung Intercontinental Basketball Stadium, Taichung City

May 4, 2025

boxscore

Kaohsiung Aquas	101–**104**	**Formosa Dreamers**

Taichung Intercontinental Basketball Stadium, Taichung City

This was the first playoff meeting between these two teams.

== TPBL Finals: (1) New Taipei Kings vs. (3) Kaohsiung Aquas ==
VL Sports
Sportcast
AXN Asia

June 16, 2025
19:00 (UTC+8)

boxscore

Kaohsiung Aquas	89–**100**	**New Taipei Kings**
Scoring by quarter: 19–**21**, 18–**29**, **29**–24, 23–**26**
Pts: Sword 23; Rebs: Wesson 12; Asts: Wesson 7		Pts: Manigault, Washburn 22; Rebs: Manigault 21; Asts: Manigault 6
**Kings leads series, 1–0**

Xinzhuang Gymnasium, New Taipei City
Attendance: 6,800
Referees: Yu Jung, Hsieh Wen-Wei, Hsieh Shang-Chien

VL Sports
Sportcast
AXN Asia

June 18, 2025
19:00 (UTC+8)

boxscore

**Kaohsiung Aquas**	**99**–91	New Taipei Kings
Scoring by quarter: 12–**31**, **29**–21, **31**–19, **27**–20
Pts: Sword, Želionis 17; Rebs: Wesson 16; Asts: Wesson 5		Pts: Je. Lin 21; Rebs: Manigault 9 Asts: Manigault 8
**Series tied, 1–1**

Xinzhuang Gymnasium, New Taipei City
Attendance: 6,800
Referees: Chen Hung-Ming, Sung Ming-Lu, Huang Chen-Feng

MOMOTV
VL Sports
Sportcast
AXN Asia

June 21, 2025
17:00 (UTC+8)

boxscore

**New Taipei Kings**	**104**–99	Kaohsiung Aquas
Scoring by quarter: 26–26, **25**–24, 16–**22**, **37**–27
Pts: Je. Lin 26; Rebs: Sakakini 9 Asts: Je. Lin 9		Pts: Sword 26; Rebs: Želionis 12; Asts: Yu Huan-Ya 7
**Kings leads series, 2–1**

Kaohsiung Arena, Kaohsiung City
Attendance: 12,000
Referees: Chen Chao-Hung, Yeh Chun-Hung, Chen Chien-Lin

VL Sports
Sportcast
AXN Asia

June 23, 2025
19:00 (UTC+8)

boxscore

New Taipei Kings	99–**117**	**Kaohsiung Aquas**
Scoring by quarter: 27–**30**, 24–**33**, 26–**28**, 22–**26**
Pts: Washburn 20; Rebs: Sakakini 10; Asts: Je. Lin 10		Pts: Želionis 25; Rebs: Želionis 8 Asts: Yu Huan-Ya 8
**Series tied, 2–2**

Kaohsiung Arena, Kaohsiung City
Attendance: 10,142
Referees: Lin Chien-Hung, Lo Kuo-Hsien, Lai Chien-Hao

VL Sports
Sportcast
AXN Asia

June 25, 2025
19:00 (UTC+8)

boxscore

Kaohsiung Aquas	83–**93**	**New Taipei Kings**
Scoring by quarter: **23**–17, 13–**27**, 16–**22**, **31**–27
Pts: Želionis, Sword 17; Rebs: Želionis 14; Asts: Sword 4		Pts: Je. Lin 29; Rebs: Daye 11; Asts: Lee Kai-Yan 6
**Kings leads series, 3–2**

Xinzhuang Gymnasium, New Taipei City
Attendance: 6,800
Referees: Yu Jung, Chen Chao-Hung, Sung Ming-Lu

VL Sports
Sportcast
AXN Asia

June 27, 2025
19:00 (UTC+8)

boxscore

New Taipei Kings	109–**112** (OT)	**Kaohsiung Aquas**
Scoring by quarter: **30**–26, 18–**24**, 31–31, **20**–18, Overtime: 10–**13**
Pts: Je. Lin 26; Rebs: Manigault 9 Asts: Je. Lin 8		Pts: Sword 26; Rebs: Wesson 9 Asts: Sword 9
**Series tied, 3–3**

Kaohsiung Arena, Kaohsiung City
Attendance: 12,000
Referees: Chen Hung-Ming, Lin Chien-Hung, Lo Kuo-Hsien

VL Sports
Sportcast
AXN Asia

June 29, 2025
17:00 (UTC+8)

boxscore

Kaohsiung Aquas	89–**108**	**New Taipei Kings**
Scoring by quarter: 18–**35**, 20–**26**, **30**–21, 21–**26**
Pts: Wesson 25; Rebs: Wesson 12; Asts: Chen Huai-An 8		Pts: Je. Lin 27; Rebs: Daye, Washburn 14; Asts: three players 4
**Kings wins series, 4–3**

Xinzhuang Gymnasium, New Taipei City
Attendance: 6,800
Referees: Yu Jung, Yeh Chun-Hung, Lai Chien-Hao

Regular-season series
The Kings won 5–1 in the regular-season series

October 19, 2024

boxscore

**New Taipei Kings**	**88**–78	Kaohsiung Aquas

Kaohsiung Arena, Kaohsiung City

December 15, 2024

boxscore

**New Taipei Kings**	**107**–78	Kaohsiung Aquas

Kaohsiung Arena, Kaohsiung City

December 28, 2024

boxscore

Kaohsiung Aquas	108–**111**	**New Taipei Kings**

Xinzhuang Gymnasium, New Taipei City

April 2, 2025

boxscore

Kaohsiung Aquas	91–**111**	**New Taipei Kings**

Xinzhuang Gymnasium, New Taipei City

April 5, 2025

boxscore

Kaohsiung Aquas	92–**106**	**New Taipei Kings**

Xinzhuang Gymnasium, New Taipei City

April 26, 2025

boxscore

New Taipei Kings	83–**97**	**Kaohsiung Aquas**

Kaohsiung Arena, Kaohsiung City

This was the first playoff meeting between these two teams.

== Statistical leaders ==
Category	Game high			Average			
Category	Player	Team	High	Player	Team	Avg.	GP
Points	Adrien Moerman	Taipei Taishin Mars	37	Lasan Kromah	Taoyuan Taiwan Beer Leopards	22.0	2
Rebounds	Kenny Manigault	New Taipei Kings	21	Devin Williams	Taoyuan Taiwan Beer Leopards	13.0	2
Assists	Joseph Lin	New Taipei Kings	15	Gao Jin-Wei	Taoyuan Taiwan Beer Leopards	8.0	2
Steals	Kaleb Wesson	Kaohsiung Aquas	6	Lasan Kromah	Taoyuan Taiwan Beer Leopards	4.5	2
Blocks	Kaleb Wesson; Jeremy Lin	Kaohsiung Aquas; New Taipei Kings	4	Lasan Kromah	Taoyuan Taiwan Beer Leopards	1.5	2
