= 2024–25 Kaohsiung Aquas season =

Taiwanese professional basketball season

- President: Hou Chia-Chi
- Head Coach: Mathias Fischer
- Arena: Kaohsiung Arena

TPBL results
- Record: 19–17 (52.8%)
- Place: 3rd
- Playoffs finish: Finals (lost to Kings, 3–4)

Player records
- Points: Anthony Morse 15.8
- Rebounds: Anthony Morse 10.1
- Assists: Chen Huai-An 4.7

The 2024–25 Kaohsiung Aquas season was the franchise's fourth season, its first season in the Taiwan Professional Basketball League (TPBL).

On May 23, 2024, the Aquas announced that Brendan Joyce left the team. On July 10, the Aquas hired Mathias Fischer as their new head coach.

== Draft ==
Round	Pick	Player	Position(s)	School / club team
1	4	Wei Liang-Che	Guard	NKNU

- Reference：

== Roster ==
2024–25 Kaohsiung Aquas roster
Players
Coaches

Pos.	No.	Nat.	Name	Ht.	Wt.	Age	From
PG	0	(Taiwan) (Vietnam)	Wei Liang-Che	1.85 m (6 ft 1 in)	78 kg (172 lb)	23 – 28 November 2001	NKNU
PF	1	(Lithuania)	Edgaras Želionis (I)	2.08 m (6 ft 10 in)	100 kg (220 lb)	36 – 4 June 1989	Lithuania
G	3	(United States)	Craig Sword (I)	1.91 m (6 ft 3 in)	89 kg (196 lb)	31 – 16 January 1994	Mississippi State
SG	7	(Taiwan)	Yu Huan-Ya	1.82 m (6 ft 0 in)	81 kg (179 lb)	31 – 30 November 1993	NTNU
SG	8	(Taiwan)	Chiu Tzu-Hsuan	1.90 m (6 ft 3 in)	89 kg (196 lb)	25 – 8 December 1999	ISU
PF	10	(Taiwan)	Hu Long-Mao	1.96 m (6 ft 5 in)	101 kg (223 lb)	32 – 22 December 1992	Chaminade
SF	11	(Taiwan)	Tang Wei-Chieh	1.92 m (6 ft 4 in)	89 kg (196 lb)	25 – 25 September 1999	VMI
SF	12	(Taiwan)	Lin Jen-Hung	1.94 m (6 ft 4 in)	88 kg (194 lb)	31 – 18 December 1993	NTNU
PF	18	(Taiwan)	Wu I-Ping	2.00 m (6 ft 7 in)	92 kg (203 lb)	32 – 29 August 1992	ISU
C	21	(Taiwan)	Lu Wei-Ting	2.01 m (6 ft 7 in)	103 kg (227 lb)	28 – 16 April 1997	ISU
PF	22	(United States) (Italy)	Anthony Morse (I)	2.04 m (6 ft 8 in)	104 kg (229 lb)	31 – 13 April 1994	Tennessee Tech
SG	24	(Taiwan)	Su Wen-Ju	1.87 m (6 ft 2 in)	78 kg (172 lb)	27 – 16 October 1997	ISU
SG	28	(Taiwan)	Yu Chun-An (C)	1.89 m (6 ft 2 in)	83 kg (183 lb)	33 – 13 February 1992	NTNU
C	34	(United States)	Kaleb Wesson (I)	2.08 m (6 ft 10 in)	110 kg (243 lb)	25 – 27 July 1999	Ohio State
SF	57	(Taiwan)	Wu Siao-Jin	1.90 m (6 ft 3 in)	81 kg (179 lb)	29 – 28 August 1995	NKNU
PG	66	(Taiwan)	Chen Huai-An	1.86 m (6 ft 1 in)	86 kg (190 lb)	28 – 29 April 1997	NTUA
C	85	(Taiwan)	Chin Ming-Ching	1.95 m (6 ft 5 in)	106 kg (234 lb)	30 – 14 November 1994	NTNU

Head coach

- (Germany) Mathias Fischer

Assistant coach(es)

- (Taiwan) Zhu Yong-Hong
- (Taiwan) Peng Te-Hsuan
- (Taiwan) Liao Che-Yi

Athletic trainer(s)

- (Taiwan) Liao Hsuan-Yi

Legend

- (C) Team captain
- (I) Import player
- Injured

- Roster
Updated: May 29, 2025

== Summer League ==
=== Game log ===
Recap

September 11, 2024
14:00 (UTC+8)

Kaohsiung Aquas	85–82	Hsinchu Toplus Lioneers

CTBC administration building basketball court, Taipei City

Recap

September 13, 2024
14:00 (UTC+8)

New Taipei CTBC DEA	75–79	Kaohsiung Aquas

CTBC administration building basketball court, Taipei City

== Preseason ==
=== Game log ===
2024 preseason game log
Total: 2–0 (home: 1–0; road: 1–0)
Preseason : 2–0 (home: 1–0; road: 1–0)

Game	Date	Team	Score	High points	High rebounds	High assists	Location Attendance	Record
1	October 6	@ Lioneers	W 102–78	Wu Siao-Jin (20)	Kaleb Wesson (10)	Jason Brickman (8)	Taichung Intercontinental Basketball Stadium; 2,807	1–0
2	October 12	Dreamers	W 118–93	Anthony Morse (22)	Kaleb Wesson (12)	Chen Huai-An (7)	Hsinchu County Stadium; 3,169	2–0

Color： Win Lose
Schedule

== Regular season ==
=== Standings ===
Pos	Team	Pld	W	L	PCT	GB	Qualification
1	New Taipei Kings	36	26	10	.722	—	Advance to semifinals
2	Formosa Dreamers	36	21	15	.583	5	Advance to semifinals
3	Kaohsiung Aquas	36	19	17	.528	7	Advance to semifinals
4	Taipei Taishin Mars	36	16	20	.444	10	Advance to play-in
5	Taoyuan Taiwan Beer Leopards	36	16	20	.444	10	Advance to play-in
6	New Taipei CTBC DEA	36	16	20	.444	10	
7	Hsinchu Toplus Lioneers	36	12	24	.333	14	

Source: TPBL

=== Game log ===
2024–25 regular season game log
Total: 19–17 (home: 14–4; road: 5–13)
October : 3–1 (home: 3–1; road: 0–0)

Game	Date	Team	Score	High points	High rebounds	High assists	Location Attendance	Record
1	October 19	Kings	L 78–88	Kaleb Wesson (20)	Hu Long-Mao (9); Kaleb Wesson (9)	Jason Brickman (11)	Kaohsiung Arena; 8,156	0–1
2	October 20	Lioneers	W 93–79	Kaleb Wesson (26)	Kaleb Wesson (13)	Chen Huai-An (8)	Kaohsiung Arena; 4,164	1–1
3	October 26	Mars	W 88–71	Kaleb Wesson (15)	Kaleb Wesson (10)	Jason Brickman (8)	Kaohsiung Arena; 3,619	2–1
4	October 27	Leopards	W 88–87	Kaleb Wesson (19)	Kaleb Wesson (12)	Chen Huai-An (9)	Kaohsiung Arena; 3,588	3–1

November : 0–2 (home: 0–0; road: 0–2)

Game	Date	Team	Score	High points	High rebounds	High assists	Location Attendance	Record
5	November 2	@ DEA	L 97–107	Anthony Morse (23)	Anthony Morse (15)	Jason Brickman (12)	Xinzhuang Gymnasium; 4,979	3–2
6	November 9	@ Dreamers	L 90–99	Kaleb Wesson (27)	Kaleb Wesson (17)	Jason Brickman (11)	Taichung Intercontinental Basketball Stadium; 3,000	3–3

December : 4–3 (home: 3–2; road: 1–1)

Game	Date	Team	Score	High points	High rebounds	High assists	Location Attendance	Record
7	December 1	@ Leopards	W 106–94 (OT)	Kaleb Wesson (31)	Kaleb Wesson (13)	Anthony Morse (6); Su Wen-Ju (6)	Taoyuan Arena; 4,227	4–3
8	December 14	Leopards	W 95–87	Su Wen-Ju (22)	Kaleb Wesson (15)	Chen Huai-An (6)	Kaohsiung Arena; 4,062	5–3
9	December 15	Kings	L 78–107	Edgaras Želionis (17)	Anthony Morse (7); Chen Huai-An (7)	Chen Huai-An (6)	Kaohsiung Arena; 9,223	5–4
10	December 18	Mars	W 102–94	Anthony Morse (25)	Edgaras Želionis (17)	Chen Huai-An (11)	Kaohsiung Arena; 2,371	6–4
11	December 20	Leopards	W 105–95	Edgaras Želionis (24)	Edgaras Želionis (13)	Chen Huai-An (14)	Kaohsiung Arena; 2,912	7–4
12	December 22	Dreamers	L 84–97	Edgaras Želionis (15)	Edgaras Želionis (16)	Chen Huai-An (6)	Kaohsiung Arena; 5,328	7–5
13	December 28	@ Kings	L 108–111 (2OT)	Edgaras Želionis (30)	Edgaras Želionis (18)	Chen Huai-An (14)	Xinzhuang Gymnasium; 5,659	7–6

January : 4–2 (home: 4–1; road: 0–1)

Game	Date	Team	Score	High points	High rebounds	High assists	Location Attendance	Record
14	January 5	@ Mars	L 90–100	Anthony Morse (24)	Anthony Morse (12)	Wei Liang-Che (6)	Taipei Heping Basketball Gymnasium; 3,326	7–7
15	January 11	DEA	L 72–88	Craig Sword (17)	Anthony Morse (15)	Yu Huan-Ya (4); Edgaras Želionis (4)	Kaohsiung Arena; 2,856	7–8
16	January 12	Lioneers	W 103–78	Edgaras Želionis (25)	Edgaras Želionis (17)	Chen Huai-An (7)	Kaohsiung Arena; 4,015	8–8
17	January 15	Mars	W 98–76	Craig Sword (23)	Edgaras Želionis (15)	Craig Sword (6)	Kaohsiung Arena; 2,812	9–8
18	January 18	Dreamers	W 105–95	Craig Sword (39)	Edgaras Želionis (13)	Chiu Tzu-Hsuan (5)	Kaohsiung Arena; 4,671	10–8
19	January 19	DEA	W 104–91	Su Wen-Ju (22)	Anthony Morse (8)	Yu Huan-Ya (8)	Kaohsiung Arena; 4,608	11–8

February : 0–2 (home: 0–0; road: 0–2)

Game	Date	Team	Score	High points	High rebounds	High assists	Location Attendance	Record
20	February 5	@ Lioneers	L 91–97	Edgaras Želionis (26)	Anthony Morse (16)	Craig Sword (5)	Hsinchu County Stadium; 3,578	11–9
21	February 28	@ DEA	L 79–85	Craig Sword (24)	Edgaras Želionis (13)	Chiu Tzu-Hsuan (7)	Xinzhuang Gymnasium; 4,016	11–10

March : 4–2 (home: 2–0; road: 2–2)

Game	Date	Team	Score	High points	High rebounds	High assists	Location Attendance	Record
22	March 2	@ Mars	W 99–80	Anthony Morse (23); Edgaras Želionis (23)	Anthony Morse (14); Edgaras Želionis (14)	Chiu Tzu-Hsuan (4); Yu Huan-Ya (4)	Taipei Heping Basketball Gymnasium; 2,991	12–10
23	March 8	Lioneers	W 104–88	Craig Sword (32)	Anthony Morse (10)	Yu Huan-Ya (6)	Kaohsiung Arena; 5,081	13–10
24	March 9	Dreamers	W 109–95	Edgaras Želionis (22)	Anthony Morse (10); Edgaras Želionis (10)	Yu Huan-Ya (6)	Kaohsiung Arena; 6,212	14–10
25	March 16	@ Lioneers	L 103–116	Edgaras Želionis (22)	Anthony Morse (11)	Chiu Tzu-Hsuan (6); Chen Huai-An (6)	Hsinchu County Stadium; 4,791	14–11
—	March 19	@ Kings	Rescheduled to April 2					
26	March 22	@ Dreamers	L 87–101	Chiu Tzu-Hsuan (23)	Edgaras Želionis (10)	Yu Huan-Ya (4)	Taichung Intercontinental Basketball Stadium; 2,793	14–12
27	March 26	@ DEA	W 87–78	Edgaras Želionis (22)	Anthony Morse (13)	Yu Huan-Ya (6); Chiu Tzu-Hsuan (6)	Xinzhuang Gymnasium; 2,933	15–12

April : 4–3 (home: 2–0; road: 2–3)

Game	Date	Team	Score	High points	High rebounds	High assists	Location Attendance	Record
28	April 2	@ Kings	L 91–111	Craig Sword (22)	Anthony Morse (7); Edgaras Želionis (7)	Chen Huai-An (5)	Xinzhuang Gymnasium; 3,066	15–13
29	April 5	@ Kings	L 92–106	Anthony Morse (22)	Craig Sword (11)	Craig Sword (6)	Xinzhuang Gymnasium; 4,295	15–14
30	April 11	@ Leopards	L 103–107	Chiu Tzu-Hsuan (21); Yu Huan-Ya (21)	Kaleb Wesson (15)	Craig Sword (5)	Taoyuan Arena; 3,813	15–15
31	April 13	@ Mars	W 96–76	Kaleb Wesson (21)	Kaleb Wesson (19)	Yu Huan-Ya (6)	Taipei Heping Basketball Gymnasium; 3,699	16–15
32	April 20	@ Leopards	W 103–75	Chiu Tzu-Hsuan (24)	Kaleb Wesson (15)	Yu Huan-Ya (8)	Taoyuan Arena; 5,322	17–15
33	April 26	Kings	W 97–83	Anthony Morse (24)	Kaleb Wesson (21)	Kaleb Wesson (6)	Kaohsiung Arena; 7,386	18–15
34	April 27	DEA	W 91–80 (OT)	Kaleb Wesson (20)	Anthony Morse (14)	Chiu Tzu-Hsuan (7)	Kaohsiung Arena; 5,015	19–15

May : 0–2 (home: 0–0; road: 0–2)

Game	Date	Team	Score	High points	High rebounds	High assists	Location Attendance	Record
35	May 4	@ Dreamers	L 101–104	Kaleb Wesson (25)	Kaleb Wesson (16)	Yu Huan-Ya (4); Chen Huai-An (4)	Taichung Intercontinental Basketball Stadium; 2,813	19–16
36	May 11	@ Lioneers	L 99–118	Craig Sword (23)	Kaleb Wesson (8)	Yu Huan-Ya (9)	Hsinchu County Stadium; 4,312	19–17

Color： Win Lose Rescheduled
Schedule

=== Regular season note ===
- Due to the 2025 FIBA Asia Cup qualification, the TPBL declared that the game on March 19 would be rescheduled to April 2.

== Playoffs ==
=== Game log ===
2025 playoffs game log
Total: 7–5 (home: 3–2; road: 4–3)
Semifinals : 4–1 (home: 1–1; road: 3–0)

Game	Date	Team	Score	High points	High rebounds	High assists	Location Attendance	Series
1	May 29	@ Dreamers	W 104–99	Yu Huan-Ya (24)	Kaleb Wesson (8)	Hu Long-Mao (6)	Taichung Intercontinental Basketball Stadium; 3,000	1–0
2	May 31	@ Dreamers	W 93–90	Chiu Tzu-Hsuan (24)	Kaleb Wesson (11)	Chiu Tzu-Hsuan (4); Craig Sword (4); Yu Huan-Ya (4)	Taichung Intercontinental Basketball Stadium; 3,000	2–0
3	June 4	Dreamers	W 88–79	Hu Long-Mao (23)	Kaleb Wesson (18)	Craig Sword (5)	Kaohsiung Arena; 6,018	3–0
4	June 6	Dreamers	L 92–106	Yu Huan-Ya (21)	Kaleb Wesson (9)	Craig Sword (6)	Kaohsiung Arena; 7,123	3–1
5	June 8	@ Dreamers	W 105–102	Anthony Morse (24)	Su Wen-Ju (8); Craig Sword (8)	Hu Long-Mao (7)	Taichung Intercontinental Basketball Stadium; 3,000	4–1

Finals : 3–4 (home: 2–1; road: 1–3)

Game	Date	Team	Score	High points	High rebounds	High assists	Location Attendance	Series
1	June 16	@ Kings	L 89–100	Craig Sword (23)	Kaleb Wesson (12)	Kaleb Wesson (7)	Xinzhuang Gymnasium; 6,800	0–1
2	June 18	@ Kings	W 99–91	Craig Sword (17); Edgaras Želionis (17)	Kaleb Wesson (16)	Kaleb Wesson (5)	Xinzhuang Gymnasium; 6,800	1–1
3	June 21	Kings	L 99–104	Craig Sword (26)	Edgaras Želionis (12)	Yu Huan-Ya (7)	Kaohsiung Arena; 12,000	1–2
4	June 23	Kings	W 117–99	Edgaras Želionis (25)	Edgaras Želionis (8)	Yu Huan-Ya (8)	Kaohsiung Arena; 10,142	2–2
5	June 25	@ Kings	L 83–93	Edgaras Želionis (17); Craig Sword (17)	Edgaras Želionis (14)	Craig Sword (4)	Xinzhuang Gymnasium; 6,800	2–3
6	June 27	Kings	112–109 (OT)	Craig Sword (26)	Kaleb Wesson (9)	Craig Sword (9)	Kaohsiung Arena; 12,000	3–3
7	June 29	@ Kings	L 89–108	Kaleb Wesson (25)	Kaleb Wesson (12)	Chen Huai-An (8)	Xinzhuang Gymnasium; 6,800	3–4

Color： Win Lose
Schedule

== Player statistics ==
Legend
GP	Games played	MPG	Minutes per game	FG%	Field goal percentage
3P%	3-point field goal percentage	FT%	Free throw percentage	RPG	Rebounds per game
APG	Assists per game	SPG	Steals per game	BPG	Blocks per game
PPG	Points per game		Led the league

=== Regular season ===
Player	GP	MPG	PPG	FG%	3P%	FT%	RPG	APG	SPG	BPG
Wei Liang-Che	24	11:12	2.3	29.3%	23.5%	40.0%	1.0	1.8	0.4	0.0
Edgaras Želionis^{≠}	19	33:54	18.1	48.7%	24.0%	86.5%	11.7	2.6	1.3	0.7
Craig Sword^{≠}	20	28:07	18.6	42.5%	35.7%	75.7%	5.3	3.4	1.9	0.5
Jason Brickman^{‡}	6	29:03	7.7	34.7%	23.5%	88.9%	3.2	8.2	1.8	0.0
Yu Huan-Ya	35	26:27	8.6	37.0%	35.7%	55.8%	1.9	3.5	0.8	0.0
Chiu Tzu-Hsuan	19	27:41	10.4	37.3%	25.7%	61.9%	3.8	3.5	1.9	0.1
Hu Long-Mao	33	19:30	8.0	40.0%	29.0%	64.6%	3.3	1.4	0.7	0.1
Tang Wei-Chieh	25	9:46	4.3	40.2%	33.3%	57.1%	2.1	0.3	0.6	0.1
Lin Jen-Hung	35	14:53	3.0	38.0%	30.6%	35.0%	1.6	0.5	0.5	0.1
Terrence Bieshaar^{‡}	3	20:18	4.3	26.7%	20.0%	60.0%	2.7	1.0	0.3	0.3
Wu I-Ping	4	4:00	0.0	0.0%	0.0%	0.0%	0.3	0.0	0.0	0.0
Lu Wei-Ting	19	6:27	2.0	42.9%	31.6%	53.3%	1.3	0.3	0.2	0.3
Anthony Morse	35	31:56	15.8	47.9%	20.0%	72.3%	10.1	1.2	0.8	0.4
Arnett Moultrie^{≠‡}	2	20:00	3.0	33.3%	0.0%	0.0%	5.5	1.5	0.0	0.5
Su Wen-Ju	31	28:22	10.9	39.5%	35.6%	75.5%	4.2	2.1	1.5	0.1
Yu Chun-An	32	7:50	2.7	38.8%	31.4%	45.0%	1.0	0.4	0.7	0.1
Kaleb Wesson	15	35:39	19.4	51.0%	41.4%	65.4%	13.3	3.5	1.5	1.3
Wu Siao-Jin	32	14:18	3.8	33.8%	26.7%	66.7%	0.8	0.5	0.6	0.0
Chen Huai-An	33	20:01	5.2	31.1%	24.3%	54.3%	2.5	4.7	0.9	0.2
Chin Ming-Ching	14	6:11	0.6	30.8%	0.0%	0.0%	0.9	0.4	0.4	0.0

^{‡} Left during the season
^{≠} Acquired during the season

=== Semifinals ===
Player	GP	MPG	PPG	FG%	3P%	FT%	RPG	APG	SPG	BPG
Wei Liang-Che	Did not play									
Edgaras Želionis	1	25:41	13.0	50.0%	40.0%	100.0%	5.0	3.0	1.0	0.0
Craig Sword	5	37:38	15.6	40.6%	22.6%	79.2%	5.4	4.4	1.2	0.0
Yu Huan-Ya	5	32:20	16.0	45.6%	37.8%	78.6%	1.4	3.6	0.6	0.2
Chiu Tzu-Hsuan	5	32:52	12.6	41.8%	20.0%	68.8%	2.4	2.6	2.4	0.2
Hu Long-Mao	5	35:43	17.8	50.0%	45.7%	64.7%	4.6	4.6	0.8	0.0
Tang Wei-Chieh	2	2:29	2.0	0.0%	0.0%	100.0%	0.5	0.0	0.0	0.0
Lin Jen-Hung	1	10:49	3.0	33.3%	100.0%	0.0%	2.0	1.0	0.0	1.0
Wu I-Ping	Did not play									
Lu Wei-Ting	3	1:24	0.0	0.0%	0.0%	0.0%	0.0	0.0	0.0	0.0
Anthony Morse	4	27:32	12.8	46.2%	0.0%	68.2%	6.5	1.3	0.5	0.8
Su Wen-Ju	4	31:04	9.8	40.0%	31.3%	83.3%	5.8	1.8	0.8	0.5
Yu Chun-An	2	8:19	3.0	50.0%	66.7%	0.0%	0.0	0.0	0.5	0.5
Kaleb Wesson	5	30:13	8.6	29.8%	25.0%	50.0%	10.4	2.8	2.0	1.6
Wu Siao-Jin	1	1:37	0.0	0.0%	0.0%	0.0%	0.0	0.0	0.0	0.0
Chen Huai-An	5	11:31	2.6	33.3%	25.0%	55.6%	1.6	2.0	1.2	0.0
Chin Ming-Ching	Did not play									

=== Finals ===
Player	GP	MPG	PPG	FG%	3P%	FT%	RPG	APG	SPG	BPG
Wei Liang-Che	Did not play									
Edgaras Želionis	6	30:22	18.2	47.5%	32.3%	71.9%	9.0	2.2	1.0	0.7
Craig Sword	7	34:09	21.3	50.5%	36.4%	81.4%	5.7	4.1	1.7	0.7
Yu Huan-Ya	7	26:42	7.3	34.0%	30.6%	75.0%	1.1	3.9	1.1	0.0
Chiu Tzu-Hsuan	7	23:20	4.9	29.5%	17.4%	66.7%	3.1	2.3	1.4	0.3
Hu Long-Mao	7	30:14	11.7	51.9%	50.0%	75.0%	3.0	1.7	0.6	0.4
Tang Wei-Chieh	2	1:40	0.0	0.0%	0.0%	0.0%	0.5	0.0	0.0	0.0
Lin Jen-Hung	2	2:52	0.0	0.0%	0.0%	0.0%	0.0	0.0	0.0	0.0
Wu I-Ping	Did not play									
Lu Wei-Ting	4	4:21	1.3	25.0%	16.7%	0.0%	1.0	0.0	0.0	0.3
Anthony Morse	3	27:45	9.7	50.0%	50.0%	50.0%	5.3	1.0	0.7	0.0
Su Wen-Ju	7	30:59	9.9	37.3%	48.4%	100.0%	2.9	1.3	1.7	0.1
Yu Chun-An	6	7:34	2.3	37.5%	20.0%	0.0%	0.5	0.3	0.3	0.0
Kaleb Wesson	5	33:21	16.0	50.0%	44.1%	33.3%	10.8	3.8	1.4	0.8
Wu Siao-Jin	2	2:00	1.0	33.3%	0.0%	0.0%	0.5	0.0	0.0	0.0
Chen Huai-An	7	25:11	9.1	44.9%	40.0%	55.6%	4.4	4.9	1.4	0.0
Chin Ming-Ching	1	2:12	0.0	0.0%	0.0%	0.0%	1.0	0.0	1.0	0.0

- Reference：

== Transactions ==
=== Overview ===
Players added

Via draft

- Wei Liang-Che

Via free agency

- Terrence Bieshaar
- Anthony Morse
- Arnett Moultrie
- Craig Sword
- Kaleb Wesson
- Edgaras Želionis
Players lost

Via free agency

- Aaron Geramipoor
- Perry Jones
- Mindaugas Kupšas
- Shannon Scott
- Wang Yung-Cheng

Waived

- Terrence Bieshaar
- Jason Brickman
- Arnett Moultrie

=== Free agency ===
==== Re-signed ====
Date	Player	Contract terms	Ref.
June 16, 2024	Su Wen-Ju	—N/a	
June 17, 2024	Lu Wei-Ting	—N/a	
June 19, 2024	Hu Long-Mao	3-year contract, worth unknown	

==== Additions ====
Date	Player	Contract terms	Former team	Ref.
July 26, 2024	Anthony Morse	—N/a	(Turkey) Esenler Erokspor	
July 29, 2024	Kaleb Wesson	—N/a	(France) Élan Chalon	
July 31, 2024	Wei Liang-Che	—N/a	(Taiwan) NKNU	
August 2, 2024	Terrence Bieshaar	—N/a	(Netherlands) Landstede Hammers	
December 3, 2024	Edgaras Želionis	—N/a	(Mexico) El Calor de Cancún	
January 1, 2025	Craig Sword	—N/a	(Australia) Tasmania JackJumpers	
February 7, 2025	Arnett Moultrie	—N/a	(Taiwan) Taipei Fubon Braves	

==== Subtractions ====
Date	Player	Reason	New team	Ref.
May 26, 2024	Perry Jones	Contract expired	(Venezuela) Spartans Distrito Capital	
June 26, 2024	Mindaugas Kupšas	Contract expired	(China) Hefei Storm	
July 17, 2024	Aaron Geramipoor	Contract expired	(Mexico) Soles de Mexicali	
July 19, 2024	Shannon Scott	Contract expired → Retirement	—N/a	
July 22, 2024	Wang Yung-Cheng	Contract expired	Bank of Taiwan	
December 18, 2024	Jason Brickman	Contract terminated	(Philippines) Strong Group Athletics	
December 31, 2024	Terrence Bieshaar	Contract terminated	(Netherlands) Heroes Den Bosch	
April 3, 2025	Arnett Moultrie	Contract terminated	(Syria) Homs Al Fidaa	

== Awards ==
=== Yearly awards ===
Recipient	Award	Ref.
Su Wen-Ju	Most Improved Player	
Su Wen-Ju	All-Defensive First Team	
Su Wen-Ju	All-TPBL Second Team	
Yu Huan-Ya	Sixth Man of the Year	

=== Player of the Week ===
Week	Recipient	Award	Ref.
5	Kaleb Wesson	Week 5 Player of the Week	
8	Chen Huai-An	Week 8 Player of the Week	
22	Chiu Tzu-Hsuan	Week 22 Player of the Week	
23	Kaleb Wesson	Week 23 Player of the Week	

=== Player of the Month ===
Month	Recipient	Award	Ref.
October & November	Kaleb Wesson	October & November Player of the Month (import)	
April	Kaleb Wesson	April Player of the Month (import)	
