= 2023–24 New Taipei Kings season =

Taiwanese professional basketball season

New Taipei Kings
2023–24 season
- President: Walter Wang
- General Manager: James Mao
- Head Coach: Ryan Marchand
- Arena: Xinzhuang Gymnasium
- PLG: 22–18(.550)
- Playoffs: PLG champions (defeated Pilots 4–1)
- EASL: 4th
- Scoring leader: Kenny Manigault (16.03)
- Rebounding leader: Kenny Manigault (9.24)
- Assists leader: Joseph Lin (6.74)
- Highest home attendance: 6,540 (2 games)
- Lowest home attendance: 3,532 (March 26, 2024)
- Average home attendance: 4,799
- Biggest win: Kings 121–82 Steelers (May 18, 2024)
- Biggest defeat: Kings 74–102 Braves (April 27, 2024)
- All statistics correct as of May 18, 2024.

The 2023–24 New Taipei Kings season is the franchise's 3rd season, its third season in the P. League+ (PLG), its 3rd in New Taipei City. The Kings are coached by Ryan Marchand in his third year as head coach.

On September 5, 2023, East Asia Super League announced that the Kings will take over the defunct Chun Yu Bay Area Dragons's spot in 2023–24 East Asia Super League as the 2023 PLG runner-up.

== Draft ==
Round	Pick	Player	Position	Status	School/club team
1	5	Su Pei-Kai	G	Local	NTUA

== Standings ==
Pos	Team	W	L	PCT	GB	Qualification
1	Taoyuan Pauian Pilots	26	14	.650	—	Playoffs
2	Formosa Dreamers	24	16	.600	2	Playoffs
3	New Taipei Kings	22	18	.550	4	Playoffs
4	Hsinchu Toplus Lioneers	21	19	.525	5	Playoffs
5	Taipei Fubon Braves	18	22	.450	8	
6	Kaohsiung 17LIVE Steelers	9	31	.225	17	

Updated to match(es) played on 19 May 2024. Source: P.League+

== Roster ==
2023–24 New Taipei Kings roster
Players
Coaches

Pos.	No.	Nat.	Name	Ht.	Wt.	DOB (YYYY-MM-DD)	From
G	1	(United States) (Taiwan)	Joseph Lin (HP)	1.82 m (6 ft 0 in)	69 kg (152 lb)	33 – 21 June 1992	Hamilton
G	2	(Taiwan)	Su Pei-Kai	1.83 m (6 ft 0 in)	84 kg (185 lb)	25 – 2 November 1999	NTUA
F	3	(Taiwan)	Chen Chun-Nan	1.90 m (6 ft 3 in)	90 kg (198 lb)	25 – 20 April 2000	NTSU
G	4	(Taiwan)	Li Wei-Ting	1.81 m (5 ft 11 in)	84.3 kg (186 lb)	25 – 3 October 1999	SHU
F	6	(Taiwan)	Yang Chin-Min	1.90 m (6 ft 3 in)	92 kg (203 lb)	41 – 22 January 1984	Fu Jen
G	7	(United States) (Taiwan)	Jeremy Lin (HP)	1.91 m (6 ft 3 in)	91 kg (201 lb)	36 – 23 August 1988	Harvard
G	9	(Taiwan)	Lee Kai-Yan	1.82 m (6 ft 0 in)	80 kg (176 lb)	32 – 6 May 1993	HWU
G	10	(Taiwan)	Chien You-Che	1.80 m (5 ft 11 in)	80 kg (176 lb)	29 – 10 September 1995	Chien Hsin Tech
C	11	(Taiwan)	Wang Po-Chih	1.95 m (6 ft 5 in)	130 kg (287 lb)	28 – 29 October 1996	NTSU
F	14	(United States) (Mexico)	Tony Mitchell (I)	2.01 m (6 ft 7 in)	107 kg (236 lb)	33 – 7 April 1992	North Texas
F	17	(Taiwan)	Su Shih-Hsuan	1.97 m (6 ft 6 in)	95 kg (209 lb)	29 – 9 April 1996	NTNU
F	19	(Taiwan)	Lin Chin-Pang (C)	1.90 m (6 ft 3 in)	90 kg (198 lb)	40 – 15 June 1985	NTCPE
G	24	(Taiwan)	Hung Chih-Shan	1.76 m (5 ft 9 in)	80 kg (176 lb)	40 – 5 July 1985	NTUT
F	25	(United States)	Austin Daye (I)	2.07 m (6 ft 9 in)	91 kg (201 lb)	37 – 5 June 1988	Gonzaga
F	35	(United States)	Wendell Lewis (I)	2.08 m (6 ft 10 in)	118 kg (260 lb)	35 – 21 September 1989	Alabama State
F	49	(Taiwan)	Chai Chen-Hao	1.94 m (6 ft 4 in)	95 kg (209 lb)	32 – 25 July 1993	UKN
C	50	(Taiwan)	Quincy Davis (S)	2.03 m (6 ft 8 in)	114 kg (251 lb)	42 – 16 February 1983	Tulane
F	55	(United States)	Kenny Manigault (I)	1.96 m (6 ft 5 in)	93 kg (205 lb)	34 – 22 May 1991	Pikeville
G	72	(Taiwan)	Lin Li-Jen	1.83 m (6 ft 0 in)	85 kg (187 lb)	35 – 16 June 1990	MingDao

Head coach

- (United States) Ryan Marchand

Assistant coach(es)

- (United States) Mark Coppola
- (Taiwan) Lin Cheng-Yu

Strength & conditioning coach(es)

- (Taiwan) Chang Chung-Hsi
- (Taiwan) Liu Cheng-Yu

Athletic trainer(s)

- (Taiwan) Chiu Po-Kai
- (Taiwan) Wu Chung-Hao

Legend

- (C) Team captain
- (I) Import player
- (FS) Foreign student player
- (HP) Heritage player
- (FA) Free agent
- (DP) Unsigned draft pick
- (AI) EASL Asian import
- (S) Suspended
- Injured

- Roster
Updated: April 3, 2024

== Game log ==
=== East Asia Super League ===
==== Group stage ====
November 8
19:00 UTC+8

Boxscore

New Taipei Kings (Chinese Taipei)	90–72	(South Korea) Seoul SK Knights
Scoring by quarter: 21–29, 22–14, 26–15, 21–14
Pts: Kenny Manigault 22; Rebs: Kenny Manigault 11; Asts: Jeremy Lin 9		Pts: Jameel Warney 45; Rebs: Warney, Williams 11 each Asts: Kim Sun-hyung 4

Xinzhuang Gymnasium, New Taipei City

November 29
19:00 UTC+8

Boxscore

New Taipei Kings (Chinese Taipei)	97–92	(Philippines) Meralco Bolts
Scoring by quarter: 25–30, 20–18, 20–18, 32–26
Pts: Jeremy Lin 25; Rebs: Christian Anigwe 14; Asts: Jeremy Lin 7		Pts: Zach Lofton 35; Rebs: Banchero, Ibeh, Newsome 6 each Asts: Chris Newsome 4

Xinzhuang Gymnasium, New Taipei City

January 3
19:00 UTC+8

Boxscore

Meralco Bolts (Philippines)	77–89	(Chinese Taipei) New Taipei Kings
Scoring by quarter: 21–21, 26–21, 11–24, 19–23
Pts: Zach Lofton 20; Rebs: Prince Ibeh 7 Asts: Zach Lofton 4		Pts: Jeremy Lin 23; Rebs: Anigwe, Je. Lin 10 each Asts: Je. Lin, Manigault 4 each

PhilSports Arena, Pasig

January 10
19:00 UTC+8

Boxscore

New Taipei Kings (Chinese Taipei)	67–63	(Japan) Ryukyu Golden Kings
Scoring by quarter: 18–15, 19–14, 15–18, 15–16
Pts: Kenny Manigault 16; Rebs: Kenny Manigault 13; Asts: Jeremy Lin 6		Pts: Carl Tamayo 16; Rebs: Jack Cooley 10; Asts: Keita Imamura 6

Xinzhuang Gymnasium, New Taipei City
Attendance: 5,207

January 24
19:00 UTC+9

Boxscore

Ryukyu Golden Kings (Japan)	90–67	(Chinese Taipei) New Taipei Kings
Scoring by quarter: 18–19, 17–21, 29–14, 26–13
Pts: Allen Durham 21; Rebs: Vic Law 9 Asts: Ryuichi Kishimoto 11		Pts: Hayden Blankley 16; Rebs: Christian Anigwe 9 Asts: Lee Kai-Yan 4

Okinawa Arena, Okinawa City
Attendance: 6,769

January 31
19:00 UTC+9

Boxscore

Seoul SK Knights (South Korea)	89–57	(Chinese Taipei) New Taipei Kings
Scoring by quarter: 24–16, 17–21, 23–15, 25–5
Pts: Jameel Warney 34; Rebs: Jameel Warney 18; Asts: Yang Woo-Sub 7		Pts: Tony Mitchell 12; Rebs: Christian Anigwe 10; Asts: Joseph Lin 7

Jamsil Students' Gymnasium, Seoul

==== Final Four – semifinal ====
March 8
20:00 UTC+8

Boxscore

Chiba Jets (Japan)	92–84	(Chinese Taipei) New Taipei Kings
Scoring by quarter: 32–25, 18–22, 16–20, 26–17
Pts: Yuki Togashi 28; Rebs: Xavier Cooks 22; Asts: Yuki Togashi 5		Pts: Joseph Lin 21; Rebs: Kenny Manigault 6 Asts: Joseph Lin 5

Hoops Dome, Lapu-Lapu City

==== Final Four – third place ====
March 10
16:00 UTC+8

Boxscore

Anyang Jung Kwan Jang Red Boosters (South Korea)	78–76	(Chinese Taipei) New Taipei Kings
Scoring by quarter: 18–13, 26–20, 20–24, 14–19
Pts: Park Ji-Hoon 29; Rebs: Robert Carter 15; Asts: Choi Seong-Won 5		Pts: Kenny Manigault 18; Rebs: Kenny Manigault 10; Asts: Joseph Lin 7

Hoops Dome, Lapu-Lapu City

=== Preseason ===
2023 preseason game log
Total: 0–2 (Home: 0–1; Road: 0–1)
Preseason : 0–2 (Home: 0–1; Road: 0–1)

Game	Date	Team	Score	High points	High rebounds	High assists	Location Attendance	Record
1	October 8	Dreamers	L 99–105	Je. Lin, Preston (16)	Tony Mitchell (12)	Kenny Manigault (4)	Keelung Municipal Stadium; 3,998	0–1
2	October 9	@Steelers	L 77–91	Billy Preston (13)	Tony Mitchell (12)	Joseph Lin (5)	Keelung Municipal Stadium; 4,597	0–2

2023–24 schedule

=== Regular season ===
2023–24 game log
Total: 22–18 (home: 10–10; road: 12–8)
November : 5–0 (Home: 4–0; Road: 1–0)

Game	Date	Team	Score	High points	High rebounds	High assists	Location Attendance	Record
1	November 11	@Braves	W 96–89	Jeremy Lin (21)	Byron Mullens (12)	Je. Lin, Manigault (6)	Taipei Heping Basketball Gymnasium; 7,000	1–0
2	November 18	Lioneers	W 111–87	Jeremy Lin (26)	Byron Mullens (12)	Kenny Manigault (8)	Xinzhuang Gymnasium; 5,149	2–0
3	November 19	Pilots	W 123–113	Byron Mullens (31)	Byron Mullens (13)	Lee Kai-Yan (7)	Xinzhuang Gymnasium; 4,086	3–0
4	November 25	Pilots	W 98–92	Jeremy Lin (37)	Anigwe, Je. Lin (8)	Jeremy Lin (5)	Xinzhuang Gymnasium; 4,592	4–0
5	November 26	Steelers	W 109–93	Byron Mullens (24)	Byron Mullens (11)	Jeremy Lin (11)	Xinzhuang Gymnasium; 5,235	5–0

December : 3–4 (Home: 1–3; Road: 2–1)

Game	Date	Team	Score	High points	High rebounds	High assists	Location Attendance	Record
6	December 3	@Steelers	W 92–81	Byron Mullens (20)	Byron Mullens (13)	Joseph Lin (5)	Fengshan Arena; 4,988	6–0
7	December 9	@Pilots	W 107–86	Byron Mullens (25)	Byron Mullens (23)	Joseph Lin (7)	Taoyuan Arena; 4,288	7–0
8	December 17	@Pilots	L 90–100	Kenny Manigault (26)	Byron Mullens (14)	Joseph Lin (6)	Taoyuan Arena; 3,529	7–1
9	December 23	Braves	W 111–106	Jeremy Lin (44)	Tony Mitchell (14)	Kenny Manigault (9)	Xinzhuang Gymnasium; 6,540	8–1
10	December 24	Dreamers	L 104–120	Tony Mitchell (22)	Kenny Manigault (13)	Jeremy Lin (7)	Xinzhuang Gymnasium; 5,817	8–2
11	December 30	Lioneers	L 98–105	Jeremy Lin (19)	Christian Anigwe (11)	Lee Kai-Yan (9)	Xinzhuang Gymnasium; 5,853	8–3
12	December 31	Braves	L 96–104	Joseph Lin (21)	Kenny Manigault (11)	Kenny Manigault (8)	Xinzhuang Gymnasium; 6,540	8–4

January : 4–1 (Home: 2–0; Road: 2–1)

Game	Date	Team	Score	High points	High rebounds	High assists	Location Attendance	Record
13	January 6	@Dreamers	L 76–93	Kenny Manigault (22)	Hayden Blankley (13)	Joseph Lin (8)	Changhua County Stadium; 5,111	8–5
14	January 12	@Lioneers	W 95–80	Lin L., Manigault (17)	Kenny Manigault (15)	Joseph Lin (10)	Hsinchu County Gymnasium; 7,124	9–5
15	January 20	Dreamers	W 114–82	Jeremy Lin (43)	Kenny Manigault (18)	Joseph Lin (6)	Xinzhuang Gymnasium; 5,818	10–5
16	January 21	Steelers	W 110–97	Tony Mitchell (23)	Tony Mitchell (16)	Joseph Lin (7)	Xinzhuang Gymnasium; 4,584	11–5
17	January 28	@Steelers	W 94–83	Joseph Lin (19)	Christian Anigwe (15)	Joseph Lin (7)	Fengshan Arena; 4,253	12–5

February : 1–4 (Home: 1–2; Road: 0–2)

Game	Date	Team	Score	High points	High rebounds	High assists	Location Attendance	Record
18	February 3	@Dreamers	L 70–91	Kenny Manigault (18)	Su Shih-Hsuan (12)	Joseph Lin (7)	Changhua County Stadium; 5,600	12–6
19	February 6	Steelers	W 111–93	Joseph Lin (21)	Kenny Manigault (13)	Kenny Manigault (10)	Xinzhuang Gymnasium; 4,211	13–6
20	February 16	Lioneers	79–97	Kenny Manigault (32)	Kenny Manigault (17)	Kenny Manigault (8)	Xinzhuang Gymnasium; 4,241	13–7
21	February 18	Pilots	L 97–112	Yang Chin-Min (26)	Christian Anigwe (12)	Kenny Manigault (17)	Xinzhuang Gymnasium; 4,370	13–8
PPD	February 25	@Lioneers	Postponed					
22	February 28	@Lioneers	L 80–88	Kenny Manigault (18)	Kenny Manigault (10)	Kenny Manigault (5)	Hsinchu County Stadium; 7,400	13–9

March : 2–4 (Home: 0–3; Road: 2–1)

Game	Date	Team	Score	High points	High rebounds	High assists	Location Attendance	Record
23	March 2	@Pilots	L 87–94	Hayden Blankley (19)	Joseph Lin (9)	Joseph Lin (6)	Taoyuan Arena; 3,088	13–10
24	March 17	@Braves	W 129–104	Byron Mullens (27)	Anigwe, Mullens (10)	Joseph Lin (19)	Taipei Heping Basketball Gymnasium; 7,000	14–10
25	March 23	@Steelers	W 109–102	Davis, Manigault (20)	Christian Anigwe (12)	Joseph Lin (14)	Fengshan Arena; 2,432	15–10
26	March 26	Dreamers	L 101–103	Byron Mullens (23)	Kenny Manigault (10)	Joseph Lin (7)	Xinzhuang Gymnasium; 3,532	15–11
27	March 30	Braves	L 77–102	Austin Daye (11)	Christian Anigwe (8)	Yang Chin-Min (6)	Xinzhuang Gymnasium; 4,840	15–12
28	March 31	Dreamers	L 105–108	Joseph Lin (24)	Kenny Manigault (13)	Joseph Lin (8)	Xinzhuang Gymnasium; 3,964	15–13

April : 3–3 (Home: 1–1; Road: 2–2)

Game	Date	Team	Score	High points	High rebounds	High assists	Location Attendance	Record
29	April 6	@Braves	L 96–122	Austin Daye (19)	Austin Daye (10)	Lee, Yang (6)	Taipei Heping Basketball Gymnasium; 6,627	15–14
30	April 13	@Dreamers	W 116–94	Joseph Lin (22)	Kenny Manigault (10)	Joseph Lin (6)	Changhua County Stadium; 3,190	16–14
31	April 19	@Dreamers	L 93–97	Kenny Manigault (18)	Austin Daye (16)	Joseph Lin (11)	Intercontinental Basketball Stadium; 3,000	16–15
32	April 21	@Lioneers	W 94–72	Jeremy Lin (16)	Kenny Manigault (12)	Joseph Lin (8)	Hsinchu County Stadium; 6,203	17–15
33	April 27	Braves	L 74–102	Jeremy Lin (19)	Austin Daye (13)	Kenny Manigault (6)	Xinzhuang Gymnasium; 5,122	17–16
34	April 28	Pilots	W 94–76	Je. Lin, Manigault (16)	Austin Daye (12)	Joseph Lin (6)	Xinzhuang Gymnasium; 4,216	18–16

May : 4–2 (Home: 1–1; Road: 3–1)

Game	Date	Team	Score	High points	High rebounds	High assists	Location Attendance	Record
35	May 4	@Lioneers	W 98–88	Lewis, Jo. Lin (16)	Wendell Lewis (17)	Joseph Lin (12)	Hsinchu County Stadium; 6,004	19–16
36	May 7	@Braves	W 101–95	Jeremy Lin (27)	Daye, Lewis (9)	Joseph Lin (6)	Taipei Heping Basketball Gymnasium; 6,375	20–16
37	May 11	Steelers	W 113–101	Austin Daye (25)	Wendell Lewis (16)	Lee Kai-Yan (10)	Xinzhuang Gymnasium; 3,621	21–16
38	May 12	Lioneers	L 101–105	Hung Chih-Shan (24)	Tony Mitchell (14)	Hung Chih-Shan (11)	Xinzhuang Gymnasium; 3,645	21–17
39	May 15	@Pilots	L 90–92	Austin Daye (20)	Kenny Manigault (13)	Yang Chin-Min (5)	Taoyuan Arena; 3,072	21–18
40	May 18	@Steelers	W 121–82	Wendell Lewis (23)	Wendell Lewis (13)	Jo. Lin, Yang (6)	Fengshan Arena; 4,036	22–18

2023–24 schedule

=== Playoffs ===
2024 playoffs game log
Total: 8–3 (Home: 5–0; Road: 3–3)
Playoffs : 4–2 (Home: 3–0; Road: 1–2)

Game	Date	Team	Score	High points	High rebounds	High assists	Location Attendance	Record
1	May 24	@Dreamers	L 88–89	Jeremy Lin (25)	Kenny Manigault (9)	Yang Chin-Min (5)	Intercontinental Basketball Stadium; 3,000	1–0
2	May 26	@Dreamers	W 90–86	Kenny Manigault (17)	Wendell Lewis (11)	Joseph Lin (6)	Intercontinental Basketball Stadium; 3,000	1–1
3	May 28	Dreamers	W 96–89	Austin Daye (22)	Kenny Manigault (13)	Kenny Manigault (5)	Xinzhuang Gymnasium; 6,073	2–1
4	May 30	Dreamers	W 87–73	Kenny Manigault (21)	Kenny Manigault (17)	Joseph Lin (8)	Xinzhuang Gymnasium; 6,394	3–1
5	June 1	@Dreamers	L 76–96	Jeremy Lin (19)	Kenny Manigault (13)	Joseph Lin (6)	Intercontinental Basketball Stadium; 3,000	3–2
6	June 3	Dreamers	W 97–88	Jeremy Lin (33)	Lewis, Manigault (12)	Jeremy Lin (6)	Xinzhuang Gymnasium; 5,260	4–2

Finals : 4–1 (Home: 2–0; Road: 2–1)

Game	Date	Team	Score	High points	High rebounds	High assists	Location Attendance	Record
1	June 9	@Pilots	W 89–82	Lee Kai-Yan (18)	Wendell Lewis (11)	Jeremy Lin (5)	Taoyuan Arena; 6,470	1–0
2	June 12	@Pilots	L 70–90	Jeremy Lin (22)	Daye, Manigault (8)	Jeremy Lin (6)	Taoyuan Arena; 6,470	1–1
3	June 15	Pilots	W 83–82	Je. Lin, Jo. Lin (15)	Kenny Manigault (12)	Jeremy Lin (4)	Xinzhuang Gymnasium; 6,540	2–1
4	June 17	Pilots	W 90–82	Austin Daye (28)	Wendell Lewis (11)	Joseph Lin (11)	Xinzhuang Gymnasium; 6,540	3–1
5	June 20	@Pilots	W 103–97(OT)	Lee, Jo. Lin (17)	Austin Daye (16)	Joseph Lin (7)	Taoyuan Arena; 6,470	4–1

2023–24 schedule

== Player statistics ==
Legend
GP	Games played	MPG	Minutes per game	2P%	2-point field goal percentage
3P%	3-point field goal percentage	FT%	Free throw percentage	RPG	Rebounds per game
APG	Assists per game	SPG	Steals per game	BPG	Blocks per game
PPG	Points per game		Led the league

=== Regular season ===
Player	GP	MPG	PPG	2P%	3P%	FT%	RPG	APG	SPG	BPG
Christian Anigwe^{‡}	25	28:14	10.20	53.13%	28.57%	58.33%	8.20	0.60	0.80	0.72
Hayden Blankley^{‡}	5	25:17	13.40	34.62%	29.03%	73.33%	7.60	1.80	0.40	0.60
Chai Chen-Hao	5	02:22	0.80	66.67%	0.00%	0.00%	1.60	0.00	0.00	0.00
Chen Chun-Nan	23	10:41	1.91	27.50%	26.09%	50.00%	1.13	0.57	0.22	0.00
Chien You-Che	33	14:01	4.15	46.15%	29.79%	85.00%	1.09	0.67	0.61	0.00
Quincy Davis	5	23:33	7.20	73.68%	16.67%	40.00%	6.40	1.20	0.80	0.80
Austin Daye^{≠}	13	25:02	14.00	53.57%	50.00%	88.46%	8.46	2.00	0.85	0.85
Hung Chih-Shan	29	11:41	3.31	40.00%	43.08%	80.00%	1.07	2.10	0.24	0.00
Lee Kai-Yan	31	28:10	9.55	49.25%	30.20%	76.32%	2.61	2.58	1.19	0.13
Wendell Lewis^{≠}	11	29:07	12.27	60.40%	0.00%	76.47%	8.82	0.82	0.82	0.36
Li Wei-Ting	19	09:22	4.58	44.12%	36.73%	50.00%	0.95	0.58	0.32	0.11
Lin Chin-Pang	26	07:28	1.92	41.18%	41.18%	25.00%	1.00	0.46	0.42	0.08
Jeremy Lin	24	29:23	19.33	44.44%	43.18%	81.70%	5.17	4.38	1.63	0.46
Joseph Lin	34	33:11	12.76	44.81%	25.26%	70.59%	4.06	6.74	1.38	0.65
Lin Li-Jen	22	09:53	2.91	55.56%	24.64%	42.86%	1.32	0.27	0.18	0.00
Kenny Manigault	33	32:30	16.03	47.37%	22.82%	69.13%	9.24	5.15	2.76	0.21
Tony Mitchell	18	25:02	12.44	64.89%	38.10%	61.22%	8.56	1.17	0.50	0.83
Byron Mullens^{‡}	14	29:16	18.14	55.28%	30.12%	70.49%	10.79	1.43	1.00	1.00
Su Pei-Kai	8	06:42	1.38	25.00%	20.00%	0.00%	1.00	0.38	0.13	0.00
Su Shih-Hsuan	35	18:27	5.54	54.17%	35.21%	68.18%	4.11	0.83	0.69	0.69
Wang Po-Chih	31	10:59	3.10	40.00%	28.89%	45.45%	1.42	0.39	0.35	0.16
Yang Chin-Min	23	29:15	13.09	45.26%	33.33%	78.69%	4.65	3.00	0.83	0.04

^{‡} Waived during the season
^{≠} Acquired during the season

=== Playoffs ===
Player	GP	MPG	PPG	2P%	3P%	FT%	RPG	APG	SPG	BPG
Chai Chen-Hao	Did not play									
Chen Chun-Nan	1	02:48	0.00	0.00%	0.00%	0.00%	0.00	0.00	0.00	0.00
Chien You-Che	4	04:41	0.50	100.00%	0.00%	0.00%	0.75	0.25	0.25	0.00
Austin Daye	6	25:59	15.00	65.38%	40.00%	77.78%	6.00	1.17	0.50	1.00
Hung Chih-Shan	4	02:38	0.00	0.00%	0.00%	0.00%	0.25	0.00	0.00	0.00
Lee Kai-Yan	6	27:01	7.83	44.44%	33.33%	53.33%	2.83	1.83	1.33	0.00
Wendell Lewis	6	24:30	9.83	65.79%	0.00%	75.00%	8.17	0.17	0.83	0.67
Li Wei-Ting	1	02:48	3.00	0.00%	50.00%	0.00%	0.00	0.00	0.00	0.00
Lin Chin-Pang	4	00:37	0.00	0.00%	0.00%	0.00%	0.25	0.00	0.00	0.00
Jeremy Lin	6	38:36	19.50	53.33%	24.44%	92.31%	5.50	3.50	2.17	0.67
Joseph Lin	6	31:07	6.50	25.81%	29.17%	40.00%	3.67	5.33	0.83	0.17
Lin Li-Jen	Did not play									
Kenny Manigault	6	38:36	16.50	44.78%	33.33%	85.71%	11.83	2.83	1.67	0.50
Tony Mitchell	Did not play									
Su Pei-Kai	Did not play									
Su Shih-Hsuan	6	16:29	3.17	66.67%	12.50%	0.00%	2.33	1.17	0.67	0.33
Wang Po-Chih	2	02:04	0.00	0.00%	0.00%	0.00%	0.00	0.00	0.00	0.00
Yang Chin-Min	6	30:42	9.83	42.31%	30.56%	50.00%	4.17	3.17	0.33	0.00

=== Finals ===
Player	GP	MPG	PPG	2P%	3P%	FT%	RPG	APG	SPG	BPG
Chai Chen-Hao	Did not play									
Chen Chun-Nan	1	02:19	0.00	0.00%	0.00%	0.00%	0.00	0.00	0.00	0.00
Chien You-Che	4	07:08	2.25	0.00%	60.00%	0.00%	0.75	0.25	0.25	0.00
Austin Daye	5	34:09	13.20	43.33%	31.25%	90.91%	9.80	3.40	0.80	1.40
Hung Chih-Shan	4	09:24	3.00	0.00%	57.14%	0.00%	0.00	1.00	0.00	0.00
Lee Kai-Yan	5	37:30	14.20	45.71%	44.44%	60.00%	4.40	1.40	1.20	0.20
Wendell Lewis	5	31:44	11.40	68.42%	0.00%	33.33%	8.40	0.40	1.00	0.80
Li Wei-Ting	1	02:19	3.00	0.00%	100.00%	0.00%	0.00	0.00	0.00	0.00
Lin Chin-Pang	3	09:21	0.67	33.33%	0.00%	0.00%	1.00	0.67	0.00	0.00
Jeremy Lin	4	35:23	17.00	46.15%	14.81%	95.24%	6.25	4.25	2.25	1.50
Joseph Lin	5	30:09	9.20	31.58%	34.48%	80.00%	1.20	5.00	1.60	0.60
Lin Li-Jen	Did not play									
Kenny Manigault	3	26:07	12.00	34.78%	45.45%	83.33%	8.33	2.00	2.00	0.00
Tony Mitchell	2	13:09	2.50	25.00%	0.00%	100.00%	5.50	1.50	0.00	1.50
Su Pei-Kai	Did not play									
Su Shih-Hsuan	5	12:40	3.20	40.00%	37.50%	100.00%	4.80	0.20	0.60	0.40
Wang Po-Chih	1	02:19	0.00	0.00%	0.00%	0.00%	1.00	0.00	0.00	0.00
Yang Chin-Min	5	29:16	8.80	30.77%	33.33%	58.33%	4.00	1.20	0.60	0.20

== Transactions ==
=== Re-signed ===
Date	Player	Contract terms	Ref.
June 18, 2023	Kenny Manigault	—	
July 21, 2023	Hung Chih-Shan	—	
August 4, 2023	Lin Li-Jen	—	

=== Free agency ===
==== Additions ====
Date	Player	Contract terms	Former team	Ref.
July 4, 2023	Wang Po-Chih	—	Kaohsiung 17LIVE Steelers	
July 28, 2023	Su Pei Kai	—	NTUA Sharks	
September 8, 2023	Billy Preston	—	(South Africa) Cape Town Tigers	
September 11, 2023	Tony Mitchell	—	(Venezuela) Cocodrilos de Caracas	
September 14, 2023	Jeremy Lin	1+1-year contract, worth unknown	Kaohsiung 17LIVE Steelers	
September 22, 2023	Hayden Blankley	—	(Australia) Bankstown Bruins	
November 2, 2023	Christian Anigwe	—	(United States) UC Davis Aggies	
November 10, 2023	Chai Chen-Hao	—	Taiwan Beer	
February 26, 2024	Austin Daye	—	(Italy) Victoria Libertas Pallacanestro	
April 3, 2024	Wendell Lewis	—	(Indonesia) Rajawali Medan	

==== Subtractions ====
Date	Player	Reason	New team	Ref.
June 30, 2023	Kao Cheng-En	contract expired	Tainan TSG GhostHawks	
June 30, 2023	Li Ruei-Ci	contract expired	Kaohsiung 17LIVE Steelers	
June 30, 2023	Lin Shih-Hsuan	contract expired	Yulon Luxgen Dinos	
June 30, 2023	Omar Niang	contract expired	Bank of Taiwan	
June 30, 2023	Tseng Yu-Hao	contract expired	—	
June 30, 2023	Yang Hsing-Chih	contract expired	—	
October 24, 2023	Billy Preston	waived	(South Africa) Cape Town Tigers	
March 30, 2024	Byron Mullens	waived	(Canada) Winnipeg Sea Bears	
April 3, 2024	Christian Anigwe	waived	—	
April 3, 2024	Hayden Blankley	waived	(Australia) Bankstown Bruins	

== Awards ==
=== Finals awards ===
Recipient	Award	Ref.
New Taipei Kings	2024 PLG Champion	
Lee Kai-yan	Finals Most Valuable Player	

=== End-of-season awards ===
Recipient	Award	Ref.
Joseph Lin	Assists Leader	
Joseph Lin	Best Dressed of the Year	
Joseph Lin	All-PLG 2nd Team	
Kenny Manigault	Steals Leader	

=== Players of the Week ===
Week	Recipient	Date awarded	Ref.
Week 1	Joseph Lin	November 11 - November 12	
Week 3	Jeremy Lin	November 25 - November 26	
Week 13	Li Wei-Ting	February 3 - February 6	
Week 22	Lin Li-Jen	April 5 - April 7	
Week 26	Jeremy Lin	May 4 - May 7	

=== Players of the Month ===
Recipient	Month awarded	Ref.
Jeremy Lin	November	

=== EASL awards ===
Recipient	Award	Ref.
Kenny Manigault	November Player of the Month	
Jeremy Lin	All-EASL Team	
