= 2024–25 Hsinchu Toplus Lioneers season =

Taiwanese professional basketball season

- President: Chen Mei-Ling
- General Manager: Chang Shu-Jen
- Head Coach: Milan Mitrovic (contract terminated); Seng Hsin-Han (interim); Wesam Al-Sous
- Arena: Hsinchu County Stadium

TPBL results
- Record: 12–24 (33.3%)
- Place: 7th
- Playoffs finish: Did not qualify

Player records
- Points: Earl Clark 18.0
- Rebounds: Kennedy Meeks 12.0
- Assists: Kao Kuo-Hao 3.9

The 2024–25 Hsinchu Toplus Lioneers season was the franchise's fifth season, its first season in the Taiwan Professional Basketball League (TPBL).

The Lioneers were coached by Milan Mitrovic in his second year as head coach. On December 6, 2024, the Lioneers announced to terminate contract relationship with Milan Mitrovic, and named Seng Hsin-Han, the assistant coach of the Hsinchu Toplus Lioneers, as their interim head coach. On December 17, the Lioneers hired Wesam Al-Sous as their new head coach.

== Draft ==
| Round | Pick | Player | Position(s) | School / club team |
|---|---|---|---|---|
| 1 | 2 | Tsai Cheng-Kang | Forward | UCH |

- Reference：

== Roster ==
2024–25 Hsinchu Toplus Lioneers roster
Players
Coaches

| Pos. | No. | Nat. | Name | Ht. | Wt. | Age | From |
|---|---|---|---|---|---|---|---|
| G | 0 | (Taiwan) | Li Han-Sheng | 1.77 m (5 ft 10 in) | 76 kg (168 lb) | 30 – 24 October 1994 | NTNU |
| F | 1 | (United States) | Landers Nolley (I) | 2.01 m (6 ft 7 in) | 99 kg (218 lb) | 25 – 5 March 2000 | Cincinnati |
| G | 2 | (Taiwan) | Chiang Kuang-Chien | 1.84 m (6 ft 0 in) | 81 kg (179 lb) | 27 – 7 May 1998 | NTUA |
| G | 3 | (Taiwan) | Wang Tzu-Kang | 1.83 m (6 ft 0 in) | 73 kg (161 lb) | 32 – 27 January 1993 | NKNU |
| G | 4 | (Taiwan) | Kao Kuo-Hao | 1.80 m (5 ft 11 in) | 76 kg (168 lb) | 26 – 22 September 1998 | Southeast Missouri State |
| F | 6 | (United States) | Earl Clark (I) | 2.09 m (6 ft 10 in) | 106 kg (234 lb) | 37 – 17 January 1988 | Louisville |
| G | 7 | (Taiwan) | Tseng Po-Yu | 1.84 m (6 ft 0 in) | 88 kg (194 lb) | 28 – 3 December 1996 | MDU |
| F | 8 | (Taiwan) | Chu Yun-Hao | 1.95 m (6 ft 5 in) | 94 kg (207 lb) | 27 – 3 November 1997 | UCH |
| G | 9 | (Taiwan) | Tien Hao | 1.74 m (5 ft 9 in) | 70 kg (154 lb) | 26 – 16 September 1998 | NCCU |
| F | 10 | (United States) | Kennedy Meeks (I) | 2.08 m (6 ft 10 in) | 120 kg (265 lb) | 30 – 5 February 1995 | North Carolina |
| F | 11 | (Taiwan) | Hsiao Shun-Yi (C) | 1.93 m (6 ft 4 in) | 86 kg (190 lb) | 32 – 23 October 1992 | NTUA |
| F | 12 | (Taiwan) | Lee Chia-Jui | 2.00 m (6 ft 7 in) | 97 kg (214 lb) | 30 – 4 December 1994 | KLCIVS |
| F | 14 | (United States) | Nate Laszewski (I) | 2.08 m (6 ft 10 in) | 107 kg (236 lb) | 25 – 19 July 1999 | Notre Dame |
| F | 20 | (Taiwan) | Chou Po-Hsun | 1.97 m (6 ft 6 in) | 94 kg (207 lb) | 34 – 6 March 1991 | MDU |
| F | 35 | (Taiwan) | Tsai Cheng-Kang | 1.97 m (6 ft 6 in) | 95 kg (209 lb) | 22 – 8 November 2002 | UCH |
| G | 42 | (Taiwan) | Lu Kuan-Hsuan | 1.84 m (6 ft 0 in) | 88 kg (194 lb) | 30 – 2 April 1995 | NTNU |
| C | 52 | (Macau) | Iong Ngai-San (FS) | 2.00 m (6 ft 7 in) | 99 kg (218 lb) | 29 – 9 February 1996 | NTNU |
| F | 75 | (Taiwan) | Lee Chi-Wei | 1.92 m (6 ft 4 in) | 87 kg (192 lb) | 32 – 8 April 1993 | MDU |

Head coach

- (Jordan) (United States) Wesam Al-Sous

Assistant coach(es)

- (Taiwan) Seng Hsin-Han
- (Taiwan) Chen Tse-Yu
- (Taiwan) Wang Te-Yung
- (Taiwan) Lu Chi-Min
- (Taiwan) Sung Yu-Hsuan

Athletic trainer(s)

- (Taiwan) Huang Chien-Yuan
- (Taiwan) Ou Po-Hung

Physician(s)

- (Taiwan) Huang Chien-Yuan
- (Taiwan) Ou Po-Hung

Team manager

- (Taiwan) Chang Shu-Jen

Legend

- (C) Team captain
- (I) Import player
- (FS) Foreign student
- Injured

- Roster
Updated: May 11, 2025

== Summer League ==
Iong Ngai-San joined to the team in these summer league games.

=== Game log ===
Recap

August 22, 2024
14:00 (UTC+8)

| Hsinchu Toplus Lioneers | 79–68 | New Taipei CTBC DEA |

CTBC administration building basketball court, Taipei City

Recap

August 25, 2024
14:00 (UTC+8)

| Hsinchu Toplus Lioneers | 84–66 | Taoyuan Taiwan Beer Leopards |

CTBC administration building basketball court, Taipei City

Recap

September 7, 2024
14:00 (UTC+8)

| Taipei Taishin Mars | 80–87 | Hsinchu Toplus Lioneers |

CTBC administration building basketball court, Taipei City

Recap

September 11, 2024
14:00 (UTC+8)

| Kaohsiung Aquas | 85–82 | Hsinchu Toplus Lioneers |

CTBC administration building basketball court, Taipei City

== Lioneers Masters Game ==
Iong Ngai-San joined to the team in Lioneers Masters Game.

=== Game log ===
Recap

August 31, 2024
17:00 (UTC+8)

| Hsinchu Toplus Lioneers | 75–68 | Levanga Hokkaido |

Hsinchu County Stadium, Hsinchu County

Recap

September 1, 2024
17:00 (UTC+8)

| Taipei Taishin Mars | 89–94 | Hsinchu Toplus Lioneers |

Hsinchu County Stadium, Hsinchu County

== International friendship match ==
September 15, 2024
13:30 (UTC+8)

| Goyang Sono Skygunners | 124–101 | Hsinchu Toplus Lioneers |

Hsinchu Kuang-Fu Senior High School Gymnasium, Hsinchu City

== Preseason ==
=== Game log ===
2024 preseason game log
Total: 1–2 (home: 1–2; road: 0–0)
Preseason : 1–2 (home: 1–2; road: 0–0)

| Game | Date | Team | Score | High points | High rebounds | High assists | Location Attendance | Record |
|---|---|---|---|---|---|---|---|---|
| 1 | October 6 | Aquas | L 78–102 | Kao Kuo-Hao (12) | Matej Radunič (9) | Earl Clark (2); Matej Radunič (2); Tseng Po-Yu (2); Chu Yun-Hao (2) | Taichung Intercontinental Basketball Stadium; 2,807 | 0–1 |
| 2 | October 12 | Mars | W 111–108 | Earl Clark (21) | Kennedy Meeks (15) | Kao Kuo-Hao (6) | Hsinchu County Stadium; 3,169 | 1–1 |
| 3 | October 13 | Leopards | L 98–99 | Kennedy Meeks (18) | Matej Radunič (12) | Tseng Po-Yu (5) | Hsinchu County Stadium; 3,668 | 1–2 |

Color： Win Lose
Schedule

== Regular season ==
=== Standings ===
| Pos | Team | Pld | W | L | PCT | GB | Qualification |
|---|---|---|---|---|---|---|---|
| 1 | New Taipei Kings | 36 | 26 | 10 | .722 | — | Advance to semifinals |
| 2 | Formosa Dreamers | 36 | 21 | 15 | .583 | 5 | Advance to semifinals |
| 3 | Kaohsiung Aquas | 36 | 19 | 17 | .528 | 7 | Advance to semifinals |
| 4 | Taipei Taishin Mars | 36 | 16 | 20 | .444 | 10 | Advance to play-in |
| 5 | Taoyuan Taiwan Beer Leopards | 36 | 16 | 20 | .444 | 10 | Advance to play-in |
| 6 | New Taipei CTBC DEA | 36 | 16 | 20 | .444 | 10 | |
| 7 | Hsinchu Toplus Lioneers | 36 | 12 | 24 | .333 | 14 | |

Source: TPBL

=== Game log ===
2024–25 regular season game log
Total: 12–24 (home: 10–8; road: 2–16)
October : 0–2 (home: 0–0; road: 0–2)

| Game | Date | Team | Score | High points | High rebounds | High assists | Location Attendance | Record |
|---|---|---|---|---|---|---|---|---|
| 1 | October 20 | @ Aquas | L 79–93 | Earl Clark (20) | Kennedy Meeks (9) | Kao Kuo-Hao (3); Tseng Po-Yu (3) | Kaohsiung Arena; 4,164 | 0–1 |
| 2 | October 26 | @ Kings | L 93–122 | Earl Clark (28) | Kennedy Meeks (11) | Kao Kuo-Hao (6) | Xinzhuang Gymnasium; 3,581 | 0–2 |

November : 2–2 (home: 1–1; road: 1–1)

| Game | Date | Team | Score | High points | High rebounds | High assists | Location Attendance | Record |
|---|---|---|---|---|---|---|---|---|
| 3 | November 2 | @ Mars | W 79–76 | Earl Clark (22) | Michael Holyfield (14) | Kao Kuo-Hao (6) | Taipei Heping Basketball Gymnasium; 4,219 | 1–2 |
| 4 | November 9 | Leopards | W 99–73 | Earl Clark (25) | Michael Holyfield (15) | Kao Kuo-Hao (9) | Hsinchu County Stadium; 5,721 | 2–2 |
| 5 | November 10 | Mars | L 84–94 | Earl Clark (22) | Michael Holyfield (9) | Kao Kuo-Hao (3); Lee Chi-Wei (3); Earl Clark (3); Li Han-Sheng (3) | Hsinchu County Stadium; 5,433 | 2–3 |
| 6 | November 30 | @ DEA | L 84–85 | Earl Clark (28) | Earl Clark (12) | Kao Kuo-Hao (6) | Xinzhuang Gymnasium; 5,195 | 2–4 |

December : 1–5 (home: 0–2; road: 1–3)

| Game | Date | Team | Score | High points | High rebounds | High assists | Location Attendance | Record |
|---|---|---|---|---|---|---|---|---|
| 7 | December 4 | @ Leopards | L 89–112 | Earl Clark (21) | Li Han-Sheng (6); Michael Holyfield (6) | Lu Kuan-Hsuan (6); Kao Kuo-Hao (6) | Taoyuan Arena; 2,138 | 2–5 |
| 8 | December 7 | @ Kings | L 78–96 | Kennedy Meeks (15) | Earl Clark (14) | Kao Kuo-Hao (5) | Xinzhuang Gymnasium; 4,349 | 2–6 |
| 9 | December 13 | @ Dreamers | L 81–96 | Earl Clark (22) | Earl Clark (12) | Lu Kuan-Hsuan (5) | Taichung Intercontinental Basketball Stadium; 2,618 | 2–7 |
| 10 | December 21 | @ DEA | W 93–78 | Earl Clark (30) | Earl Clark (18) | Lee Chi-Wei (4) | Xinzhuang Gymnasium; 3,785 | 3–7 |
| 11 | December 28 | DEA | L 91–97 | Earl Clark (18) | Kennedy Meeks (16) | Kao Kuo-Hao (5); Lee Chi-Wei (5) | Hsinchu County Stadium; 4,181 | 3–8 |
| 12 | December 29 | Leopards | L 102–106 | Kao Kuo-Hao (26) | Kao Kuo-Hao (12) | Kao Kuo-Hao (6) | Hsinchu County Stadium; 4,017 | 3–9 |

January : 2–4 (home: 2–3; road: 0–1)

| Game | Date | Team | Score | High points | High rebounds | High assists | Location Attendance | Record |
|---|---|---|---|---|---|---|---|---|
| 13 | January 4 | Kings | L 89–98 | Kao Kuo-Hao (20) | Kennedy Meeks (21) | Kao Kuo-Hao (5) | Hsinchu County Stadium; 5,077 | 3–10 |
| 14 | January 5 | DEA | L 75–83 | Kao Kuo-Hao (16) | Kennedy Meeks (18) | Kao Kuo-Hao (6) | Hsinchu County Stadium; 3,447 | 3–11 |
| 15 | January 12 | @ Aquas | L 78–103 | Lu Kuan-Hsuan (21) | Michael Holyfield (14); Kennedy Meeks (14) | Kao Kuo-Hao (3); Dar Tucker (3) | Kaohsiung Arena; 4,015 | 3–12 |
| 16 | January 18 | Mars | W 117–105 | Landers Nolley (41) | Earl Clark (13) | Landers Nolley (5) | Hsinchu County Stadium; 3,822 | 4–12 |
| 17 | January 19 | Kings | L 106–114 | Landers Nolley (44) | Earl Clark (11) | Landers Nolley (8) | Hsinchu County Stadium; 4,953 | 4–13 |
| 18 | January 22 | Dreamers | W 106–99 | Landers Nolley (30) | Kennedy Meeks (17) | Landers Nolley (8) | Hsinchu County Stadium; 4,051 | 5–13 |

February : 1–1 (home: 1–0; road: 0–1)

| Game | Date | Team | Score | High points | High rebounds | High assists | Location Attendance | Record |
|---|---|---|---|---|---|---|---|---|
| 19 | February 5 | Aquas | W 97–91 | Landers Nolley (34) | Kennedy Meeks (15) | Kao Kuo-Hao (6) | Hsinchu County Stadium; 3,578 | 6–13 |
| 20 | February 9 | @ Mars | L 90–100 | Landers Nolley (30) | Kennedy Meeks (13) | Kao Kuo-Hao (6) | Taipei Heping Basketball Gymnasium; 3,853 | 6–14 |

March : 2–5 (home: 2–1; road: 0–4)

| Game | Date | Team | Score | High points | High rebounds | High assists | Location Attendance | Record |
|---|---|---|---|---|---|---|---|---|
| 21 | March 1 | @ Leopards | L 82–98 | Earl Clark (25) | Earl Clark (12) | Li Han-Sheng (7) | Taoyuan Arena; 5,531 | 6–15 |
| 22 | March 8 | @ Aquas | L 88–104 | Landers Nolley (31) | Landers Nolley (14) | Li Han-Sheng (5); Landers Nolley (5) | Kaohsiung Arena; 5,081 | 6–16 |
| 23 | March 12 | Leopards | W 94–77 | Earl Clark (28) | Landers Nolley (9) | Li Han-Sheng (5); Lu Kuan-Hsuan (5) | Hsinchu County Stadium; 3,078 | 7–16 |
| 24 | March 15 | Kings | L 111–114 | Landers Nolley (29) | Landers Nolley (7) | Landers Nolley (9) | Hsinchu County Stadium; 5,411 | 7–17 |
| 25 | March 16 | Aquas | W 116–103 | Landers Nolley (44) | Kennedy Meeks (11) | Landers Nolley (6) | Hsinchu County Stadium; 4,791 | 8–17 |
| 26 | March 23 | @ Dreamers | L 105–110 | Landers Nolley (29) | Landers Nolley (11); Nate Laszewski (11) | Landers Nolley (5); Li Han-Sheng (5) | Taichung Intercontinental Basketball Stadium; 2,862 | 8–18 |
| 27 | March 30 | @ Mars | L 98–117 | Landers Nolley (23); Kennedy Meeks (23) | Kennedy Meeks (14) | Landers Nolley (8) | Taipei Heping Basketball Gymnasium; 3,827 | 8–19 |

April : 2–4 (home: 2–1; road: 0–3)

| Game | Date | Team | Score | High points | High rebounds | High assists | Location Attendance | Record |
|---|---|---|---|---|---|---|---|---|
| 28 | April 5 | Dreamers | W 107–90 | Landers Nolley (30) | Nate Laszewski (10) | Landers Nolley (10) | Hsinchu County Stadium; 5,091 | 9–19 |
| 29 | April 6 | DEA | L 91–97 | Li Han-Sheng (17) | Nate Laszewski (13) | Li Han-Sheng (7) | Hsinchu County Stadium; 3,547 | 9–20 |
| 30 | April 9 | Mars | W 103–92 | Landers Nolley (31) | Kennedy Meeks (14) | Landers Nolley (6) | Hsinchu County Stadium; 3,047 | 10–20 |
| 31 | April 12 | @ Kings | L 100–111 | Landers Nolley (25); Kennedy Meeks (25) | Kennedy Meeks (15) | Landers Nolley (11) | Xinzhuang Gymnasium; 4,774 | 10–21 |
| 32 | April 19 | @ Leopards | L 83–95 | Kao Kuo-Hao (23) | Kennedy Meeks (13) | Li Han-Sheng (5); Kao Kuo-Hao (5) | Taoyuan Arena; 6,218 | 10–22 |
| 33 | April 25 | @ DEA | L 101–103 (OT) | Landers Nolley (35) | Kennedy Meeks (18) | Landers Nolley (8) | Xinzhuang Gymnasium; 3,174 | 10–23 |

May : 2–1 (home: 2–0; road: 0–1)

| Game | Date | Team | Score | High points | High rebounds | High assists | Location Attendance | Record |
|---|---|---|---|---|---|---|---|---|
| 34 | May 3 | @ Dreamers | L 89–99 | Landers Nolley (20) | Kennedy Meeks (19) | Li Han-Sheng (5) | Taichung Intercontinental Basketball Stadium; 2,439 | 10–24 |
| 35 | May 10 | Dreamers | W 106–79 | Landers Nolley (30) | Kennedy Meeks (13) | Kao Kuo-Hao (5) | Hsinchu County Stadium; 5,288 | 11–24 |
| 36 | May 11 | Aquas | W 118–99 | Landers Nolley (39) | Landers Nolley (10); Nate Laszewski (10); Kennedy Meeks (10) | Landers Nolley (10) | Hsinchu County Stadium; 4,312 | 12–24 |

Color： Win Lose
Schedule

== Player statistics ==
Legend
| GP | Games played | MPG | Minutes per game | FG% | Field goal percentage |
| 3P% | 3-point field goal percentage | FT% | Free throw percentage | RPG | Rebounds per game |
| APG | Assists per game | SPG | Steals per game | BPG | Blocks per game |
| PPG | Points per game | | Led the league |

=== Regular season ===
| Player | GP | MPG | PPG | FG% | 3P% | FT% | RPG | APG | SPG | BPG |
|---|---|---|---|---|---|---|---|---|---|---|
| Li Han-Sheng | 30 | 20:46 | 5.9 | 37.3% | 33.0% | 76.5% | 2.3 | 2.8 | 1.1 | 0.0 |
| Landers Nolley^{≠} | 21 | 38:18 | 29.1 | 45.2% | 33.1% | 75.0% | 8.2 | 6.0 | 2.2 | 0.8 |
| Chiang Kuang-Chien | 5 | 3:58 | 0.8 | 0.0% | 0.0% | 66.7% | 0.4 | 0.0 | 0.0 | 0.0 |
| Wang Tzu-Kang | 16 | 7:50 | 1.8 | 29.7% | 24.0% | 33.3% | 1.3 | 0.2 | 0.3 | 0.0 |
| Kao Kuo-Hao | 33 | 27:07 | 10.6 | 37.4% | 31.7% | 72.9% | 3.2 | 3.9 | 1.5 | 0.1 |
| Earl Clark | 23 | 35:06 | 18.0 | 39.9% | 31.7% | 78.4% | 8.9 | 1.7 | 1.7 | 0.9 |
| Tseng Po-Yu | 19 | 12:17 | 3.2 | 39.1% | 0.0% | 68.8% | 0.9 | 1.7 | 0.8 | 0.0 |
| Chu Yun-Hao | 29 | 18:09 | 4.9 | 31.2% | 25.9% | 84.2% | 1.9 | 0.8 | 0.4 | 0.1 |
| Tien Hao | 12 | 12:11 | 4.0 | 34.9% | 58.8% | 40.0% | 0.8 | 1.6 | 0.7 | 0.1 |
| Kennedy Meeks | 31 | 28:09 | 14.5 | 49.2% | 34.1% | 68.1% | 12.0 | 1.5 | 1.5 | 0.7 |
| Hsiao Shun-Yi | 33 | 20:02 | 6.6 | 45.0% | 18.4% | 73.6% | 1.9 | 0.9 | 0.8 | 0.2 |
| Lee Chia-Jui | 4 | 4:04 | 0.5 | 25.0% | 0.0% | 0.0% | 0.5 | 0.0 | 0.0 | 0.3 |
| Matej Radunič^{‡} | 1 | 25:49 | 12.0 | 50.0% | 50.0% | 25.0% | 10.0 | 3.0 | 0.0 | 0.0 |
| Nate Laszewski^{≠} | 15 | 30:05 | 12.7 | 45.0% | 30.4% | 62.0% | 8.3 | 1.4 | 1.3 | 0.4 |
| Chou Po-Hsun | 18 | 9:10 | 1.4 | 56.3% | 20.0% | 50.0% | 1.3 | 0.3 | 0.3 | 0.0 |
| Tsai Cheng-Kang | 29 | 12:52 | 4.1 | 40.5% | 35.0% | 58.3% | 1.9 | 0.9 | 0.7 | 0.3 |
| Lu Kuan-Hsuan | 26 | 27:09 | 9.7 | 46.4% | 36.8% | 83.3% | 1.7 | 2.2 | 1.0 | 0.0 |
| Julian Gamble^{≠‡} | 2 | 22:10 | 6.0 | 41.7% | 0.0% | 50.0% | 7.0 | 0.5 | 1.5 | 1.0 |
| Iong Ngai-San | 2 | 2:51 | 1.0 | 100.0% | 0.0% | 0.0% | 0.5 | 0.0 | 0.0 | 1.5 |
| Michael Holyfield^{‡} | 11 | 24:31 | 7.5 | 46.4% | 0.0% | 48.4% | 10.3 | 0.5 | 0.8 | 0.9 |
| Lee Chi-Wei | 36 | 22:17 | 4.0 | 28.8% | 22.0% | 67.9% | 1.9 | 0.9 | 0.6 | 0.3 |
| Dar Tucker^{≠‡} | 4 | 22:02 | 14.0 | 34.5% | 14.3% | 51.7% | 5.5 | 2.0 | 0.3 | 0.0 |

^{‡} Left during the season
^{≠} Acquired during the season

- Reference：

== Transactions ==
=== Overview ===
Players added

Via draft

- Tsai Cheng-Kang

Via free agency

- Julian Gamble
- Nate Laszewski
- Lee Chi-Wei
- Li Han-Sheng
- Kennedy Meeks
- Landers Nolley
- Matej Radunič
- Dar Tucker
Players lost

Via free agency

- Deyonta Davis
- Jamarcus Mearidy

Waived

- Michael Efevberha
- Julian Gamble
- Michael Holyfield
- Liu Kuang-Shang
- Matej Radunič
- Shih Yen-Tsung
- Dar Tucker

Retirement

- Lu Chi-Min
- Sung Yu-Hsuan

=== Free agency ===
==== Re-signed ====
| Date | Player | Contract terms | Ref. |
|---|---|---|---|
| July 12, 2024 | Tseng Po-Yu | 3-year contract, worth unknown | |
| August 21, 2024 | Michael Holyfield | —N/a | |
| August 22, 2024 | Michael Efevberha | —N/a | |
| September 13, 2024 | Earl Clark | —N/a | |

==== Additions ====
| Date | Player | Contract terms | Former team | Ref. |
|---|---|---|---|---|
| July 3, 2024 | Lee Chi-Wei | —N/a | Taiwan Beer Leopards | |
| July 10, 2024 | Li Han-Sheng | —N/a | (Taiwan) Tainan TSG GhostHawks | |
| July 30, 2024 | Tsai Cheng-Kang | —N/a | (Taiwan) UCH | |
| August 12, 2024 | Matej Radunič | —N/a | (Italy) Herons Basket Montecatini | |
| October 1, 2024 | Kennedy Meeks | —N/a | (Taiwan) Taoyuan Pauian Pilots | |
| December 10, 2024 | Julian Gamble | —N/a | (Mexico) Lobos Plateados de la BUAP | |
| December 23, 2024 | Dar Tucker | —N/a | (Mexico) Mineros de Zacatecas | |
| January 15, 2025 | Landers Nolley | —N/a | (Greece) Aris Midea | |
| February 28, 2025 | Nate Laszewski | —N/a | (Greece) Aris Midea | |

==== Subtractions ====
| Date | Player | Reason | New team | Ref. |
|---|---|---|---|---|
| July 1, 2024 | Jamarcus Mearidy | Contract expired | (Taiwan) Yankey Ark | |
| July 31, 2024 | Sung Yu-Hsuan | Retirement | (Taiwan) Hsinchu Toplus Lioneers assistant strength and conditioning coach | |
| August 19, 2024 | Shih Yen-Tsung | Contract terminated | Permanent ban by CTBA | |
| August 26, 2024 | Liu Kuang-Shang | Contract terminated | (Taiwan) Yulon | |
| August 28, 2024 | Lu Chi-Min | Retirement | (Taiwan) Hsinchu Toplus Lioneers assistant coach | |
| September 13, 2024 | Deyonta Davis | Contract expired | —N/a | |
| October 8, 2024 | Michael Efevberha | Contract terminated | (Taiwan) New Taipei Kings | |
| November 21, 2024 | Matej Radunič | Contract terminated | (Italy) Virtus Roma | |
| January 3, 2025 | Julian Gamble | Contract terminated | (United States) Raleigh Firebirds | |
| February 12, 2025 | Dar Tucker | Contract terminated → Retirement | —N/a | |
| March 13, 2025 | Michael Holyfield | Contract terminated | (Israel) Maccabi Ra'anana | |

== Awards ==
=== Yearly awards ===
| Recipient | Award | Ref. |
|---|---|---|
| Hsinchu Toplus Lioneers | Home-Court of the Year | |

=== Player of the Week ===
| Week | Recipient | Award | Ref. |
|---|---|---|---|
| 12 | Landers Nolley | Week 12 Player of the Week | |
| 17 | Landers Nolley | Week 17 Player of the Week | |
| 25 | Landers Nolley | Week 25 Player of the Week | |

=== Player of the Month ===
| Month | Recipient | Award | Ref. |
|---|---|---|---|
| January & February | Landers Nolley | January & February Player of the Month (import) | |
