= Videoland Television Network =

Taiwanese television network

- Type: Nationwide cable TV network
- Branding: Videoland
- Country: Republic of China (Taiwan)
- First air date: 1992
- Availability: Taiwan
- Founded: 1983
- Official website: www.vl.com.tw (in Chinese)

Videoland Television Network (Chinese: 緯來電視網; pinyin: Wěilái Diànshì Wǎng) is a cable television network program provider in Taiwan, founded in 1983 by Koos Group. Videoland is one of Taiwan's major satellite television providers, offering seven channels of programming. Videoland is also sales agent for the Pili Channel and the Discovery Channel.

Videoland's operations include an Engineering Division, a Programming Division and an Advertising Division as well as an Advertising Sales Division which is responsible for advertising sales for each of the television channels. In addition, Ho-wei Communications handles sales to system operators throughout Taiwan. Together these various units make up a complete package of television programming.

Videoland ventured outside the area of channel operations with the Videoland Hunters of the local SBL basketball league in 2004. The team serves as a source of program materials for the Videoland Sports Channel and has been a key factor in promoting the development of sports and recreation in Taiwan.

Videoland is also one of the official media partner of National Basketball Association (NBA) and holding exclusive broadcasting rights for all media in Taiwan during 2014–2022, and again from 2025-26 season.
