= Kenny Manigault =

American basketball player (born 1991)

No. 55 – Fukushima Firebonds
- Position: Small forward
- League: B2 League

Personal information
- Born: May 22, 1991 (age 35) Summerville, South Carolina, U.S.
- Listed height: 6 ft 5 in (1.96 m)
- Listed weight: 205 lb (93 kg)

Career information
- High school: Pinewood Preparatory School (Summerville, South Carolina)
- College: Wichita State (2009–2010); USC Aiken (2010–2011); Pikeville (2013–2015)
- NBA draft: 2015: undrafted
- Playing career: 2016–present

Career history
- 2016: Goldfields Giants
- 2016–2017: AZS Koszalin
- 2017–2019: Tampereen Pyrintö
- 2019–2020: Macau Black Bears
- 2020: Elitzur Yavne
- 2021: Fraser Valley Bandits
- 2021–2022: Helsinki Seagulls
- 2022–2025: New Taipei Kings
- 2025–present: Fukushima Firebonds

Career highlights
- Finnish Cup winner (2022); P. League+ champion (2024); TPBL champion (2025); All-TPBL Second Team (2025); TPBL All-Defensive First Team (2025); P. League+ Second Team (2025); 2× P. League+ steal leader (2023, 2024); SBL All-Star (2016); NABC NAIA DI Player of the Year (2015); NAIA All-American (2015)

Kenneth Alan Manigault Jr. (born May 22, 1991) is an American professional basketball player for the Fukushima Firebonds of the B2 League. Listed at 6 ft 5 in (1.96 m), he plays at the small forward position.

== High school career ==
Manigault attended Pinewood Preparatory School for four years, and his team won the state championship for four consecutive years. He was named SCISA Player of the Year.

== College career ==
On August 6, 2008, Manigault committed to Wichita State University. After one year at Wichita State, he transferred to the University of South Carolina-Aiken, but parted ways with the school after only playing in seven games. In his last year of college (2014-2015), Manigault represented the University of Pikeville in the NAIA, averaging 19 points, 7 rebounds, 3 assists, and 2 steals per game, and was named NAIA Player of the Year.

== Professional career ==
=== Early career ===
Manigault's professional career began in Australia with the Goldfields Giants of the State Basketball League in the 2016 season. In September 2016, he spent a month on trial before signing a contract with AZS Koszalin until the end of the season. In July 2017, Manigault joined Tampereen Pyrintö. In April 2018, he renewed his contract with the team. On August 11, 2019, Manigault joined the Macau Black Bears of the ASEAN Basketball League. On August 31, 2020, he was signed by Elitzur Yavne and was released by them on December 2. On June 10, 2021, Manigault joined Fraser Valley Bandits. On October 30, he joined the Helsinki Seagulls.

=== New Taipei Kings ===
On October 29, 2022, Manigault signed with the New Taipei Kings of the P. LEAGUE+. On November 12, he made his PLG debut with 19 points, 6 rebounds, 5 assists, and 4 steals. On March 11, 2023, Manigault played 40 minutes and 13 seconds in the home game against Formosa Taishin Dreamers, and scored 22 points, 10 rebounds, 13 assists, and 10 steals, which was the first PLG record of four goals. On May 9, he scored 26 points, 16 rebounds, and 10 assists. Manigault played in 31 regular season games, averaging 18.29 points, 9.42 rebounds, 6.03 assists, and 3.52 steals per game. He also won the season's steals title with an average of 3.52 steals per game and won the second team of the year honors. On June 10, he scored a triple-double with 16 points, 18 rebounds, and 10 assists in Game 4 of the finals.

On June 18, 2023, New Taipei City Kings general manager James Mao announced that the team had re-signed Manigault to a one-year deal. On August 5, 2024 the Kings re-signed Manigault to another one-year deal. On January 21, 2025, he scored a triple-double with 17 points, 10 rebounds, and 10 assists in the East Asia Super League (EASL) game against Busan KCC Egis. In January, Manigault averaged 16 points, 10.5 rebounds, 7 assists, and 4.5 steals per game. On January 27, he was selected as the EASL Player of the Month and the Team of the Month for January 2024-25. On March 22, Manigault scored 15 points, 12 rebounds, and 10 assists in the match against Taipei Taishin Mars. In the 2024-25 season, he was selected to the TPBL's annual defensive first team and annual second team. On July 5, the New Taipei Kings announced that Manigault will be leaving the Kings And the TPBL after winning back-to-back championships.

=== Fukushima Firebonds ===
On July 7, 2025, Manigault signed with the Fukushima Firebonds of the B2 League. At the end of the 2025–26 season, he became the B2 steals leader with an average of 2.5 steals.

== Personal life ==
Manigault is the cousin of Khris Middleton and the nephew of Earl Manigault, both basketball players. His wife Sarah is his personal physical therapist.
