= Kaleb Wesson =

American basketball player

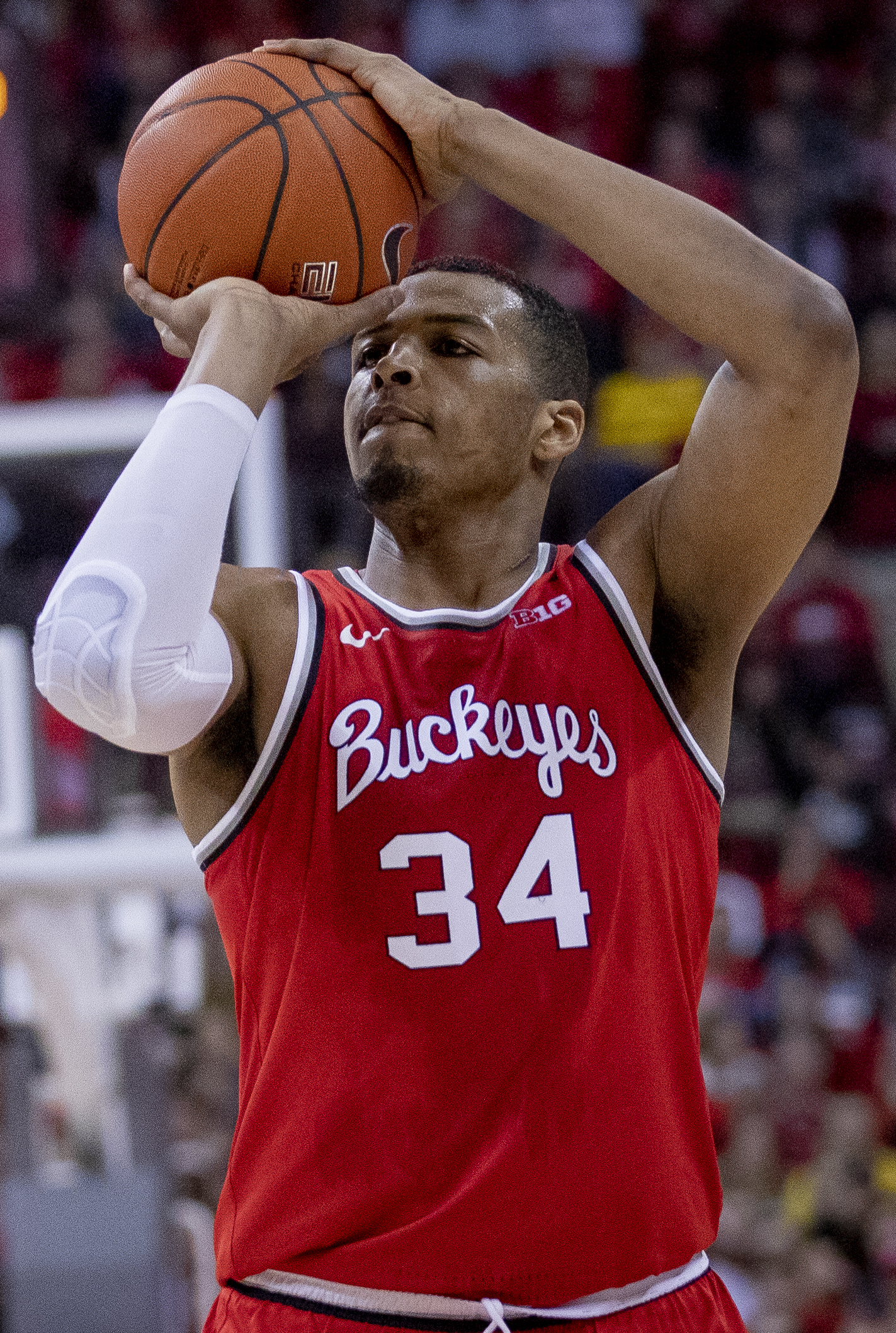
- Wesson with the Ohio State Buckeyes in 2020

No. 34 – Bogor Hornbills
- Position: Power forward / center
- League: IBL

Personal information
- Born: July 27, 1999 (age 27) Westerville, Ohio, U.S.
- Listed height: 6 ft 10 in (2.08 m)
- Listed weight: 250 lb (113 kg)

Career information
- High school: Westerville South (Westerville, Ohio)
- College: Ohio State (2017–2020)
- NBA draft: 2020: undrafted
- Playing career: 2021–present

Career history
- 2021: Santa Cruz Warriors
- 2021: Oostende
- 2021: Hapoel Gilboa Galil
- 2022: Maccabi Rishon LeZion
- 2022: Indios de Mayagüez
- 2022: Phoenix Super LPG Fuel Masters
- 2023: Indios de Mayagüez
- 2023–2024: CSKA Sofia
- 2024: Élan Chalon
- 2024–2025: Kaohsiung Aquas
- 2025–present: Bogor Hornbills

Career highlights
- IBL champion (2026); Second-team All-Big Ten (2020); Ohio Mr. Basketball (2017)
- Stats at NBA.com
- Stats at Basketball Reference

Kaleb Avery Wesson (born July 27, 1999) is an American professional basketball player for the Bogor Hornbills of the Indonesian Basketball League (IBL). He played college basketball for the Ohio State Buckeyes.

== High school career ==
Wesson is the son of Keith Wesson, who played at Ohio State from 1983 to 1987. Kaleb attended Westerville South High School and played alongside older brother Andre. Kaleb became a starter as a sophomore on the state runner-up team. He had seven points and four rebounds as the Wildcats beat Lima Senior High School 57–55 to claim the state title. Wesson scored a school-record 49 points in a 68–67 loss to Upper Arlington High School on January 24, 2017. As a senior, Wesson averaged 22.4 points and 10.9 rebounds per game and shot 67 percent from the floor on a team that finished 19–6. He was named Ohio Mr. Basketball.

=== Recruiting ===
Wesson was a four-star recruit, rated as the No. 75 overall player and No. 6 center in his class, and committed to Ohio State.

College recruiting
| Name | Hometown | School | Height | Weight | Commit date |
|---|---|---|---|---|---|
| Kaleb Wesson; C | Westerville, OH | Westerville (OH) | 6 ft 9 in (2.06 m) | 290 lb (130 kg) | Jul 3, 2015 |
| Kaleb Wesson; C | Recruit ratings: Rivals: 247Sports: ESPN: (85) | | | | |
Overall recruit ranking: Rivals: 87 247Sports: 97 ESPN: 72
Note: In many cases, Scout, Rivals, 247Sports, On3, and ESPN may conflict in their listings of height and weight.; In these cases, the average was taken. ESPN grades are on a 100-point scale.; Sources: "Ohio State 2017 Basketball Commitments". Rivals.; "2017 Ohio State Buckeyes Recruiting Class". ESPN.; "2017 Team Ranking". Rivals.

== College career ==
After arriving at Ohio State, Wesson worked to get in better shape, losing weight by cutting out soda and juice. He averaged 10.2 points and 4.9 rebounds per game on 56 percent shooting as a freshman. He was named to the Big Ten All-Freshman team. Wesson had a career-high 31 points in a 75–56 win against Youngstown State on December 18, 2018. On March 1, 2019, Wesson was suspended for violating athletic department policy. He missed three games and returned in time for a Big Ten Tournament matchup with Indiana, finishing with 17 points, 13 rebounds, three assists, three blocks and two steals in the 79–75 victory. Wesson was an All-Big Ten honorable mention selection. As a sophomore, Wesson averaged 14.6 points, 6.9 rebounds and 1.8 assists per game, shooting 50 percent from the floor and 34 percent from three-point range. After the season, he declared for the 2019 NBA draft but ultimately opted to return to Ohio State.

Wesson worked on his conditioning coming into his junior year by boxing with strength and conditioning coach Quadrian Banks. He was ranked the sixth-best player in college basketball by ESPN in October 2019. After scoring 10 points and grabbing 11 rebounds in a 76–51 victory over Villanova, Wesson was named Big Ten player of the week on November 18. He had 28 points and 10 rebounds in a 106–74 rout of Penn State, helping the Buckeyes notch 100 points against a Big Ten rival for the first time since 1991. At the close of the regular season, Wesson was named to the Second Team All-Big Ten by the coaches and media.

As a junior, Wesson averaged 14.0 points (10th in the Big Ten) and 9.3 rebounds (5th) per game, shooting 42.5% from beyond the arc, and was ninth in the Big Ten in free throw percentage, at 73.1%. Following the season, he declared for the 2020 NBA draft.

== Professional career ==
After going undrafted in the 2020 NBA draft, Wesson signed with the Golden State Warriors. On December 18, 2020, the Warriors released Wesson.

=== Santa Cruz Warriors (2021) ===
On January 12, 2021, Wesson was included in roster of Santa Cruz Warriors which would participate the 2020–21 season in the ESPN Wide World of Sports Complex of Walt Disney World Resort located near Orlando.

=== Overseas (2021–present) ===
On April 1, 2021, Wesson signed with Filou Oostende of the Belgian League.

On September 9, 2021, Wesson signed with Hapoel Gilboa Galil of the Israeli Basketball Premier League.

On January 1, 2022, Wesson signed with Maccabi Rishon LeZion of the Israeli Basketball Premier League.

In August 2022, he signed with the Phoenix Super LPG Fuel Masters of the Philippine Basketball Association (PBA) as the team's import for the 2022–23 PBA Commissioner's Cup.

On July 29, 2024, Wesson signed with the Kaohsiung Aquas of the Taiwan Professional Basketball League (TPBL). On July 29, 2025, Kaohsiung Aquas announced that Wesson left the team.

== Career statistics ==
Legend
| GP | Games played | GS | Games started | MPG | Minutes per game |
| FG% | Field goal percentage | 3P% | 3-point field goal percentage | FT% | Free throw percentage |
| RPG | Rebounds per game | APG | Assists per game | SPG | Steals per game |
| BPG | Blocks per game | PPG | Points per game | **Bold** | Career high |

=== College ===
| Year | Team | GP | GS | MPG | FG% | 3P% | FT% | RPG | APG | SPG | BPG | PPG |
|---|---|---|---|---|---|---|---|---|---|---|---|---|
| 2017–18 | Ohio State | **33** | 30 | 20.7 | **.562** | .286 | .721 | 4.9 | 1.1 | .5 | .6 | 10.2 |
| 2018–19 | Ohio State | 32 | **31** | 25.9 | .500 | .347 | **.734** | 6.9 | 1.8 | **1.0** | .7 | **14.6** |
| 2019–20 | Ohio State | 31 | **31** | **29.5** | .444 | **.425** | .731 | **9.3** | **1.9** | .7 | **1.0** | 14.0 |
| Career | | 96 | 92 | 25.3 | .495 | .385 | .729 | 7.0 | 1.6 | .8 | .8 | 12.9 |
