= Craig Sword =

American basketball player (born 1994)

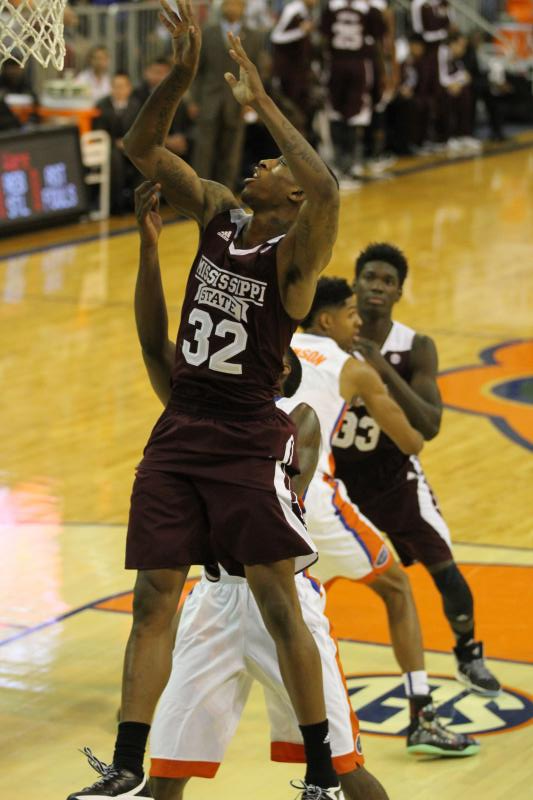
- Sword with the Mississippi State Bulldogs in 2015

No. 3 – New Taipei Kings
- Position: Shooting guard
- League: Taiwan Professional Basketball League

Personal information
- Born: January 16, 1994 (age 32) Montgomery, Alabama, U.S.
- Listed height: 6 ft 3 in (1.91 m)
- Listed weight: 196 lb (89 kg)

Career information
- High school: G. W. Carver (Montgomery, Alabama)
- College: Mississippi State (2012–2016)
- NBA draft: 2016: undrafted
- Playing career: 2016–present

Career history
- 2016–2017: Wilki Morskie Szczecin
- 2017–2019: Erie BayHawks
- 2019: Rayos de Hermosillo
- 2019–2020: Grand Rapids Drive
- 2020: Astros de Jalisco
- 2021: Omaha's Finest
- 2021–2023: Capital City Go-Go
- 2021–2022: Washington Wizards
- 2023: Spartans Distrito Capital
- 2023–2024: Indiana Mad Ants
- 2024: Tasmania JackJumpers
- 2025: Kaohsiung Aquas
- 2025: Hsinchu Toplus Lioneers
- 2026: Rayos de Hermosillo
- 2026–present: New Taipei Kings

Career highlights
- Second-team All-SEC (2015); SEC All-Freshman team (2013); Alabama Mr. Basketball (2012)
- Stats at NBA.com
- Stats at Basketball Reference
Medals
Men's basketball
Representing United States
FIBA AmeriCup
Bronze medal – third place	2022 Brazil

Craig Sword (born January 16, 1994) is an American professional basketball player for the New Taipei Kings of the Taiwan Professional Basketball League (TPBL). He played college basketball for the Mississippi State Bulldogs.

== High school career ==
Sword played high school basketball for George Washington Carver High School in Montgomery. His senior year, Sword led his team to the 6A state championship was named Alabama Mr. Basketball. Sword was listed as 4-star recruit by Rivals.com, and choose to attend Mississippi State over offers from Alabama, Auburn, and Georgia. While Sword committed to head coach Rick Stansbury, he kept his commitment to the Bulldogs when Stansbury was fired and replaced by Rick Ray.

== College career ==
As a true freshman in 2012–13, Sword appeared all 32 games for the Bulldogs, starting 30 of them. He was named SEC Freshman of the Week twice, and led the Bulldogs with 10.5 points per game. The Bulldogs finished a dismal 4–14 in the SEC, however.

Sword improved his scoring clip in 2013–14 to 13.7 PPG as a sophomore. Sword scored his career high, 33 points, in a 91–82 loss to LSU.

Sword was sidelined with a back injury in the first half of his junior year in 2014–15. However, he returned to full form during the conference portion of the season, again leading the Bulldogs in scoring, leading the Bulldogs to a 6–12 conference record, and a generally much more competitive team. Sword was named Second Team All-SEC for his efforts.

Sword places ninth on the Bulldogs' career leaderboard with 144 steals.

== Professional career ==
=== Wilki Morskie Szczecin (2016–2017) ===
After going undrafted in the 2016 NBA draft, Sword signed on June 25, 2016, with Wilki Morskie Szczecin of the Polish Basketball League, averaging 4.3 points, 1.9 rebounds, 1.1 assists and 11.7 minutes in 19 games.

=== Erie BayHawks (2017–2019) ===
On October 25, 2017, Sword signed with the Erie BayHawks of the NBA G League after a tryout.

On September 27, 2018, Sword re-signed with the Erie BayHawks. He joined the Grand Rapids Drive in 2019.

=== Omaha's Finest (2021) ===
In 2021, Sword signed with Omaha's Finest of The Basketball League.

=== Grand Rapids Gold (2021) ===
In October 2021, he joined the Grand Rapids Gold.

=== Capital City Go-Go / Washington Wizards (2021–2023) ===
On November 3, 2021, Sword was acquired by the Capital City Go-Go and on December 28, he signed a 10-day contract with the Washington Wizards. Sword played 3 games in the NBA, averaging 2.0 points in 6.3 minutes per game with the Wizards. On January 6, 2022, Sword was reacquired and activated by the Go-Go.

=== Spartans Distrito Capital (2023) ===
On April 3, 2023, Sword signed with Spartans Distrito Capital of the Venezuelan League.

=== Indiana Mad Ants (2023–2024) ===
On September 26, 2023, Sword signed with the Indiana Pacers, but was waived two days later. On October 28, 2023, he joined the Indiana Mad Ants.

=== Tasmania JackJumpers (2024) ===
On May 28, 2024, Sword signed with the Tasmania JackJumpers of the Australian National Basketball League (NBL) for the 2024–25 season. He was released by the JackJumpers on December 13, 2024, after averaging 6.3 points in 15 games.

=== Kaohsiung Aquas (2025) ===
On January 1, 2025, Sword signed with the Kaohsiung Aquas of the Taiwan Professional Basketball League (TPBL). On July 29, Kaohsiung Aquas announced that Sword left the team.

=== Hsinchu Toplus Lioneers (2025) ===
On October 23, 2025, Sword signed with the Hsinchu Toplus Lioneers of the Taiwan Professional Basketball League (TPBL). On December 26, the Hsinchu Toplus Lioneers terminated the contract relationship with Sword.

=== Rayos de Hermosillo (2026) ===
On April 6, 2026, Sword signed with the Rayos de Hermosillo of the Liga Mexicana de Básquetbol CIBACOPA.

=== New Taipei Kings (2026–present) ===
On July 15, 2026, Sword signed with the New Taipei Kings of the Taiwan Professional Basketball League (TPBL).

== Career statistics ==
Legend
GP	Games played	GS	Games started	MPG	Minutes per game
FG%	Field goal percentage	3P%	3-point field goal percentage	FT%	Free throw percentage
RPG	Rebounds per game	APG	Assists per game	SPG	Steals per game
BPG	Blocks per game	PPG	Points per game	**Bold**	Career high

=== NBA ===
Year	Team	GP	GS	MPG	FG%	3P%	FT%	RPG	APG	SPG	BPG	PPG
2021–22	Washington	3	0	6.3	.750	.000	.000	.0	.3	1.3	.0	2.0
Career		3	0	6.3	.750	.000	.000	.0	.3	1.3	.0	2.0

=== College ===
Year	Team	GP	GS	MPG	FG%	3P%	FT%	RPG	APG	SPG	BPG	PPG
2012–13	Mississippi State	**32**	30	26.7	.405	.194	.554	2.9	2.3	1.7	.4	10.5
2013–14	Mississippi State	**32**	**32**	28.1	**.485**	.273	.620	3.8	2.8	**1.9**	.5	**13.7**
2014–15	Mississippi State	28	22	24.8	.451	**.360**	**.701**	2.8	1.7	1.0	.4	11.3
2015–16	Mississippi State	31	31	**29.2**	.451	.232	.676	**3.9**	**3.0**	1.3	**.9**	13.0
Career		123	115	27.3	.449	.263	.635	3.3	2.5	1.5	.6	12.1
