= 2024–25 New Taipei Kings season =

Taiwanese professional basketball season

- TPBL champions
- President: Walter Wang
- General Manager: James Mao
- Head Coach: Ryan Marchand
- Arena: Xinzhuang Gymnasium; University of Taipei, Tian-Mu Campus Gymnasium

TPBL results
- Record: 26–10 (72.2%)
- Place: 1st
- Playoffs finish: Champions (1st title) (defeated Aquas, 4–3)

EASL results
- Record: 4–2 (66.7%)
- Place: 2nd
- Playoffs finish: Third place (defeated Golden Kings, 84–80)

BCL Asia

BCL Asia – East results
- Record: 4–2 (66.7%)
- Place: 2nd
- Playoffs finish: Third place (lost to Pelita Jaya, 74–103)

Player records
- Points: Jason Washburn 19.7
- Rebounds: Jason Washburn 10.7
- Assists: Jeremy Lin 5.6

The 2024–25 New Taipei Kings season was the franchise's fourth season, its first season in the Taiwan Professional Basketball League (TPBL).

The Kings were coached by Ryan Marchand in his fourth year as head coach.

The Kings also participated in 2024–25 East Asia Super League and 2025 Basketball Champions League Asia – East as the 2024 PLG champion.

== Draft ==
Round	Pick	Player	Position(s)	School / club team
1	7	Chen Chiang-Shuang	Guard	SHU

- Reference：

On August 29, 2024, the first rounder, Chen Chiang-Shuang had joined the Nanjing Monkey Kings of the Chinese Basketball Association.

== Roster ==
2024–25 New Taipei Kings roster
Players
Coaches

Pos.	No.	Nat.	Name	Ht.	Wt.	Age	From
F	0	(Nigeria)	Ifeanyi Eboka (BCL)	1.98 m (6 ft 6 in)	104 kg (229 lb)	25 – 29 June 2000	SHU
G	1	(United States) (Taiwan)	Joseph Lin (HP)	1.85 m (6 ft 1 in)	73 kg (161 lb)	33 – 21 June 1992	Hamilton
G	2	(Taiwan)	Su Pei-Kai	1.87 m (6 ft 2 in)	83 kg (183 lb)	25 – 2 November 1999	NTUA
F	3	(Taiwan)	Chen Chun-Nan	1.90 m (6 ft 3 in)	90 kg (198 lb)	25 – 20 April 2000	NTSU
C	5	(United States)	Chris Johnson (BCL)	2.11 m (6 ft 11 in)	105 kg (231 lb)	39 – 17 July 1985	LSU
G	7	(United States) (Taiwan)	Jeremy Lin (HP)	1.92 m (6 ft 4 in)	95 kg (209 lb)	36 – 23 August 1988	Harvard
G	8	(Nigeria) (United States)	Michael Efevberha (BCL)	1.98 m (6 ft 6 in)	88 kg (194 lb)	40 – 22 August 1984	Cal State Northridge
G	9	(Taiwan)	Lee Kai-Yan	1.82 m (6 ft 0 in)	80 kg (176 lb)	32 – 6 May 1993	HWU
G	10	(Taiwan)	Chien You-Che	1.80 m (5 ft 11 in)	80 kg (176 lb)	29 – 10 September 1995	UCH
C	11	(Taiwan)	Wang Po-Chih	1.95 m (6 ft 5 in)	130 kg (287 lb)	28 – 29 October 1996	NTSU
F	13	(Taiwan)	Lu Cheng-Ju	1.94 m (6 ft 4 in)	93 kg (205 lb)	39 – 13 April 1986	TPEC
F	17	(Taiwan)	Su Shih-Hsuan	1.97 m (6 ft 6 in)	95 kg (209 lb)	29 – 9 April 1996	NTNU
F	19	(Taiwan)	Lin Chin-Pang (C)	1.90 m (6 ft 3 in)	90 kg (198 lb)	40 – 15 June 1985	MU
G	24	(Taiwan)	Hung Chih-Shan	1.76 m (5 ft 9 in)	75 kg (165 lb)	39 – 5 July 1985	NTUT
F	25	(United States)	Austin Daye (I)	2.07 m (6 ft 9 in)	91 kg (201 lb)	37 – 5 June 1988	Gonzaga
F	31	(Palestine)	Sani Sakakini (AI)	2.04 m (6 ft 8 in)	102 kg (225 lb)	36 – 19 August 1988	JUST
C	42	(United States) (Bulgaria)	Jason Washburn (I)	2.13 m (7 ft 0 in)	111 kg (245 lb)	35 – 5 June 1990	Utah
F	55	(United States)	Kenny Manigault (I)	1.96 m (6 ft 5 in)	95 kg (209 lb)	34 – 22 May 1991	Pikeville
G	72	(Taiwan)	Lin Li-Jen	1.83 m (6 ft 0 in)	85 kg (187 lb)	35 – 16 June 1990	MDU

Head coach

- (United States) Ryan Marchand

Assistant coach(es)

- (Australia) (United States) Thomas Wisman
- (Taiwan) Lin Cheng-Yu
- (United States) Mark Coppola

Strength & conditioning coach(es)

- (Taiwan) Chang Chung-Hsi
- (Taiwan) Liu Cheng-Yu

Athletic trainer(s)

- (Taiwan) Chiu Po-Kai
- (Taiwan) Wu Chung-Hao

Team manager

- (Taiwan) James Mao

Legend

- (C) Team captain
- (I) Import player
- (HP) Heritage player
- (AI) Asian import player
- (BCL) BCL Asia player
- Injured

- Roster
Updated: June 16, 2025

== Macau WUS International Basketball Club Challenge ==
Recap

July 31, 2024
20:30 (UTC+8)

New Taipei Kings	87–91	Barangay Ginebra San Miguel

Tap Seac Multi-sports Pavilion, São Lázaro

== Preseason ==
=== Game log ===
2024 preseason game log
Total: 0–2 (home: 0–1; road: 0–1)
Preseason : 0–2 (home: 0–1; road: 0–1)

Game	Date	Team	Score	High points	High rebounds	High assists	Location Attendance	Record
1	October 6	@ Dreamers	L 81–99	Chris Johnson (21)	Chris Johnson (13)	Su Shih-Hsuan (5); Joseph Lin (5)	Taichung Intercontinental Basketball Stadium; 2,807	0–1
2	October 13	DEA	L 77–85	Lee Kai-Yan (17)	Chris Johnson (13)	Lee Kai-Yan (4)	Hsinchu County Stadium; 3,668	0–2

Color： Win Lose
Schedule

== Regular season ==
=== Standings ===
Pos	Team	Pld	W	L	PCT	GB	Qualification
1	New Taipei Kings	36	26	10	.722	—	Advance to semifinals
2	Formosa Dreamers	36	21	15	.583	5	Advance to semifinals
3	Kaohsiung Aquas	36	19	17	.528	7	Advance to semifinals
4	Taipei Taishin Mars	36	16	20	.444	10	Advance to play-in
5	Taoyuan Taiwan Beer Leopards	36	16	20	.444	10	Advance to play-in
6	New Taipei CTBC DEA	36	16	20	.444	10	
7	Hsinchu Toplus Lioneers	36	12	24	.333	14	

Source: TPBL

With a victory against the New Taipei CTBC DEA on May 3, 2025, the Kings clinched the league's best record for the 2024–25 season.

=== Game log ===
2024–25 regular season game log
Total: 26–10 (home: 15–3; road: 11–7)
October : 3–1 (home: 2–1; road: 1–0)

Game	Date	Team	Score	High points	High rebounds	High assists	Location Attendance	Record
1	October 19	@ Aquas	W 88–78	Jeremy Lin (34)	Jason Washburn (9); Kenny Manigault (9)	Jeremy Lin (4)	Kaohsiung Arena; 8,156	1–0
2	October 26	Lioneers	W 122–93	Joseph Lin (24)	Austin Daye (8)	Jeremy Lin (9)	Xinzhuang Gymnasium; 3,581	2–0
3	October 27	DEA	L 98–99	Chris Johnson (20)	Chris Johnson (18)	Joseph Lin (8)	Xinzhuang Gymnasium; 3,568	2–1
4	October 30	Dreamers	W 88–81	Jeremy Lin (26)	Kenny Manigault (14)	Joseph Lin (7)	Xinzhuang Gymnasium; 3,261	3–1

November : 1–1 (home: 0–0; road: 1–1)

Game	Date	Team	Score	High points	High rebounds	High assists	Location Attendance	Record
5	November 10	@ Dreamers	L 76–87	Joseph Lin (21)	Jeremy Lin (11); Kenny Manigault (11)	Jeremy Lin (7)	Taichung Intercontinental Basketball Stadium; 3,000	3–2
6	November 27	@ DEA	W 79–61	Jason Washburn (25)	Jason Washburn (19)	Jeremy Lin (7)	Xinzhuang Gymnasium; 3,756	4–2

December : 5–1 (home: 3–1; road: 2–0)

Game	Date	Team	Score	High points	High rebounds	High assists	Location Attendance	Record
7	December 7	Lioneers	W 96–78	Jason Washburn (17)	Chris Johnson (14)	Jeremy Lin (8)	Xinzhuang Gymnasium; 4,349	5–2
8	December 8	Dreamers	W 121–89	Jason Washburn (24)	Austin Daye (8); Kenny Manigault (8)	Jeremy Lin (8)	Xinzhuang Gymnasium; 5,255	6–2
9	December 15	@ Aquas	W 107–78	Chris Johnson (22)	Chris Johnson (11)	Lee Kai-Yan (5)	Kaohsiung Arena; 9,223	7–2
10	December 21	@ Mars	W 102–89	Chris Johnson (27)	Kenny Manigault (9)	Jeremy Lin (9)	Taipei Heping Basketball Gymnasium; 4,668	8–2
11	December 28	Aquas	W 111–108 (2OT)	Jason Washburn (24)	Jason Washburn (16)	Joseph Lin (7)	Xinzhuang Gymnasium; 5,659	9–2
12	December 29	Dreamers	L 95–101	Jason Washburn (26)	Jason Washburn (12)	Kenny Manigault (9)	Xinzhuang Gymnasium; 5,812	9–3

January : 3–1 (home: 1–0; road: 2–1)

Game	Date	Team	Score	High points	High rebounds	High assists	Location Attendance	Record
13	January 1	DEA	W 96–79	Jason Washburn (25)	Jason Washburn (12)	Lee Kai-Yan (6)	Xinzhuang Gymnasium; 5,326	10–3
14	January 4	@ Lioneers	W 98–89	Sani Sakakini (27)	Kenny Manigault (12)	Joseph Lin (7)	Hsinchu County Stadium; 5,077	11–3
15	January 11	@ Dreamers	L 79–112	Jason Washburn (16)	Kenny Manigault (16)	Jeremy Lin (7)	Taichung Intercontinental Basketball Stadium; 3,000	11–4
16	January 19	@ Lioneers	W 114–106	Sani Sakakini (34)	Sani Sakakini (11)	Jeremy Lin (8); Kenny Manigault (8)	Hsinchu County Stadium; 4,953	12–4

February : 1–1 (home: 0–0; road: 1–1)

Game	Date	Team	Score	High points	High rebounds	High assists	Location Attendance	Record
17	February 8	@ Leopards	L 84–100	Chris Johnson (18); Kenny Manigault (18)	Kenny Manigault (13)	Joseph Lin (8)	Taoyuan Arena; 6,869	12–5
18	February 26	@ Leopards	W 102–99	Joseph Lin (22); Jason Washburn (22)	Jason Washburn (12)	Joseph Lin (8); Kenny Manigault (8)	Taoyuan Arena; 3,989	13–5

March : 4–1 (home: 2–0; road: 2–1)

Game	Date	Team	Score	High points	High rebounds	High assists	Location Attendance	Record
19	March 1	@ Mars	L 100–106	Kenny Manigault (33)	Kenny Manigault (14)	Joseph Lin (6)	Taipei Heping Basketball Gymnasium; 4,798	13–6
20	March 15	@ Lioneers	W 114–111	Jason Washburn (42)	Jason Washburn (13)	Kenny Manigault (6)	Hsinchu County Stadium; 5,411	14–6
—	March 19	Aquas	Rescheduled to April 2					
21	March 22	Mars	W 114–87	Jason Washburn (26)	Jason Washburn (15)	Kenny Manigault (10)	Xinzhuang Gymnasium; 3,804	15–6
22	March 23	Leopards	W 108–97	Jeremy Lin (36)	Jason Washburn (18)	Jeremy Lin (7)	Xinzhuang Gymnasium; 3,823	16–6
23	March 30	@ DEA	W 100–98	Jeremy Lin (20)	Jason Washburn (17)	Jeremy Lin (6)	Xinzhuang Gymnasium; 6,068	17–6

April : 6–3 (home: 4–1; road: 2–2)

Game	Date	Team	Score	High points	High rebounds	High assists	Location Attendance	Record
24	April 2	Aquas	W 111–91	Austin Daye (32)	Austin Daye (8)	Kenny Manigault (11)	Xinzhuang Gymnasium; 3,066	18–6
25	April 5	Aquas	W 106–92	Jeremy Lin (29)	Jason Washburn (10)	Jeremy Lin (6)	Xinzhuang Gymnasium; 4,295	19–6
26	April 6	Mars	W 112–96	Jason Washburn (26)	Jason Washburn (12)	Kenny Manigault (10)	Xinzhuang Gymnasium; 3,866	20–6
27	April 12	Lioneers	W 111–100	Jason Washburn (26)	Kenny Manigault (13)	Kenny Manigault (9)	Xinzhuang Gymnasium; 4,774	21–6
28	April 13	Leopards	L 68–87	Kenny Manigault (19)	Kenny Manigault (16)	Jeremy Lin (6)	Xinzhuang Gymnasium; 4,537	21–7
29	April 16	@ Mars	L 83–107	Jeremy Lin (17)	Kenny Manigault (12)	Jeremy Lin (5)	Taipei Heping Basketball Gymnasium; 4,555	21–8
30	April 20	@ DEA	W 111–79	Sani Sakakini (28)	Sani Sakakini (14)	Jeremy Lin (8)	Xinzhuang Gymnasium; 6,043	22–8
31	April 23	@ Leopards	W 114–109	Kenny Manigault (32)	Kenny Manigault (14)	Joseph Lin (8)	Taoyuan Arena; 4,205	23–8
32	April 26	@ Aquas	L 83–97	Kenny Manigault (26)	Sani Sakakini (9)	Joseph Lin (6)	Kaohsiung Arena; 7,386	23–9

May : 3–1 (home: 3–0; road: 0–1)

Game	Date	Team	Score	High points	High rebounds	High assists	Location Attendance	Record
—	May 3	Mars	Rescheduled to May 9					
33	May 3	DEA	W 121–76	Sani Sakakini (32)	Kenny Manigault (17)	Joseph Lin (8)	Xinzhuang Gymnasium; 5,038	24–9
—	May 4	DEA	Rescheduled to May 3					
—	May 7	Leopards	Rescheduled to May 8					
34	May 8	Leopards	W 117–84	Jeremy Lin (25)	Jason Washburn (14)	Joseph Lin (9)	Xinzhuang Gymnasium; 3,073	25–9
35	May 9	Mars	W 102–97	Jason Washburn (20)	Kenny Manigault (11)	Kenny Manigault (7)	Xinzhuang Gymnasium; 3,423	26–9
36	May 17	@ Dreamers	L 78–115	Lin Li-Jen (16)	Jason Washburn (7); Wang Po-Chih (7); Su Shih-Hsuan (7)	Lee Kai-Yan (3); Joseph Lin (3); Su Pei-Kai (3)	Taichung Intercontinental Basketball Stadium; 3,000	26–10

Color： Win Lose Rescheduled
Schedule

=== Regular season note ===
- Due to the 2025 FIBA Asia Cup qualification, the TPBL declared that the game on March 19 would be rescheduled to April 2.
- Due to the 2025 Basketball Champions League Asia – East, the TPBL declared that the games on May 3, 4, and 7 would be rescheduled to May 9, 3, and 8.

== Playoffs ==
=== Game log ===
2025 playoffs game log
Total: 8–3 (home: 5–1; road: 3–2)
Semifinals : 4–0 (home: 2–0; road: 2–0)

Game	Date	Team	Score	High points	High rebounds	High assists	Location Attendance	Series
1	May 30	Mars	W 111–88	Jeremy Lin (23)	Sani Sakakini (14)	Joseph Lin (5); Kenny Manigault (5)	Xinzhuang Gymnasium; 5,802	1–0
2	June 1	Mars	W 109–83	Jason Washburn (26)	Sani Sakakini (13)	Joseph Lin (15)	Xinzhuang Gymnasium; 6,248	2–0
3	June 5	@ Mars	W 113–104	Kenny Manigault (24)	Sani Sakakini (8); Kenny Manigault (8)	Joseph Lin (6); Jeremy Lin (6)	Taipei Heping Basketball Gymnasium; 3,380	3–0
4	June 7	@ Mars	W 101–93	Lee Kai-Yan (22)	Sani Sakakini (13)	Kenny Manigault (6)	Taipei Heping Basketball Gymnasium; 5,200	4–0

Finals : 4–3 (home: 3–1; road: 1–2)

Game	Date	Team	Score	High points	High rebounds	High assists	Location Attendance	Series
1	June 16	Aquas	W 100–89	Kenny Manigault (22); Jason Washburn (22)	Kenny Manigault (21)	Kenny Manigault (6)	Xinzhuang Gymnasium; 6,800	1–0
2	June 18	Aquas	L 91–99	Jeremy Lin (21)	Kenny Manigault (9)	Kenny Manigault (8)	Xinzhuang Gymnasium; 6,800	1–1
3	June 21	@ Aquas	W 104–99	Jeremy Lin (26)	Sani Sakakini (9)	Jeremy Lin (9)	Kaohsiung Arena; 12,000	2–1
4	June 23	@ Aquas	L 99–117	Jason Washburn (20)	Sani Sakakini (10)	Jeremy Lin (10)	Kaohsiung Arena; 10,142	2–2
5	June 25	Aquas	W 93–83	Jeremy Lin (29)	Austin Daye (11)	Lee Kai-Yan (6)	Xinzhuang Gymnasium; 6,800	3–2
6	June 27	@ Aquas	L 109–112 (OT)	Jeremy Lin (26)	Kenny Manigault (9)	Jeremy Lin (8)	Kaohsiung Arena; 12,000	3–3
7	June 29	Aquas	W 108–89	Jeremy Lin (27)	Austin Daye (14); Jason Washburn (14)	Joseph Lin (4); Jeremy Lin (4); Hung Chih-Shan (4)	Xinzhuang Gymnasium; 6,800	4–3

Color： Win Lose
Schedule

== East Asia Super League ==
=== Standings ===
Pos	Team	Pld	W	L	PF	PA	PD	PCT	Qualification
1	(Japan) Ryukyu Golden Kings	6	5	1	498	493	+5	.833	Advance to semifinals
2	(Chinese Taipei) New Taipei Kings	6	4	2	594	532	+62	.667	Advance to semifinals
3	Macau Black Bears	6	3	3	582	579	+3	.500	
4	(Philippines) Meralco Bolts	6	2	4	487	509	−22	.333	
5	(South Korea) Busan KCC Egis	6	1	5	496	544	−48	.167	

Source: EASL

=== Group stage ===
October 23, 2024	New Taipei Kings (Chinese Taipei)	97–109	Macau Black Bears	New Taipei City
19:10 (UTC+8)	Scoring by quarter: 23–34, 26–21, 26–25, 22–29
	Pts: Kenny Manigault 25; Rebs: Kenny Manigault 11; Asts: Kenny Manigault 7	Boxscore	Pts: Jeantal Cylla 32; Rebs: Will Artino 11; Asts: Damian Chong Qui 11	Arena: Xinzhuang Gymnasium

December 11, 2024	Macau Black Bears	95–114	(Chinese Taipei) New Taipei Kings	Macau
21:10 (UTC+8)	Scoring by quarter: 17–33, 29–28, 17–35, 32–18
	Pts: Damian Chong Qui 32; Rebs: Samuel Deguara 15; Asts: Damian Chong Qui 11	Boxscore	Pts: Jeremy Lin 27; Rebs: Jeremy Lin 7 Asts: Jeremy Lin 6	Arena: Studio City Event Center

December 25, 2024	Ryukyu Golden Kings (Japan)	82–74	(Chinese Taipei) New Taipei Kings	Okinawa City
19:40 (UTC+9)	Scoring by quarter: 25–21, 21–17, 14–19, 22–17
	Pts: Keve Aluma 21; Rebs: Jack Cooley 14; Asts: Masahiro Waki 4	Boxscore	Pts: Kenny Manigault 19; Rebs: Sani Sakakini 10; Asts: Jeremy Lin 4	Arena: Okinawa Arena; Attendance: 7,508

January 8, 2025	New Taipei Kings (Chinese Taipei)	99–63	(Japan) Ryukyu Golden Kings	New Taipei City
19:10 (UTC+8)	Scoring by quarter: 19–12, 20–10, 31–10, 29–31
	Pts: Jeremy Lin 26; Rebs: Kenny Manigault 11; Asts: Jeremy Lin 7	Boxscore	Pts: Jack Cooley 13; Rebs: Jack Cooley 10; Asts: Vic Law 4	Arena: Xinzhuang Gymnasium

January 21, 2025	Busan KCC Egis (South Korea)	87–104	(Chinese Taipei) New Taipei Kings	Busan
19:10 (UTC+9)	Scoring by quarter: 21–28, 23–30, 23–24, 20–22
	Pts: Cady Lalanne 31; Rebs: Cady Lalanne 13; Asts: Lee Seoung-hyun, Lee Joo-young 4	Boxscore	Pts: Lee Kai-Yan 19; Rebs: Kenny Manigault 10; Asts: Kenny Manigault 10	Arena: Busan Sajik Gymnasium; Attendance: 1,448

February 12, 2025	New Taipei Kings (Chinese Taipei)	106–96(2OT)	(Philippines) Meralco Bolts	Taipei City
19:10 (UTC+8)	Scoring by quarter: 24–25, 18–19, 15–23, 21–11, Overtime: 28–18
	Pts: Sani Sakakini 31; Rebs: Kenny Manigault 14; Asts: Joseph Lin 7	Boxscore	Pts: D. J. Kennedy 21; Rebs: Akil Mitchell 9 Asts: Akil Mitchell 8	Arena: University of Taipei, Tian-Mu Campus Gymnasium

=== Final four ===
==== Semifinals ====
March 7, 2025	Hiroshima Dragonflies (Japan)	81–65	(Chinese Taipei) New Taipei Kings	Macau
18:40 (UTC+8)	Scoring by quarter: 15–19, 25–22, 28–19, 13–5
	Pts: Dwayne Evans 20; Rebs: Dwayne Evans 16; Asts: three players 3	Boxscore	Pts: Joseph Lin 17; Rebs: Austin Daye 10; Asts: Joseph Lin, Lee Kai-Yan 4	Arena: Studio City Event Center; Attendance: 1,721

==== Third place game ====
March 9, 2025	New Taipei Kings (Chinese Taipei)	84–80	(Japan) Ryukyu Golden Kings	Macau
16:10 (UTC+8)	Scoring by quarter: 20–19, 19–22, 18–20, 27–19
	Pts: Jeremy Lin 18; Rebs: Kenny Manigault 9 Asts: Joseph Lin 5	Boxscore	Pts: Alex Kirk 27; Rebs: Keve Aluma 14; Asts: Ryuichi Kishimoto, Hayate Arakawa 5	Arena: Studio City Event Center

== Basketball Champions League Asia ==
=== BCL Asia – East ===
==== Standings ====
Pos	Team	Pld	W	L	PF	PA	PD	Pts	Qualification
1	(Mongolia) Ulaanbaatar Xac Broncos	6	6	0	489	383	+106	12	Advance to Final Four
2	(Chinese Taipei) New Taipei Kings	6	4	2	503	466	+37	10	Advance to Final Four
3	(Thailand) Hi-Tech	6	2	4	516	474	+42	8	
4	(Singapore) Adroit Club	6	0	6	378	563	−185	6	

Source: FIBA

==== Group stage ====
April 27, 2025	New Taipei Kings (Chinese Taipei)	89–80	(Thailand) Hi-Tech	New Taipei City
17:00 (UTC+8)	Scoring by quarter: 22–23, 32–16, 18–20, 17–21
	Pts: Jason Washburn 24; Rebs: Jason Washburn 11; Asts: Michael Efevberha, Hung Chih-Shan 4	Boxscore	Pts: Mike Singletary 27; Rebs: Ryan Watkins 13; Asts: Attapong Leelaphipatkul 7	Arena: Xinzhuang Gymnasium; Attendance: 2,101; Referees: Issam Al-Siyabi (OMA), Lee Kyoung-Hwan (KOR), Imran Ali Baig (IND)

April 29, 2025	New Taipei Kings (Chinese Taipei)	105–65	(Singapore) Adroit	New Taipei City
20:00 (UTC+8)	Scoring by quarter: 28–19, 21–17, 25–10, 31–19
	Pts: Su Pei-Kai 21; Rebs: Sani Sakakini 10; Asts: three players 4	Boxscore	Pts: Leon Kwek 18; Rebs: Sergii Pryimak 10; Asts: Lin Jay Shay 4	Arena: Xinzhuang Gymnasium; Attendance: 1,250; Referees: Mohamed Hasan Alsalam (BRN), Imran Ali Baig (IND), Cheon Kam-Jae (KOR)

April 30, 2025	New Taipei Kings (Chinese Taipei)	68–81	(Mongolia) Ulaanbaatar Xac Broncos	New Taipei City
20:00 (UTC+8)	Scoring by quarter: 21–17, 15–15, 18–19, 14–30
	Pts: Michael Efevberha 19; Rebs: Chris Johnson, Michael Efevberha 6 Asts: Hung Chih-Shan 8	Boxscore	Pts: Jordy Tshimanga 29; Rebs: Sandagdorj Binderiya, Jordan Tolbert 10; Asts: Baatar-Erdene Barsbold 4	Arena: Xinzhuang Gymnasium; Attendance: 1,165; Referees: Lee Kyoung-Hwan (KOR), Mohamed Hasan Alsalam (BRN), Imran Ali Baig (IND)

May 5, 2025	Adroit (Singapore)	64–80	(Chinese Taipei) New Taipei Kings	Bangkok
19:00 (UTC+7)	Scoring by quarter: 28–24, 9–18, 13–14, 14–24
	Pts: Wong Zhong Han 17; Rebs: Oleksandr Kolchenko, Wong Zhong Han 6 Asts: Wong Zhong Han 5	Boxscore	Pts: Chris Johnson 25; Rebs: Chris Johnson 7 Asts: Hung Chih-Shan 6	Arena: Nimibutr Stadium; Attendance: 68; Referees: Bandar Al-Suwaidi (QAT), Khaled Al-Shammari (KUW), Haruga Iwai (JPN)

May 6, 2025	Hi-Tech (Thailand)	82–88	(Chinese Taipei) New Taipei Kings	Bangkok
19:00 (UTC+7)	Scoring by quarter: 27–22, 26–24, 12–21, 17–21
	Pts: Freddie Lish 25; Rebs: Mike Singletary 11; Asts: Mike Singletary 5	Boxscore	Pts: Michael Efevberha 39; Rebs: Chris Johnson 13; Asts: Lee Kai-Yan, Su Shih-Hsuan 3	Arena: Nimibutr Stadium; Attendance: 729; Referees: Alexey Stepanenko (KAZ), Haruga Iwai (JPN), Khaled Al-Shammari (KUW)

May 12, 2025	Ulaanbaatar Xac Broncos (Mongolia)	94–73	(Chinese Taipei) New Taipei Kings	Ulaanbaatar
17:30 (UTC+8)	Scoring by quarter: 25–23, 26–20, 20–20, 23–10
	Pts: Ian Miller 23; Rebs: Jordan Tolbert 9 Asts: Ian Miller 6	Boxscore	Pts: Michael Efevberha 31; Rebs: Michael Efevberha 12; Asts: Hung Chih-Shan 6	Arena: M bank Arena; Attendance: 1,552; Referees: Glenn Cornelio (PHI), Lee Kyoung-Hwan (KOR), Anton Kozlov (KAZ)

==== Final four ====
===== Semifinals =====
May 30, 2025	Taoyuan Pauian Pilots (Chinese Taipei)	81–62	(Chinese Taipei) New Taipei Kings	Ulaanbaatar
18:00 (UTC+8)	Scoring by quarter: 25–16, 19–18, 17–21, 20–7
	Pts: Jarrod Jones 23; Rebs: Jarrod Jones 12; Asts: Pai Yao-Cheng 7	Boxscore	Pts: Michael Efevberha 26; Rebs: Chris Johnson 20; Asts: Chris Johnson 5	Arena: M bank Arena; Attendance: 300; Referees: Yevgeniy Mikheyev (KAZ), Lee Kyoung-Hwan (KOR), Cheon Kam-Jae (KOR)

===== Third place game =====
May 31, 2025	New Taipei Kings (Chinese Taipei)	74–103	(Indonesia) Pelita Jaya	Ulaanbaatar
18:00 (UTC+8)	Scoring by quarter: 23–29, 21–26, 16–29, 14–19
	Pts: Chris Johnson 26; Rebs: Chris Johnson 14; Asts: Su Pei-Kai 6	Boxscore	Pts: Chris McCullough 31; Rebs: Jeff Withey 15; Asts: Muhamad Arighi 7	Arena: M bank Arena; Attendance: 575; Referees: Park Kyoung-Jin (KOR), Alexey Stepanenko (KAZ), Cheon Kam-Jae (KOR)

== Player statistics ==
Legend
GP	Games played	MPG	Minutes per game	FG%	Field goal percentage
3P%	3-point field goal percentage	FT%	Free throw percentage	RPG	Rebounds per game
APG	Assists per game	SPG	Steals per game	BPG	Blocks per game
PPG	Points per game		Led the league		Finals MVP

=== Regular season ===
Player	GP	MPG	PPG	FG%	3P%	FT%	RPG	APG	SPG	BPG
Joseph Lin	30	33:07	12.1	42.1%	30.8%	57.1%	3.9	5.6	1.6	0.5
Su Pei-Kai	23	6:40	1.2	21.8%	9.7%	0.0%	0.3	0.5	0.3	0.0
Chen Chun-Nan	32	13:49	2.4	28.3%	20.0%	60.0%	1.3	0.9	0.4	0.0
Chris Johnson	14	27:54	14.3	43.4%	27.0%	76.5%	9.9	2.0	0.7	1.4
Jeremy Lin	30	32:53	19.2	43.4%	35.9%	71.9%	5.7	5.6	1.6	0.5
Lee Kai-Yan	23	25:06	8.6	40.3%	25.0%	62.8%	3.5	2.1	1.1	0.0
Chien You-Che	33	20:50	4.7	40.3%	35.4%	66.7%	2.2	1.0	0.7	0.0
Wang Po-Chih	25	8:06	2.6	52.9%	25.0%	42.9%	2.4	0.2	0.2	0.0
Lu Cheng-Ju	20	13:33	3.8	31.3%	29.2%	50.0%	1.1	0.6	0.1	0.1
Su Shih-Hsuan	33	18:11	4.1	40.4%	24.6%	33.3%	3.5	0.8	0.3	0.4
Lin Chin-Pang	23	11:17	1.7	40.5%	18.8%	33.3%	1.5	0.7	0.4	0.0
Hung Chih-Shan	20	12:00	2.8	37.5%	40.0%	50.0%	1.1	1.3	0.3	0.1
Austin Daye	15	26:04	14.5	47.5%	44.3%	83.3%	6.9	2.7	0.8	0.6
Sani Sakakini	16	28:18	18.2	48.9%	36.8%	77.5%	8.8	2.0	1.1	0.3
Jason Washburn	31	32:17	19.7	56.4%	23.1%	73.3%	10.7	1.2	0.8	1.1
Kenny Manigault	30	31:43	16.5	44.2%	35.0%	70.1%	9.6	5.5	2.6	0.6
Lin Li-Jen	15	5:45	1.9	31.3%	30.8%	0.0%	0.8	0.0	0.1	0.0

=== Semifinals ===
Player	GP	MPG	PPG	FG%	3P%	FT%	RPG	APG	SPG	BPG
Joseph Lin	4	35:07	11.5	35.3%	23.8%	62.5%	3.0	7.8	2.8	0.3
Su Pei-Kai	Did not play									
Chen Chun-Nan	Did not play									
Jeremy Lin	3	29:11	17.7	39.0%	23.8%	69.6%	5.7	3.7	0.7	0.0
Lee Kai-Yan	4	32:40	14.3	42.2%	38.5%	75.0%	4.5	2.3	1.8	0.5
Chien You-Che	4	17:57	6.3	52.6%	41.7%	0.0%	3.8	0.8	0.8	0.0
Wang Po-Chih	1	4:50	5.0	100.0%	100.0%	0.0%	1.0	0.0	0.0	0.0
Lu Cheng-Ju	4	14:18	4.5	37.5%	42.9%	0.0%	3.0	0.8	0.3	0.3
Su Shih-Hsuan	4	19:14	3.8	38.5%	36.4%	50.0%	5.3	1.0	0.0	1.0
Lin Chin-Pang	2	1:06	0.0	0.0%	0.0%	0.0%	0.0	0.0	0.0	0.0
Hung Chih-Shan	2	6:53	1.0	0.0%	0.0%	100.0%	0.0	1.5	0.0	0.0
Austin Daye	Did not play									
Sani Sakakini	4	33:27	18.8	47.2%	41.7%	83.3%	12.0	1.8	0.5	0.5
Jason Washburn	4	28:35	15.0	53.5%	25.0%	72.2%	8.5	2.5	0.8	0.5
Kenny Manigault	4	30:37	19.5	51.7%	42.1%	76.9%	7.3	4.3	3.0	0.5
Lin Li-Jen	1	3:45	0.0	0.0%	0.0%	0.0%	1.0	1.0	0.0	0.0

=== Finals ===
Player	GP	MPG	PPG	FG%	3P%	FT%	RPG	APG	SPG	BPG
Joseph Lin	7	35:47	10.3	46.9%	28.0%	55.6%	2.7	3.6	1.6	0.0
Su Pei-Kai	Did not play									
Chen Chun-Nan	Did not play									
Jeremy Lin	7	37:05	22.4	38.1%	34.9%	83.3%	5.4	6.0	1.9	0.9
Lee Kai-Yan	7	31:19	8.1	40.8%	41.4%	62.5%	2.7	2.3	0.9	0.1
Chien You-Che	7	10:05	2.4	29.4%	23.1%	100.0%	0.9	0.3	0.4	0.0
Wang Po-Chih	2	3:59	0.0	0.0%	0.0%	0.0%	0.5	0.5	0.0	0.0
Lu Cheng-Ju	5	2:30	2.2	60.0%	60.0%	66.7%	0.4	0.2	0.2	0.0
Su Shih-Hsuan	7	18:16	4.9	52.0%	18.2%	60.0%	3.1	1.3	0.4	0.7
Lin Chin-Pang	6	3:46	1.0	66.7%	100.0%	33.3%	1.0	0.5	0.0	0.0
Hung Chih-Shan	6	12:08	1.5	27.3%	27.3%	0.0%	0.7	1.5	0.0	0.0
Austin Daye	5	30:38	15.8	50.0%	47.1%	77.8%	9.4	1.4	1.8	0.8
Sani Sakakini	4	30:50	14.5	42.9%	22.2%	90.9%	8.8	1.5	1.3	0.3
Jason Washburn	5	31:57	19.0	64.9%	25.0%	69.0%	7.6	0.8	0.4	1.0
Kenny Manigault	7	32:05	15.6	44.7%	40.0%	65.8%	9.4	3.6	2.3	0.4
Lin Li-Jen	Did not play									

- Reference：

== Transactions ==
On April 3, 2025, Chris Johnson was not registered in the 2024–25 TPBL season final rosters. But Johnson would play for 2025 Basketball Champions League Asia – East.

=== Overview ===
Players added

Via free agency

- Ifeanyi Eboka
- Michael Efevberha
- Chris Johnson
- Lu Cheng-Ju
- Sani Sakakini
- Jason Washburn
Players lost

Via free agency

- Chai Chen-Hao
- Quincy Davis
- Michael Efevberha
- Chris Johnson
- Wendell Lewis
- Li Wei-Ting
- Tony Mitchell
- Yang Chin-Min

=== Free agency ===
==== Re-signed ====
Date	Player	Contract terms	Ref.
July 2, 2024	Su Shih-Hsuan	—N/a	
July 18, 2024	Lee Kai-Yan	3-year contract, worth unknown	
July 29, 2024	Austin Daye	—N/a	
August 5, 2024	Kenny Manigault	—N/a	
September 2, 2024	Jeremy Lin	Extension contract with 1-year player option, worth unknown	

==== Additions ====
Date	Player	Contract terms	Former team	Ref.
July 15, 2024	Lu Cheng-Ju	—N/a	(Taiwan) Kaohsiung 17LIVE Steelers	
July 24, 2024	Chris Johnson	—N/a	(Taiwan) Taipei Fubon Braves	
August 1, 2024	Jason Washburn	—N/a	(Taiwan) Taoyuan Pauian Pilots	
October 9, 2024	Sani Sakakini	—N/a	(Lebanon) Al Riyadi Club Beirut	
February 7, 2025	Michael Efevberha	BCL Asia player contract, worth unknown	(Taiwan) Hsinchu Toplus Lioneers	
May 28, 2025	Ifeanyi Eboka	BCL Asia player contract, worth unknown	(Taiwan) Yulon Luxgen Dinos	

==== Subtractions ====
Date	Player	Reason	New team	Ref.
July 1, 2024	Chai Chen-Hao	Contract expired	—N/a	
July 26, 2024	Wendell Lewis	Contract expired	(Indonesia) Satria Muda Pertamina	
July 26, 2024	Tony Mitchell	Contract expired	Taoyuan Taiwan Beer Leopards	
July 30, 2024	Yang Chin-Min	Contract expired	(Taiwan) LIT basketball team coach	
July 31, 2024	Li Wei-Ting	Contract expired	(Taiwan) Kaohsiung 17LIVE Steelers	
October 18, 2024	Quincy Davis	Contract expired	(Taiwan) Yankey Ark	
June 8, 2025	Chris Johnson	Contract expired	(United States) Boston Ball Hogs	
June 10, 2025	Michael Efevberha	Contract expired	(Italy) SAP Alghero	

== Awards ==
=== Yearly awards ===
Recipient	Award	Ref.
Jeremy Lin	Clutch Play of the Year	
Jeremy Lin	All-Defensive First Team	
Jeremy Lin	All-TPBL First Team	
Jeremy Lin	Most Valuable Player	
Lin Chin-Pang	Assist of the Year	
Kenny Manigault	All-Defensive First Team	
Kenny Manigault	All-TPBL Second Team	
Jason Washburn	Most Valuable Import	
Jason Washburn	All-TPBL First Team	
Joseph Lin	All-TPBL Second Team	
Ryan Marchand	Coach of the Year	
James Mao	General Manager of the Year	

=== Finals awards ===
Recipient	Award	Ref.
New Taipei Kings	Champion	
Jeremy Lin	Finals MVP	

=== Player of the Week ===
Week	Recipient	Award	Ref.
2	Joseph Lin	Week 2 Player of the Week	
6	Jason Washburn	Week 6 Player of the Week	
9	Jason Washburn	Week 9 Player of the Week	
18	Jeremy Lin	Week 18 Player of the Week	
20	Jeremy Lin	Week 20 Player of the Week	

=== Player of the Month ===
Month	Recipient	Award	Ref.
October & November	Jeremy Lin	October & November Player of the Month (local)	
December	Jason Washburn	December Player of the Month (import)	
March	Jeremy Lin	March Player of the Month (local)	
April	Jeremy Lin	April Player of the Month (local)	
May	Jeremy Lin	May Player of the Month (local)	
