= North Texas Mean Green men's basketball statistical leaders =

The North Texas Mean Green men's basketball statistical leaders are individual statistical leaders of the North Texas Mean Green men's basketball program in various categories, including points, three-pointers, assists, blocks, rebounds, and steals. Within those areas, the lists identify single-game, single-season, and career leaders. The Mean Green represent the University of North Texas in the NCAA Division I American Conference.

North Texas began competing in intercollegiate basketball in 1916. However, the school's record book does not generally list records from before the 1950s, as records from before this period are often incomplete and inconsistent. Since scoring was much lower in this era, and teams played much fewer games during a typical season, it is likely that few or no players from this era would appear on these lists anyway.

The NCAA did not officially record assists as a stat until the 1983–84 season, and blocks and steals until the 1985–86 season, but North Texas's record books includes players in these stats before these seasons. These lists are updated through the end of the 2020–21 season.

== Scoring ==
Career
Rk	Player	Points	Seasons
1	Kenneth Lyons	2,291	1979–80 1980–81 1981–82 1982–83
2	Chris Davis	2,254	1998–99 1999–00 2000–01 2001–02 2002–03
3	Jesse Ratliff	2,130	1990–91 1991–92 1992–93 1993–94
4	Josh White	1,668	2007–08 2008–09 2009–10 2010–11
5	Tristan Thompson	1,629	2007–08 2008–09 2009–10 2010–11
6	Fred Mitchell	1,538	1974–75 1975–76 1976–77 1977–78
7	Fred Hopkins	1,535	1952–53 1953–54 1954–55 1955–56
8	Tony Worrell	1,516	1984–85 1985–86 1986–87 1987–88
9	Jordan Williams	1,501	2011–12 2012–13 2013–14 2014–15
10	John Savage	1,423	1961–62 1962–63 1963–64

Season
Rk	Player	Points	Season
1	Roosevelt Smart	742	2017–18
2	Kenneth Lyons	728	1982–83
3	Jon Manning	699	1978–79
4	Chris Davis	653	2001–02
5	Jason Edwards	650	2023–24
6	Donnell Hayden	627	1990–91
7	Tylor Perry	623	2022–23
8	Jim Mudd	605	1959–60
	Tony Worrell	605	1987–88
10	Jesse Ratliff	601	1992–93

Single game
Rk	Player	Points	Season	Opponent
1	Kenneth Lyons	47	1982–83	Louisiana Tech
2	Jesse Ratliff	45	1993–94	UT-San Antonio
3	Jim Mudd	44	1959–60	Hardin Simmons
	Donnell Hayden	44	1990–91	Nicholls State
5	Roosevelt Smart	42	2017–18	Rice
	Atin Wright	42	2024–25	Charlotte
7	Stan Blackmon	41	1973–74	Chicago State
	Jon Manning	41	1978–79	Baylor
	Garland Bailey	41	1963–64	Cincinnati
10	Fred Hopkins	40	1955–56	Trinity
	Jim Mudd	40	1958–59	Tulsa
	Rubin Russell	40	1965–66	Louisville
	Jesse Ratliff	40	1991–92	Nicholls State
	Adam Smith	40	1994–95	Texas-San Antonio
	Deginald Erskin	40	1998–99	Nevada

== Rebounds ==
Career
Rk	Player	Rebounds	Seasons
1	Ken Williams	1,095	1974–75 1975–76 1976–77 1977–78
2	Kenneth Lyons	1,020	1979–80 1980–81 1981–82 1982–83
3	Jesse Ratliff	913	1990–91 1991–92 1992–93 1993–94
4	George Odufuwa	896	2008–09 2009–10 2010–11
5	Melvin Davis	872	1974–75 1975–76 1976–77 1977–78
6	Willie Davis	847	1964–65 1965–66 1966–67 1967–68
7	John Savage	812	1961–62 1962–63 1963–64
8	David Miller	796	1994–95 1995–96 1996–97 1997–98
9	Zachary Simmons	751	2017–18 2018–19 2019–20 2020–21
10	Fred Mitchell	728	1974–75 1975–76 1976–77 1977–78

Season
Rk	Player	Rebounds	Season
1	Ken Williams	411	1977–78
2	George Odufuwa	353	2009–10
3	Ken Williams	345	1976–77
4	George Odufuwa	333	2010–11
5	Willie Davis	331	1964–65
6	Jeremy Combs	325	2015–16
7	Ronnie Morgan	305	1987–88
8	Stan Blackmon	295	1973–74
9	Melvin Davis	287	1976–77
10	John Savage	285	1961–62

Single game
Rk	Player	Rebounds	Season	Opponent
1	Ken Williams	29	1977–78	Lamar
2	Willie Davis	26	1964–65	Oklahoma City
3	Ken Williams	25	1976–77	Texas-Arlington
4	George Odufuwa	24	2009–10	Cameron
5	Willie Davis	22	1964–65	Louisville
	Ronnie Morgan	22	1986–87	S. Mississippi
	Jesse Ratliff	22	1991–92	Nicholls State
	Thomas Gipson	22	1991–92	SW Texas St.
	Zachary Simmons	22	2017–18	San Francisco
10	Al Shumate	21	1968–69	UNLV
	Stan Blackmon	21	1973–74	SMU
	Ken Williams	21	1977–78	Texas-Arlington
	Shawnson Johnson	21	2003–04	New Orleans
	Tony Mitchell	21	2011–12	Florida Atlantic

== Assists ==
Career
Rk	Player	Assists	Seasons
1	Pat Hicks	526	1979–80 1980–81 1981–82 1982–83
2	Ryan Woolridge	433	2016–17 2017–18 2018–19
3	Walter Johnson	350	1975–76 1976–77
4	Josh White	331	2007–08 2008–09 2009–10 2010–11
5	Chris Davis	296	1998–99 1999–00 2000–01 2001–02 2002–03
6	Kevie Gulley	294	1987–88 1988–89 1989–90
7	Chris Jones	282	2011–12 2012–13 2013–14
8	Javion Hamlet	274	2019–20 2020–21
9	Furmia Nealy	269	1979–80 1980–81 1981–82 1982–83
10	Deon Hunter	262	1986–87 1987–88 1988–89

Season
Rk	Player	Assists	Season
1	Ryan Woolridge	221	2017–18
2	Walter Johnson	208	1976–77
3	Pat Hicks	171	1982–83
4	David Terrell Jr.	160	2025–26
5	Pat Hicks	156	1981–82
6	Pat Hicks	154	1980–81
7	Javion Hamlet	147	2019–20
8	Ryan Woolridge	145	2018–19
9	Walter Johnson	142	1975–76
	Deon Alexander	142	1986–87

Single game
Rk	Player	Assists	Season	Opponent
1	Pat Hicks	19	1981–82	Loyola Marymount
2	Pat Hicks	16	1981–82	Pan American
3	Weasel Johnson	15	1976–77	TCU
4	Terence White	13	2000–01	A&M-CC
5	Deon Alexander	12	1986–87	Southwestern (KS)
	Charles Kearney	12	1992–93	NW (La.) St.
	Calvin Williams	12	1998–99	Nevada
8	Ricky Robertson	11	1987–88	NE Louisiana
	Tom Etchison	11	1993–94	NE Louisiana
	Calvin Williams	11	1998–99	Utah St.
	Calvin Williams	11	1999–00	Wyoming
	Ryan Woolridge	11	2017–18	Charlotte
	Ryan Woolridge	11	2017–18	Mercer
	Javion Hamlet	11	2020–21	Mississippi Valley State
	Javion Hamlet	11	2020–21	Middle Tennessee

== Steals ==
Career
Rk	Player	Steals	Seasons
1	Jesse Ratliff	151	1990–91 1991–92 1992–93 1993–94
	Ryan Woolridge	151	2016–17 2017–18 2018–19
3	David Miller	146	1994–95 1995–96 1996–97 1997–98
4	Chris Jones	127	2011–12 2012–13 2013–14
	Rubin Jones	127	2020–21 2021–22 2022–23 2023–24
6	Jerome Rogers	122	2000–01 2001–02 2002–03 2003–04
7	Jordan Williams	117	2011–12 2012–13 2013–14 2014–15
8	Isaac Hines	112	2004–05 2005–06
9	Charles Washington	109	1996–97 1997–98 1998–99
10	Tony Worrell	108	1984–85 1985–86 1986–87 1987–88

Season
Rk	Player	Steals	Season
1	Donnell Hayden	86	1990–91
2	John Horrocks	84	1981–82
3	Je'Shawn Stevenson	66	2025–26
4	Ricky Robertson	63	1988–89
	Pat Nash	63	1991–92
6	Isaac Hines	60	2004–05
7	Ryan Woolridge	58	2018–19
8	David Terrell Jr.	57	2025–26
9	Deon Alexander	56	1986–87
	Charles Washington	56	1997–98

Single game
Rk	Player	Steals	Season	Opponent
1	Donnell Hayden	9	1990–91	Tx. Southern
	Pat Nash	9	1991–92	South Alabama
3	Ryan Woolridge	8	2016–17	UTSA
4	Kevie Gulley	6	1989–90	Northwestern St.
	Donnell Hayden	6	1990–91	Alcorn St.
	Jesse Ratliff	6	1990–91	SW Texas St.
	Pat Nash	6	1991–92	Baylor
	Eric Jackson	6	1992–93	Sam Houston St.
	Charles Washington	6	1997–98	UCSB
	Deginald Erskin	6	1999–00	Buffalo
	Kenneth Mangrum	6	2000–01	A&M-CC
	Lee Green	6	2001–02	Lipscomb
	Jermaine Green	6	2002–03	Indiana
	Isaac Hines	6	2004–05	Arkansas St.
	Chris Jones	6	2012–13	UTA
	Ryan Woolridge	6	2018–19	New Mexico
	Rubin Jones	6	2023–24	Towson
	Cole Franklin	6	2025–26	Santa Clara
	Demarion Watson	6	2025–26	Rice
	Je'Shawn Stevenson	6	2025–26	UTSA

== Blocks ==
Career
Rk	Player	Blocks	Seasons
1	Tony Mitchell	157	2011–12 2012–13
2	Jeffrey Simpson	119	2004–05 2005–06
3	Quincy Williams	98	2004–05 2005–06 2006–07 2007–08
	Zachary Simmons	98	2017–18 2018–19 2019–20 2020–21
5	Aaron Scott	89	2021–22 2022–23 2023–24
6	Abou Ousmane	84	2020–21 2021–22 2022–23
7	Wendell Williams	81	1986–87 1987–88 1988–89
8	Kendrick Hogans	79	2007–08 2008–09 2010–11 2011–12
9	Thomas Gipson	76	1990–91 1991–92
10	Thomas Bell	75	2019–20 2020–21 2021–22

Season
Rk	Player	Blocks	Season
1	Tony Mitchell	87	2012–13
2	Tony Mitchell	70	2011–12
3	Shawnson Johnson	69	2003–04
4	Jeffrey Simpson	68	2005–06
5	Thomas Gipson	53	1991–92
6	Jeffrey Simpson	51	2004–05
7	Abou Ousmane	45	2022–23
	Aaron Scott	45	2023–24
9	Jason Miller	40	2000–01
10	Brenen Lorient	39	2024–25

Single game
Rk	Player	Blocks	Season	Opponent
1	Jason Miller	8	2000–01	New Mexico St.
	Shawnson Johnson	8	2003–04	New Orleans
3	Deginald Erskin	7	1998–99	Arkansas
	Jeffrey Simpson	7	2005–06	Middle Tenn.
5	Jeffrey Simpson	6	2004–05	New Mexico St.
	Jeffrey Simpson	6	2004–05	New Orleans
	Tony Mitchell	6	2011–12	Arkansas State
	Tony Mitchell	6	2011–12	Florida Atlantic
	Tony Mitchell	6	2011–12	ULM
	Tony Mitchell	6	2011–12	Louisiana-Lafayette
	Aaron Scott	6	2023–24	Fordham
