= Long Lions Basketball Club =

Long Lions Basketball Club (龙狮篮球俱乐部) may refer to:

- Guangzhou Long-Lions (Chinese Basketball Association)
- Eastern Sports Club (basketball), also known as Eastern Long Lions (ASEAN Basketball League)
- Macau Black Bears, formerly the Nanhai Long-Lions (ASEAN Basketball League)
