= 2024–25 East Asia Super League =

Sports season

East Asia Super League
- Season: 2024–25
- Duration: 2 October 2024 – 9 March 2025
- Teams: 10

Final Four
- Champions: (Japan) Hiroshima Dragonflies (1st title)
- Runners-up: (Chinese Taipei) Taoyuan Pauian Pilots
- Third place: (Chinese Taipei) New Taipei Kings
- Fourth place: (Japan) Ryukyu Golden Kings
- Final Four MVP: (United States) Dwayne Evans (Hiroshima Dragonflies)

Seasons
- ← 2023–24 2025–26 →

The 2024–25 East Asia Super League was the second regular season of the East Asia Super League, an international basketball club competition involving teams from Hong Kong, Japan, Macau, South Korea, Philippines and Taiwan. The season began on 2 October 2024 and ended on 9 March 2025.

The Final Four was held in Macau. The Hiroshima Dragonflies won their first title after defeating the Taoyuan Pauian Pilots in the final.

== Teams ==
=== Allocation ===
The 2024–25 East Asia Super League has ten teams, two more compared the last season. Like the last season, the finalist of the Taiwan's (Chinese Taipei) P. League+, Japan's B.League and South Korea's Korean Basketball League qualified and took part for the 2024–25 season alongside two teams from the Philippine Basketball Association (PBA).

The allocation process for Philippine teams was not immediately known since the PBA has two conferences or tournaments for its 2023–24 season. The PBA decided to send the champions of those two conferences.

On 14 August 2024, a team each from Hong Kong and Macau were announced as expansion teams. Eastern in particular are contracted to participate regardless of placing in the domestic league.

League	Country or region	Berths
P. League+	Chinese Taipei (Note: Taiwan, officially Republic of China. The organizers of the EASL and FIBA uses the designation of "Chinese Taipei".)	2
B.League	Japan	2
Korean Basketball League	South Korea	2
Philippine Basketball Association	Philippines	2
Expansion teams	Hong Kong	1
Expansion teams	Macau	1

==== Qualified teams ====
Team	Domestic league standing
(Chinese Taipei) New Taipei Kings	2023–24 P. League+ champion
(Chinese Taipei) Taoyuan Pauian Pilots	2023–24 P. League+ runner-up
(Japan) Hiroshima Dragonflies	2023–24 B.League champion
(Japan) Ryukyu Golden Kings	2023–24 B.League runner-up
(South Korea) Busan KCC Egis	2023–24 Korean Basketball League champion
(South Korea) Suwon KT Sonicboom	2023–24 Korean Basketball League runner-up
(Philippines) San Miguel Beermen	2023–24 PBA Commissioner's Cup champion
(Philippines) Meralco Bolts	2024 PBA Philippine Cup champion
Hong Kong Eastern	2023–24 Hong Kong A1 Division Championship champion
Macau Black Bears	2024 Macau Senior Category of the Silver Medal Basketball Tournament champion

=== Foreign and heritage players ===
The EASL allows a maximum of two foreign players or imports. Additionally teams are allowed to have one additional heritage or naturalized player.

Club	Imports		Asian heritage player	Naturalized player	Former players
(Chinese Taipei) New Taipei Kings			(Palestine) Sani Sakakini	—N/a	
(Chinese Taipei) Taoyuan Pauian Pilots			—N/a	—N/a	
(Japan) Hiroshima Dragonflies			—N/a	(South Africa) Tshilidzi Kawata	(United States) Ira Brown
(Japan) Ryukyu Golden Kings			—N/a	(United States) Alex Kirk	
(South Korea) Busan KCC Egis	(United States) Leon Williams	(Haiti) Cady Lalanne	(Philippines) Calvin Epistola	—N/a	(United States) Deonte Burton
(South Korea) Suwon KT Sonicboom	(United States) Rayshaun Hammonds	(Cuba) Ismael Romero	—N/a	—N/a	(United States) Jeremiah Tilmon
(Philippines) San Miguel Beermen	(United States) Torren Jones	(Trinidad and Tobago) Jabari Narcis	—N/a	—N/a	(United States) EJ Anosike (United States) Quincy Miller
(Philippines) Meralco Bolts	(United States) D. J. Kennedy	(Panama) Akil Mitchell	—N/a	(Senegal) Ange Kouame	(United States) Allen Durham
Hong Kong Eastern	(United States) Cameron Clark	(Canada) Chris McLaughlin	—N/a	—N/a	
Macau Black Bears	(Malta) Samuel Deguara	(United States) Adonis Thomas	(Palestine) Jamal Mayali	—N/a	(United States) Will Artino (Haiti) Jeantal Cylla (Malaysia) Ting Chun Hong

== Draw ==
The result of the draw for the group stage of the 2024–25 season was announced in April 2024 at the time when only the Korean Basketball League qualifying teams are already known; but the champions and runner-up Korean teams are still to be determined. For the placeholder teams team 1 would be the champions, and team 2 would be the runners-up. For the Philippines' case it was the PBA Commissioner's Cup champions which was designated as Team 1 and the PBA Philippine Cup champions as Team 2.

The Hong Kong and Macau team were belatedly added to Group A and Group B respectively.

== Group stage ==
=== Group A ===
Pos	Team	Pld	W	L	PF	PA	PD	PCT	Qualification
1	(Japan) Hiroshima Dragonflies	6	5	1	517	450	+67	.833	Advance to semifinals
2	(Chinese Taipei) Taoyuan Pauian Pilots	6	4	2	544	459	+85	.667	Advance to semifinals
3	Hong Kong Eastern	6	3	3	427	450	−23	.500 (Note: Hong Kong Eastern 1–0 Suwon KT Sonicboom)	
4	(South Korea) Suwon KT Sonicboom	6	3	3	456	500	−44	.500	
5	(Philippines) San Miguel Beermen	6	0	6	446	531	−85	.000	

Source: EASL
Notes:

2 October 2024	San Miguel Beermen (Philippines)	81–87	(South Korea) Suwon KT Sonicboom	Pasay
18:10 (PST)	Scoring by quarter: 20–23, 23–16, 19–29, 19–19
	Pts: Anosike 34; Rebs: Fajardo 9 Asts: Anosike, Ross 4	Boxscore	Pts: Hammonds 39; Rebs: Hammonds 14; Asts: Heo 9	Arena: Mall of Asia Arena

16 October 2024	Hiroshima Dragonflies (Japan)	78–67	Hong Kong Eastern	Fukuyama
19:10 (JST)	Scoring by quarter: 25–18, 17–12, 15–18, 21–19
	Pts: Blackshear 17; Rebs: Blackshear 11; Asts: Blackshear 5	Boxscore	Pts: Clark 24; Rebs: McLaughlin 12; Asts: Clark, Yang 2	Arena: F-PICO Arena; Attendance: 864

23 October 2024	Suwon KT Sonicboom (South Korea)	70–91	(Chinese Taipei) Taoyuan Pauian Pilots	Suwon
19:10 (KST)	Scoring by quarter: 26–19, 17–25, 20–22, 7–25
	Pts: Heo 21; Rebs: Tilmon 8 Asts: Heo 4	Boxscore	Pts: Graham 32; Rebs: Graham, Pai 11; Asts: Graham, Lu 5	Arena: Suwon KT Sonicboom Arena

30 October 2024	Hong Kong Eastern	75–88	(Japan) Hiroshima Dragonflies	Hong Kong
19:40 (HKT)	Scoring by quarter: 19–20, 25–17, 14–27, 17–24
	Pts: McLaughlin 24; Rebs: McLaughlin 14; Asts: Chan 6	Boxscore	Pts: Blackshear 25; Rebs: Blackshear 10; Asts: Blackshear 5	Arena: Southorn Stadium; Attendance: 1,788

13 November 2024	San Miguel Beermen (Philippines)	85–101	(Chinese Taipei) Taoyuan Pauian Pilots	Pasig
18:10 (PST)	Scoring by quarter: 20–25, 13–32, 23–26, 29–18
	Pts: Miller 32; Rebs: Fajardo 11; Asts: Perez 3	Boxscore	Pts: Brown 27; Rebs: Brown 9 Asts: Graham 7	Arena: PhilSports Arena

4 December 2024	Suwon KT Sonicboom (South Korea)	80–78	(Japan) Hiroshima Dragonflies	Suwon
19:10 (KST)	Scoring by quarter: 20–23, 16–15, 23–23, 21–17
	Pts: Hammonds 23; Rebs: Hammonds 14; Asts: Choi C. 8	Boxscore	Pts: Evans 19; Rebs: Evans, Mayo 11; Asts: Mayo 8	Arena: Suwon KT Sonicboom Arena

11 December 2024	Taoyuan Pauian Pilots (Chinese Taipei)	100–64	(South Korea) Suwon KT Sonicboom	Macau
19:10 (MST)	Scoring by quarter: 34–17, 18–13, 23–22, 25–12
	Pts: Graham 27; Rebs: Dieng 13; Asts: seven players 3	Boxscore	Pts: Hammonds 15; Rebs: Hammonds 7 Asts: Moon J. 4	Arena: Studio City Event Center

18 December 2024	Hong Kong Eastern	71–62	(Philippines) San Miguel Beermen	Hong Kong
20:10 (HKT)	Scoring by quarter: 28–14, 20–20, 12–14, 11–14
	Pts: Lam 19; Rebs: McLaughlin 17; Asts: McLaughlin 4	Boxscore	Pts: Jones, Fajardo 19; Rebs: Jones 11; Asts: Ross 4	Arena: Southorn Stadium

25 December 2024	Taoyuan Pauian Pilots (Chinese Taipei)	73–84	(Japan) Hiroshima Dragonflies	Taoyuan City
20:10 (TST)	Scoring by quarter: 16–26, 21–27, 23–14, 13–17
	Pts: Lu 21; Rebs: Jones 13; Asts: Pai 7	Boxscore	Pts: Evans 33; Rebs: Blackshear, Evans 11; Asts: Blackshear 3	Arena: Taoyuan Arena

7 January 2025	Hong Kong Eastern	69–61	(South Korea) Suwon KT Sonicboom	Hong Kong
19:10 (HKT)	Scoring by quarter: 19–7, 17–16, 16–19, 17–19
	Pts: Clark 17; Rebs: McLaughlin 11; Asts: Yang 6	Boxscore	Pts: Romero 15; Rebs: Romero 10; Asts: Park S.J. 3	Arena: Southorn Stadium; Attendance: 1,200

8 January 2025	Hiroshima Dragonflies (Japan)	94–63	(Philippines) San Miguel Beermen	Hiroshima
19:10 (JST)	Scoring by quarter: 30–18, 22–19, 16–14, 26–12
	Pts: Mayo, Mitani 18; Rebs: Blackshear 15; Asts: Blackshear 9	Boxscore	Pts: Jones 24; Rebs: Jones 13; Asts: Cruz 7	Arena: Hiroshima Sun Plaza

15 January 2025	San Miguel Beermen (Philippines)	74–84	Hong Kong Eastern	Pasig
20:10 (PST)	Scoring by quarter: 11–30, 21–18, 18–22, 24–14
	Pts: Fajardo, Trollano 20; Rebs: Fajardo 13; Asts: Trollano 5	Boxscore	Pts: Clark 25; Rebs: McLaughlin 17; Asts: Blankley 6	Arena: PhilSports Arena

22 January 2025	Hiroshima Dragonflies (Japan)	95–92	(Chinese Taipei) Taoyuan Pauian Pilots	Fukuyama
19:10 (JST)	Scoring by quarter: 30–18, 30–29, 16–18, 19–27
	Pts: Yamazaki 19; Rebs: Blackshear 10; Asts: Blackshear 5	Boxscore	Pts: Brown 27; Rebs: Graham 8 Asts: Graham 6	Arena: F-PICO Arena

5 February 2025	Taoyuan Pauian Pilots (Chinese Taipei)	87–61	Hong Kong Eastern	Taoyuan City
19:10 (TST)	Scoring by quarter: 32–7, 13–22, 24–19, 18–13
	Pts: Lu 33; Rebs: Dieng 15; Asts: three players 3	Boxscore	Pts: Yang 16; Rebs: McLaughlin 11; Asts: Chan 4	Arena: Taoyuan Arena

12 February 2025	Suwon KT Sonicboom (South Korea)	94–81	(Philippines) San Miguel Beermen	Suwon
19:10 (KST)	Scoring by quarter: 39–15, 14–26, 22–15, 19–25
	Pts: Hammonds 19; Rebs: Romero 15; Asts: Romero 8	Boxscore	Pts: Teng 17; Rebs: Brondial 8 Asts: Ross 3	Arena: Suwon KT Sonicboom Arena; Attendance: 641

=== Group B ===
Pos	Team	Pld	W	L	PF	PA	PD	PCT	Qualification
1	(Japan) Ryukyu Golden Kings	6	5	1	498	493	+5	.833	Advance to semifinals
2	(Chinese Taipei) New Taipei Kings	6	4	2	594	532	+62	.667	Advance to semifinals
3	Macau Black Bears	6	3	3	582	579	+3	.500	
4	(Philippines) Meralco Bolts	6	2	4	487	509	−22	.333	
5	(South Korea) Busan KCC Egis	6	1	5	496	544	−48	.167	

Source: EASL

2 October 2024	Meralco Bolts (Philippines)	97–85	Macau Black Bears	Pasay
20:10 (PST)	Scoring by quarter: 24–17, 19–22, 30–25, 24–21
	Pts: Newsome 18; Rebs: Durham 11; Asts: Kennedy 7	Boxscore	Pts: Artino, Cylla 23; Rebs: Artino 14; Asts: Chong Qui 4	Arena: Mall of Asia Arena

16 October 2024	Ryukyu Golden Kings (Japan)	77–74	(Philippines) Meralco Bolts	Okinawa
19:40 (JST)	Scoring by quarter: 23–18, 28–17, 15–22, 11–17
	Pts: Cooley, Law 18; Rebs: Law 12; Asts: Kishimoto, Law 5	Boxscore	Pts: Kennedy 30; Rebs: Kennedy 12; Asts: Durham 5	Arena: Okinawa Arena; Attendance: 7,347

23 October 2024	New Taipei Kings (Chinese Taipei)	97–109	Macau Black Bears	New Taipei City
19:10 (TST)	Scoring by quarter: 23–34, 26–21, 26–25, 22–29
	Pts: Manigault 25; Rebs: Manigault 11; Asts: Manigault 7	Boxscore	Pts: Cylla 32; Rebs: Artino 11; Asts: Chong Qui 11	Arena: Xinzhuang Gymnasium

30 October 2024	Macau Black Bears	93–96	(Japan) Ryukyu Golden Kings	Macau
20:10 (MST)	Scoring by quarter: 28–25, 25–23, 20–24, 20–24
	Pts: Chong Qui 24; Rebs: Artino 20; Asts: Chong Qui, Artino 5	Boxscore	Pts: Aluma 29; Rebs: Cooley 19; Asts: Kishimoto 12	Arena: Studio City Event Center

6 November 2024	Macau Black Bears	111–97	(South Korea) Busan KCC Egis	Macau
19:10 (MST)	Scoring by quarter: 32–34, 29–22, 23–18, 27–23
	Pts: Cylla 34; Rebs: Deguara 13; Asts: Chong Qui 12	Boxscore	Pts: Burton 35; Rebs: Williams 16; Asts: Burton 11	Arena: Studio City Event Center

13 November 2024	Meralco Bolts (Philippines)	81–80	(South Korea) Busan KCC Egis	Pasig
20:10 (PST)	Scoring by quarter: 20–26, 22–27, 21–15, 18–12
	Pts: Mitchell 33; Rebs: Mitchell 22; Asts: Kennedy 5	Boxscore	Pts: Burton 26; Rebs: Williams 13; Asts: Burton 5	Arena: PhilSports Arena

4 December 2024	Ryukyu Golden Kings (Japan)	91–82	(South Korea) Busan KCC Egis	Okinawa
19:40 (JST)	Scoring by quarter: 25–27, 20–11, 26–25, 20–19
	Pts: Cooley 29; Rebs: Cooley 18; Asts: Taira 4	Boxscore	Pts: Burton 38; Rebs: Burton 5 Asts: Lee H. 6	Arena: Okinawa Arena; Attendance: 7,002

11 December 2024	Macau Black Bears	95–114	(Chinese Taipei) New Taipei Kings	Macau
21:10 (MST)	Scoring by quarter: 17–33, 29–28, 17–35, 32–18
	Pts: Chong Qui 32; Rebs: Deguara 15; Asts: Chong Qui 11	Boxscore	Pts: Je. Lin 27; Rebs: Je. Lin 7 Asts: Je. Lin 6	Arena: Studio City Event Center

18 December 2024	Busan KCC Egis (South Korea)	72–68	(Philippines) Meralco Bolts	Busan
19:10 (KST)	Scoring by quarter: 13–12, 18–19, 20–19, 21–18
	Pts: Heo 31; Rebs: Burton 14; Asts: Burton 5	Boxscore	Pts: Kennedy 23; Rebs: Mitchell 18; Asts: Newsome 4	Arena: Busan Sajik Gymnasium; Attendance: 1,644

25 December 2024	Ryukyu Golden Kings (Japan)	82–74	(Chinese Taipei) New Taipei Kings	Okinawa
19:40 (JST)	Scoring by quarter: 25–21, 21–17, 14–19, 22–17
	Pts: Aluma 21; Rebs: Cooley 14; Asts: Waki 4	Boxscore	Pts: Manigault 19; Rebs: Sakakini 10; Asts: Je. Lin 4	Arena: Okinawa Arena; Attendance: 7,508

8 January 2025	New Taipei Kings (Chinese Taipei)	99–63	(Japan) Ryukyu Golden Kings	New Taipei City
19:10 (TST)	Scoring by quarter: 19–12, 20–10, 31–10, 29–31
	Pts: Je. Lin 26; Rebs: Manigault 11; Asts: Je. Lin 7	Boxscore	Pts: Cooley 13; Rebs: Cooley 10; Asts: Law 4	Arena: Xinzhuang Gymnasium

15 January 2025	Busan KCC Egis (South Korea)	78–89	Macau Black Bears	Busan
19:10 (KST)	Scoring by quarter: 24–21, 17–19, 19–22, 18–27
	Pts: Lalanne 27; Rebs: Lalanne 13; Asts: Heo 12	Boxscore	Pts: Deguara 24; Rebs: Deguara 19; Asts: Chong Qui 11	Arena: Busan Sajik Gymnasium; Attendance: 1,441

21 January 2025	Busan KCC Egis (South Korea)	87–104	(Chinese Taipei) New Taipei Kings	Busan
19:10 (KST)	Scoring by quarter: 21–28, 23–30, 23–24, 20–22
	Pts: Lalanne 31; Rebs: Lalanne 13; Asts: Lee J., Lee S. 4	Boxscore	Pts: Lee 19; Rebs: Manigault 10; Asts: Manigault 10	Arena: Busan Sajik Gymnasium; Attendance: 1,448

22 January 2025	Meralco Bolts (Philippines)	71–89	(Japan) Ryukyu Golden Kings	Pasig
20:10 (PST)	Scoring by quarter: 22–23, 19–27, 15–25, 15–14
	Pts: Hodge, Kouame 13; Rebs: Hodge 7 Asts: Quinto 6	Boxscore	Pts: Law 20; Rebs: Law, Kirk 8 Asts: Law 5	Arena: PhilSports Arena

12 February 2025	New Taipei Kings (Chinese Taipei)	106–96(2OT)	(Philippines) Meralco Bolts	Taipei City
19:10 (TST)	Scoring by quarter: 24–25, 18–19, 15–23, 21–11, Overtime: 13–13, 15–5
	Pts: Sakakini 31; Rebs: Manigault 14; Asts: Jo. Lin 7	Boxscore	Pts: Kennedy 21; Rebs: Mitchell 9 Asts: Mitchell 8	Arena: University of Taipei, Tian-Mu Campus Gymnasium

== Final four ==
The final four was held at the Studio City Event Center in Macau, China.

Semifinals
(Japan) Hiroshima Dragonflies	81
(Chinese Taipei) New Taipei Kings	65
(Japan) Ryukyu Golden Kings	64
(Chinese Taipei) Taoyuan Pauian Pilots	71

Finals
(Japan) Hiroshima Dragonflies	84
(Chinese Taipei) Taoyuan Pauian Pilots	80
Third place
(Chinese Taipei) New Taipei Kings	72
(Japan) Ryukyu Golden Kings	68

=== Semifinals ===
Note: All times are Macau Standard Time (UTC+8)

7 March 2025
18:40

Boxscore

Hiroshima Dragonflies (Japan)	81–65	(Chinese Taipei) New Taipei Kings
Scoring by quarter: 15–19, 25–22, 28–19, 13–5
Pts: Evans 20; Rebs: Evans 16; Asts: three players 3		Pts: Jo. Lin 17; Rebs: Daye 10; Asts: Lee, Jo. Lin 4

Studio City Event Center, Macau
Attendance: 1,721

7 March 2025
21:10

Boxscore

Ryukyu Golden Kings (Japan)	64–71	(Chinese Taipei) Taoyuan Pauian Pilots
Scoring by quarter: 10–19, 18–18, 22–14, 14–20
Pts: Kirk 13; Rebs: three players 10; Asts: Aluma 4		Pts: Lu 24; Rebs: Brown 8 Asts: Graham 4

Studio City Event Center, Macau
Attendance: 1,721

=== Third place game ===
9 March 2025
16:10

Boxscore

New Taipei Kings (Chinese Taipei)	84–80	(Japan) Ryukyu Golden Kings
Scoring by quarter: 20–19, 19–22, 18–20, 27–19
Pts: Je. Lin 18; Rebs: Manigault 9 Asts: Jo. Lin 5		Pts: Kirk 27; Rebs: Aluma 14; Asts: Arakawa, Kishimoto 5

Studio City Event Center, Macau

=== Finals ===
9 March 2025
19:10

Boxscore

Hiroshima Dragonflies (Japan)	72–68	(Chinese Taipei) Taoyuan Pauian Pilots
Scoring by quarter: 19–18, 16–11, 16–20, 21–19
Pts: Evans 18; Rebs: Blackshear 15; Asts: Blackshear 6		Pts: Lu 20; Rebs: Brown 8 Asts: three players 3

Studio City Event Center, Macau
Attendance: 2,288

== Individual awards ==
- Final Four MVP: Dwayne Evans, Hiroshima Dragonflies
