= 1987–88 North Texas State Mean Green men's basketball team =

American college basketball season

1987–88 North Texas State Mean Green men's basketball

Southland Regular season champions Southland tournament champions

NCAA tournament
- Conference: Southland Conference
- West
- Record: 17–13 (12–2 Southland Belt)
- Head coach: Jimmy Gales (2nd season)
- Home arena: Super Pit

1987–88 Southland Conference men's basketball standings
	Conf.				Overall
Team	W		L	PCT	W		L	PCT
North Texas State †	12	–	2	.857	17	–	13	.567
Northeast Louisiana	10	–	4	.714	21	–	9	.700
Sam Houston State	9	–	5	.643	14	–	14	.500
Northwestern State	7	–	7	.500	16	–	12	.571
Southwest Texas State	6	–	8	.429	9	–	22	.290
Stephen F. Austin	4	–	10	.286	10	–	18	.357
McNeese State	4	–	10	.286	7	–	22	.241
Texas-Arlington	4	–	10	.286	7	–	22	.241
† 1988 Southland Conference tournament winner Rankings from AP Poll

The 1987–88 North Texas State Mean Green men's basketball team (often referred to as "North Texas" or the "Mean Green") represented the University of North Texas as a member of the Southland Conference during the 1987–88 college basketball season. The team was led by head coach Jimmy Gales and played their home games at the Super Pit in Denton, Texas. After winning the conference regular season title, the Mean Green followed that success by winning the Southland tournament to receive an automatic bid to the NCAA tournament. Making the school's first appearance in the NCAA Tournament and playing as the No. 15 seed in the West region, the Mean Green were beaten by No. 2 seed North Carolina in the opening round. The team finished with a record of 17–13 (12–2 Southland).

== Roster ==
1987–88 North Texas Mean Green men's basketball team
Players
Coaches

Pos.	#	Name	Height	Weight	Year	Hometown
G	10	Ricky Robertson	6 ft 2 in (1.88 m)	—	Jr
G	11	Kevie Gulley	6 ft 0 in (1.83 m)	—	Fr
G	12	Robert Greene	6 ft 2 in (1.88 m)	—	Fr
F	15	Reco McCarter	6 ft 4 in (1.93 m)	—	Jr
G	20	Tim Duryea	6 ft 2 in (1.88 m)	—	Sr
F	21	Andrien Choplick	6 ft 9 in (2.06 m)	—	So
G	22	Deon Hunter	5 ft 9 in (1.75 m)	—	Jr
G	32	William Smith	6 ft 3 in (1.91 m)	—	Jr
F	33	Wendell Williams	6 ft 7 in (2.01 m)	—	Jr
G	34	Dave Whittington	6 ft 8 in (2.03 m)	—	Sr
F	42	Tony Worrell	6 ft 7 in (2.01 m)	—	Sr	Goldsboro, North Carolina
F	44	Tony Northcross	6 ft 6 in (1.98 m)	—	Fr
F	50	Ronnie Morgan	6 ft 8 in (2.03 m)	—	Fr

Head coach

- Jimmy Gales

Assistant coach(es)

Legend

- (C) Team captain
- (S) Suspended
- (I) Ineligible
- (W) Walk-on
- Injured
- Current redshirt

Roster

== Schedule and results ==
Date time, TV	Rank^{#}	Opponent^{#}	Result	Record	Site (attendance) city, state
Non-conference Regular season
Nov 28, 1987*		at Oral Roberts	W 88–80	1–0	Mabee Center; Tulsa, Oklahoma
Dec 1, 1987*		Baylor	L 63–72	1–1	Super Pit; Denton, Texas
Dec 4, 1987*		at No. 8 Missouri; Wadsworth Show-Me Classic	L 56–64	1–2	Hearnes Center; Columbia, Missouri
Dec 5, 1987*		vs. Alcorn State; Wadsworth Show-Me Classic	L 64–70	1–3	Hearnes Center; Columbia, Missouri
Dec 7, 1987*		Montana State	L 55–65	1–4	Super Pit; Denton, Texas
Dec 9, 1987*		TCU	W 79–54	2–4	Super Pit; Denton, Texas
Dec 12, 1987*		at Colorado State	L 56–65	2–5	Moby Arena; Fort Collins, Colorado
Dec 19, 1987*		vs. Southern Miss	L 80–83	2–6	
Dec 22, 1987*		at New Mexico State	L 71–91	2–7	Pan American Center; Las Cruces, New Mexico
Dec 26, 1987*		at New Mexico	L 69–77	2–8	University Arena; Albuquerque, New Mexico
Dec 27, 1987*		vs. Long Beach State	L 88–89	2–9	
Jan 14, 1988*		at Alcorn State	W 85–80	3–9	Davey Whitney Complex; Lorman, Mississippi
Southland Regular season
Jan 16, 1988		at UT Arlington	W 77–68	4–9 (1–0)	Texas Hall; Arlington, Texas
Non-conference Regular season
Jan 18, 1988*		at Oklahoma State	L 82–92	4–10	Gallagher-Iba Arena; Stillwater, Oklahoma
Southland Regular season
Jan 21, 1988		Northwestern State	W 87–75	5–10 (2–0)	Super Pit; Denton, Texas
Jan 23, 1988		Louisiana-Monroe	L 69–79	5–11 (2–1)	Super Pit; Denton, Texas
Feb 25, 1988		at Louisiana-Monroe	W 67–65	13–12 (10–2)	Fant-Ewing Coliseum; Monroe, Louisiana
Feb 27, 1988		at Northwestern State	W 76–61	14–12 (11–2)	Prather Coliseum; Natchitoches, Louisiana
Mar 3, 1988		UT Arlington	W 83–74	15–12 (12–2)	Super Pit; Denton, Texas
Southland tournament
Mar 9, 1988*		McNeese State; Semifinals	W 82–61	16–12	Super Pit; Denton, Texas
Mar 10, 1988*		Louisiana-Monroe; Championship game	W 87–70	17–12	Super Pit; Denton, Texas
NCAA tournament
Mar 17, 1988*	(15 W)	vs. (2 W) No. 7 North Carolina; First Round	L 65–83	17–13	Jon M. Huntsman Center; Salt Lake City, Utah
*Non-conference game. ^{#}Rankings from Coaches Poll. (#) Tournament seedings in parentheses. W=West. All times are in Central Time.
