= 1988 Southland Conference men's basketball tournament =

- Classification: Division I
- Season: 1987–88
- Teams: 6
- First round site: Campus Sites; Campus Arenas
- Finals site: UNT Coliseum; Denton, Texas
- Champions: North Texas State (1st title)
- Winning coach: Jimmy Gales (1st title)
- MVP: Tony Worrell (North Texas)

1987–88 Southland Conference men's basketball standings
	Conf.				Overall
Team	W		L	PCT	W		L	PCT
North Texas State †	12	–	2	.857	17	–	13	.567
Northeast Louisiana	10	–	4	.714	21	–	9	.700
Sam Houston State	9	–	5	.643	14	–	14	.500
Northwestern State	7	–	7	.500	16	–	12	.571
Texas State	6	–	8	.429	9	–	22	.290
Stephen F. Austin	4	–	10	.286	10	–	18	.357
McNeese State	4	–	10	.286	7	–	22	.241
Texas-Arlington	4	–	10	.286	7	–	22	.241
† 1988 Southland Conference tournament winner Rankings from AP Poll

The 1988 Southland Conference men's basketball tournament was held March 8–10, 1988 with quarterfinal matchups being held at the home arena of the higher seed and the semifinals and championship game played at UNT Coliseum in Denton, Texas.

North Texas State defeated Northeast Louisiana in the championship game, 87–70, to win their first Southland men's basketball tournament.

The Mean Green received a bid to the 1988 NCAA Tournament as No. 15 seed in the West region. They were the only Southland member invited to the NCAA tournament. Conference tournament runner-up Northeast Louisiana was invited to the 1988 NIT Tournament.

== Format ==
Six of eight of the conference's members participated in the tournament field. They were seeded based on regular season conference records, with the top two seeds earning byes into the semifinal round. New conference members Sam Houston State and Stephen F. Austin did not participate. The other four teams began play in the quarterfinal round.

First round games were played at the home court of the higher-seeded team. All remaining games were played at UNT Coliseum in Denton, Texas.

== Bracket ==
Quarterfinals; Tuesday, March 8
4	Southwest Texas State	79
5	McNeese State	87
3	Northwestern State	69
6	Texas-Arlington	74

Semifinals; Wednesday, March 9
1	North Texas State	82
5	McNeese State	61
6	Texas-Arlington	63
2	NE Louisiana	78

Championship; Thursday, March 10
1	North Texas State	87
2	NE Louisiana	70
