= Tony Mitchell (basketball, born 1992) =

American basketball player

Free agent
- Position: Power forward

Personal information
- Born: April 7, 1992 (age 34) Milwaukee, Wisconsin, U.S.
- Listed height: 6 ft 7 in (2.01 m)
- Listed weight: 235 lb (107 kg)

Career information
- High school: L. G. Pinkston (West Dallas, Texas)
- College: North Texas (2011–2013)
- NBA draft: 2013: 2nd round, 37th overall pick
- Drafted by: Detroit Pistons
- Playing career: 2013–present

Career history
- 2013–2014: Detroit Pistons
- 2013–2014: →Fort Wayne Mad Ants
- 2014: →Grand Rapids Drive
- 2015: Atléticos de San Germán
- 2015–2016: Cocodrilos de Caracas
- 2016: Guangxi Rhinos
- 2016–2017: Maccabi Haifa
- 2017: Star Hotshots
- 2017: Metros de Santiago
- 2018: Cocodrilos de Caracas
- 2018–2019: Fubon Braves
- 2019: NLEX Road Warriors
- 2019: Metros de Santiago
- 2020: Leones de Ponce
- 2021: Pueblo Nuevo Básquet
- 2021: Club Rafael Barias
- 2021: Libertadores de Querétaro
- 2021: Gladiadores de Anzoátegui
- 2022: Club Trouville
- 2022: Indomables de Ciudad Juárez
- 2022: Urunday Universitario
- 2022: Maccabi Haifa
- 2022: Al-Naft SC
- 2023: Cocodrilos de Caracas
- 2023–2024: New Taipei Kings
- 2026: Macau Black Knights

Career highlights
- P. League+ champion (2024); Super Basketball League champion (2019); First-team All-Sun Belt (2012); Second-team All-Sun Belt (2013); Sun Belt Freshman of the Year (2012)
- Stats at NBA.com
- Stats at Basketball Reference
Medals
Men's basketball
Representing the United States
FIBA Americas U18 Championship
Gold medal – first place	2010 San Antonio	Team

Tony LaShae Mitchell Jr. (born April 7, 1992) is an American professional basketball player who last played for the Macau Black Knights of the Philippine Basketball Association (PBA). He competed in college for North Texas. Mitchell is 6 ft 7 in (2.01 m), weighs 235 pounds and plays the power forward position. Mitchell was selected in the 2013 NBA draft in the second round (37th pick overall).

== High school career ==
Mitchell played three years of prep basketball. For his career, he posted over 1,500 points and 700 rebounds. As a senior at L. G. Pinkston High School he averaged 20.5 points, 13.2 rebounds, 4.4 assists and 4.1 blocks per game while leading his school to a 26–10 record and a berth in the Class 4A Region II Tournament. In one playoff game against Lincoln High School he recorded 25 points, 20 rebounds and five blocks in an overtime win. Mitchell was ranked as the #12 overall senior recruit in the class of 2010 by Rivals.com. His accolades also included being named the 2010 Dallas Morning News Player of the Year – beating out Perry Jones III, a future first round NBA Draft pick out of Baylor; a SLAM Magazine All-American; Texas' 12-4A Player of the Year; Texas Class 4A All-State selection; and being chosen to the Texas Association of Basketball Coaches All-Star Team.

=== NCAA eligibility issues ===
Mitchell attended a public high school in Atlanta (Dutchtown High School) for his freshman year then in Dallas sophomore years, but under the advice of his Amateur Athletic Union basketball coach he transferred to Center of Life Christian Academy (CLCA) in Miami. What he did not realize until the latter portion of his junior year there, however, was that CLCA was not an accredited prep school, and therefore only a fraction of his coursework counted toward NCAA eligibility. Mitchell transferred back home to Pinkston to finish his prep career. To make up for lost time at CLCA, he attempted to take make-up classes at a faster rate than the school district allowed. After an investigation into his course load, and upon discovering Mitchell's attempted expedition of his graduation requirements, his transcript got invalidated and his high school graduation was postponed while he struggled with Texas' exit test.

Mitchell had already committed to play for the Missouri Tigers while these issues unfolded. Forced to stay at home in Dallas for the entire first semester of what would have been his freshman year playing for Missouri, it was not until the start of the second semester when he found out that he would never be allowed to suit up for the Tigers. Mitchell then had to choose one of two routes: either play junior college basketball for two seasons, or play for a different four-year institution as a partial qualifier. He chose to play as a partial qualifier for North Texas, the local Division I school whose coach, Johnny Jones, had aggressively recruited him during his high school years.

== College career ==
=== Freshman season ===
After sitting out the 2010–11 season due to his eligibility issues, Mitchell officially began his collegiate career as a redshirt freshman in 2011–12. He quickly established himself as a premier player in both the Sun Belt Conference as well as nationally; Mitchell was named by CBS Sports as one of the "top 10 freshmen in the country" and their third-best "under the radar" player after averaging 14.7 points and 10.3 rebounds per game. Along with Kentucky's Anthony Davis, he was one of only two freshmen in NCAA Division I to average a double-double (Davis was also that season's national player of the year and the first overall draft pick in the ensuing NBA draft). Among freshmen, only Davis' 10.4 rebounds per game average exceeded Mitchell's. He set school records for single season blocks (70) and blocks per game (3.04), while his single game top scoring and rebounding performances were 34 and 21, respectively. Despite the team not qualifying for any postseason tournaments, Mitchell still received awards and honors for his personal play. He became just the second player in league history to earn three consecutive Sun Belt Player of the Week awards while also becoming just the third player to be named the league's freshman of the year and earn a first team all-conference selection simultaneously. Mitchell was named to the All-2012 Sun Belt Conference tournament team after leading the Mean Green to the championship game before losing to Western Kentucky, 74 to 70. According to his North Texas player page, "In league-only games, Mitchell led the Sun Belt in scoring (15.9 ppg), rebounding (11.8 rpg), 3-point percentage (47.1), blocks (3.1 bpg), and was also second in field goal percentage (58.1)." Mitchell had numerous 30-point, 15-rebound games during the season and became the first freshman since Kansas State's Michael Beasley in 2007–08 to record multiple 30/15 games. For his standout season, he was named a finalist for the Lou Henson Award, an annual college basketball award given to the nation's best mid-major player.

=== Sophomore season ===
Heading into his sophomore season in 2012–13, national media had their eyes on Mitchell as a potential All-American. He had been a projected first-round draft pick in the 2012 NBA draft following his freshman season, but opted to remain at North Texas because he said he "still needed to mature on and off the court." Some of the preseason watchlists and honors that Mitchell received included being an All-American according to numerous media outlets; a John Wooden Award Preseason Top 50 player; being featured on the October cover of Basketball Times; Lindy's number two ranked center in college basketball; and CBS Sports' number seven overall player in the country. He was listed as a "near guarantee" to be named the 2013 Sun Belt Player of the Year according to CBS Sports. An anonymous Sun Belt coach said of Mitchell: "[He] is the most athletic guy in college basketball, bar none. Rebounds as good as anyone. He's a freak."

Mitchell's per-game averages lowered in four of the five major statistical categories from his freshman season: 13.0 points (down from 14.7), 8.5 rebounds (down from 10.3), 0.8 assists (down from 1.6), and 2.7 blocks (down from 3.0). Only his steals per game average increased, going from 0.9 as a freshman to 1.0 in his second year. Additionally, the North Texas squad managed just a 12–20 overall record (7–13 in conference) after being selected as the preseason Sun Belt Conference champions. Midway through the season, Bleacher Report wrote an article which questioned Mitchell's ability to lead a team, noting that a player of his caliber should have been a bigger factor in games played in a mid-major conference. The article also said that his All-American candidacy took a severe blow, and that his per game averages would be more impressive if he played for a stronger Division I program.

== Professional career ==
=== Detroit Pistons (2013–2014) ===
With a college postseason invitation not occurring, Mitchell decided to be the first underclassman to declare for the 2013 NBA draft. He was the first North Texas player to be drafted in the NBA since the Dallas Mavericks drafted John Horrocks in 1984. Mitchell was drafted by the Detroit Pistons with the 37th overall pick in the draft. He was also the highest North Texas player to be drafted in the NBA, ahead of Kenneth Lyons in 1983 (47th overall). On July 19, 2013, he signed with the Pistons. When the 2013 rookie class convened for its annual photo shoot and filled out its NBA.com Rookie Survey, the class voted Mitchell as the most athletic.

On December 26, 2013, Mitchell was assigned to the Fort Wayne Mad Ants. On January 13, 2014, he was recalled by the Pistons. On January 31, 2014, he was reassigned to the Mad Ants. He was later recalled in February 2014. While not making an appearance for the Pistons in the 2014–15 season, Mitchell was assigned multiple times to the Grand Rapids Drive.

=== Short stint with Phoenix Suns (2014–2015) ===
On December 24, 2014, he was traded to the Phoenix Suns in exchange for Anthony Tolliver. However, he was later waived by the Suns on January 9, 2015, before appearing in a game for them.

=== Atléticos de San Germán (2015) ===
On February 5, 2015, Mitchell signed with Atléticos de San Germán of Puerto Rico for the 2015 BSN season.

=== Cocodrilos de Caracas (2015–2016) ===
On September 25, 2015, Mitchell signed with the Golden State Warriors. However, he was waived by the Warriors on October 12. On December 11, he signed with Cocodrilos de Caracas of the Venezuelan League.

=== Guangxi Rhinos (2016) ===
On July 2, 2016, Mitchell signed with the Guangxi Rhinos of the China NBL.

=== Maccabi Haifa (2016–2017) ===
On August 9, 2016, Mitchell signed with Israeli club Maccabi Haifa for the 2016–17 season. On February 10, 2017, he was released by Maccabi after appearing in 17 games.

=== Star Hotshots (2017) ===
On late February 2017, Mitchell signed with the Star Hotshots of the Philippine Basketball Association as the team's import for the 2017 PBA Commissioner's Cup.

=== Metros de Santiago (2017) ===
On May 24, 2017, Mitchell signed with Metros de Santiago of Dominican Republic for the 2017 LNB season.

=== Hapoel Gilboa Galil (2018) ===
On February 22, 2018, Mitchell returned for a second stint in Israel, signing with Hapoel Gilboa Galil for the rest of the season. However, on March 7, 2018, Mitchell was released by Gilboa Galil before appearing in a game for them.

=== Second stint with Cocodrilos de Caracas (2018) ===
On May 8, 2018, Mitchell was reported to have returned and signed with Cocodrilos de Caracas of the Liga Profesional de Baloncesto (LPB).

=== Fubon Braves (2018–2019) ===
On August 4, 2018, Mitchell was reported to have signed with Al Wasl of the UAE National Basketball League.

=== NLEX Road Warriors (2019) ===
In April 2019, Mitchell signed with the NLEX Road Warriors of the Philippine Basketball Association as the team's import for the 2019 PBA Commissioner's Cup.

=== Leones de Ponce (2020–2021) ===
On September 28, 2020, Mitchell signed with the Leones de Ponce of the Baloncesto Superior Nacional.

=== Macau Black Knights (2026) ===
On February 19, 2026, Mitchell signed with the Macau Black Knights.

== NBA career statistics ==
Legend
GP	Games played	GS	Games started	MPG	Minutes per game
FG%	Field goal percentage	3P%	3-point field goal percentage	FT%	Free throw percentage
RPG	Rebounds per game	APG	Assists per game	SPG	Steals per game
BPG	Blocks per game	PPG	Points per game	**Bold**	Career high

=== Regular season ===
Year	Team	GP	GS	MPG	FG%	3P%	FT%	RPG	APG	SPG	BPG	PPG
2013–14	Detroit	21	0	3.8	.417	1.000	.579	1.2	.1	.3	.2	1.0
Career		21	0	3.8	.417	1.000	.579	1.2	.1	.3	.2	1.0

== Personal life ==
Mitchell was born in Milwaukee, Wisconsin but grew up in Dallas, Texas. His parents are Angie L. Mitchell and Tony L. Mitchell Sr., and he has a younger brother, Antonio and younger sister, Adriana.
