= Dwayne Evans (basketball) =

American basketball player (born 1992)

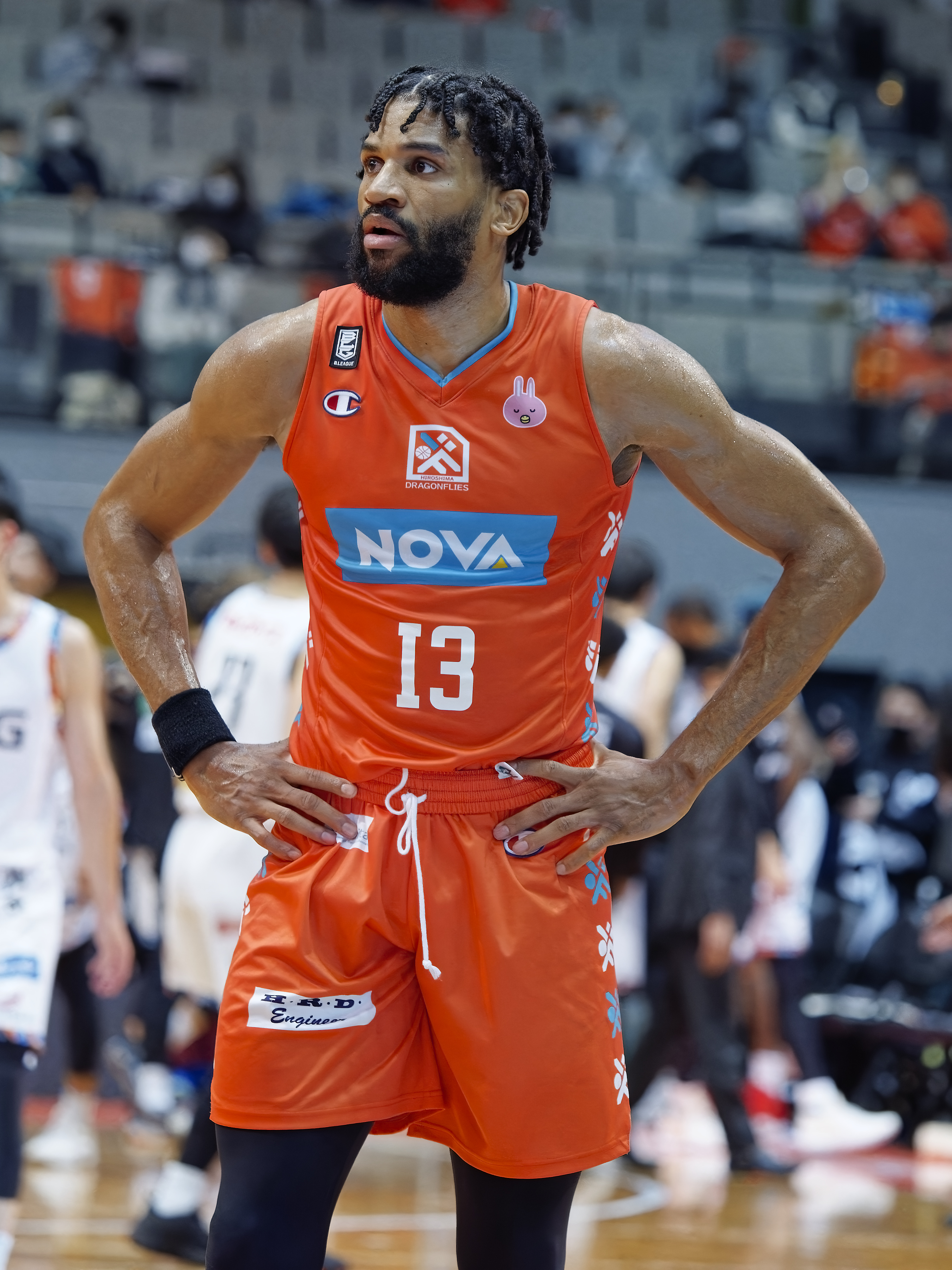
- Evans at Hiroshima Dragonflies in 2023

No. 13 – Hiroshima Dragonflies
- Position: Power forward / small forward
- League: B.League

Personal information
- Born: January 24, 1992 (age 34) Bolingbrook, Illinois, U.S.
- Listed height: 2.01 m (6 ft 7 in)
- Listed weight: 104 kg (229 lb)

Career information
- High school: Neuqua Valley (Naperville, Illinois)
- College: Saint Louis (2010–2014)
- NBA draft: 2014: undrafted
- Playing career: 2015–present

Career history
- 2015–2016: Gladiators Trier
- 2016–2017: Gießen 46ers
- 2017–2018: MHP Riesen Ludwigsburg
- 2018–2019: ratiopharm Ulm
- 2019–2020: Dinamo Sassari
- 2020–2022: Ryukyu Golden Kings
- 2022–present: Hiroshima Dragonflies

Career highlights
- B1 League champion (2024); East Asia Super League champion (2025); East Asia Super League Final Four MVP (2025); 2× First-team All-Atlantic 10 (2013, 2014); Atlantic 10 All-Rookie Team (2011); Atlantic 10 tournament MVP (2013)

Dwayne Evans (born January 24, 1992) is an American basketball player for Hiroshima Dragonflies of the Japanese B.League. He was an All-Atlantic 10 Conference college basketball player at Saint Louis University (SLU).

== College career ==
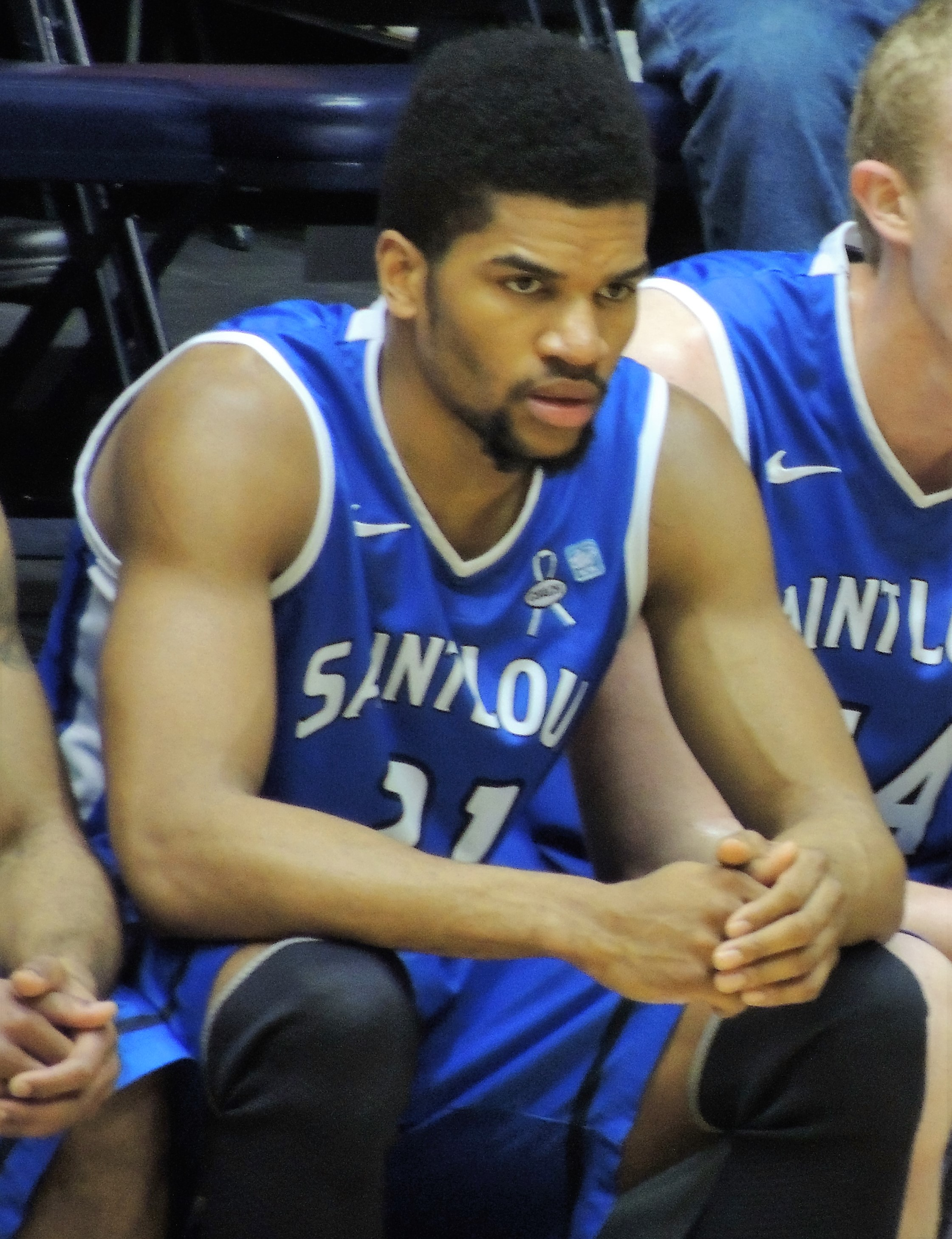
Evans at Saint Louis University in 2013

Evans came to SLU to play for coach Rick Majerus from Neuqua Valley High School in the Chicago suburb of Naperville, Illinois and was an immediate impact player for the Billikens, averaging 8.5 points and 6.5 rebounds per game as a freshman and making the Atlantic 10 Conference All-Rookie team. As a sophomore, Evans made the leap to being a top player in the conference. He then became a first-team All-Atlantic 10 player in both his junior and senior seasons. In addition to conference honors, Evans was named a finalist for the Senior CLASS Award. As a senior, he averaged 14.0 points and 6.5 rebounds per game.

== Professional career ==
Following the close of his college career, Evans was chosen to play in the Reese's college All-Star Game. After going undrafted in the 2014 NBA draft, Evans took a year off from basketball, ultimately signing with Gladiators Trier of the German ProA for the 2015–16 season. After averaging 15.7 points and 8.6 rebounds, he moved up a division to the Basketball Bundesliga with the Gießen 46ers. After averaging 11.8 points and 7.1 rebounds, he signed with MHP Riesen Ludwigsburg for the 2017–18 season.

For the 2018–19 season, Evans signed with ratiopharm Ulm of the Bundesliga and EuroCup. He averaged 12.6 points, 6.2 rebounds and 1.9 assists for ratiopharm Ulm. Evans signed with Dinamo Sassari in Italy on July 23, 2019. He averaged 14.1 points and 7.1 rebounds per game. Evans left the team on June 14, 2020.

On August 25, 2020, Evans signed with Ryukyu Golden Kings of the Japanese B.League. On June 4, 2021, he re-signed with Ryukyu Golden Kings.

On June 9, 2022, Evans signed with Hiroshima Dragonflies of the Japanese B.League. On May 24, 2023, he re-signed with Hiroshima Dragonflies. On June 6, 2024, he re-signed with Hiroshima Dragonflies.

Evans won the East Asia Super League 2024-25 Season championship with the Dragonflies on March 9, 2025, winning the Final Four MVP.
