= Ken Williams (basketball) =

American basketball player

Career information
- College: North Texas (1974–1978)
- NBA draft: 1978: undrafted
- Position: Forward / center

Career highlights
- AP honorable mention All-American (1978); NCAA rebounding leader (1978)

Kenneth Williams is an American retired basketball player who is best known for leading NCAA Division I in rebounding as a senior in 1977–78.

Williams grew up in Dallas, Texas and graduated from South Oak Cliff High School in 1974.

Williams led the Mean Green in rebounding for three seasons, holds the top two single season rebounding totals in school history, and the career record for total rebounds. During his senior season, when he led the NCAA in rebounding, he averaged 14.7 rebounds per game in 28 games.

In 1997, Williams was inducted into the school's athletics hall of fame.
