= Damian Chong Qui =

American basketball player (born 1998)

No. 2 – Macau Giant Pandas
- Position: Point guard
- League: PBA

Personal information
- Born: September 7, 1998 (age 28) Baltimore, Maryland, U.S.
- Listed height: 173 cm (5 ft 8 in)
- Listed weight: 70 kg (154 lb)

Career information
- College: Mount St. Mary's (2018–2021); Purdue Fort Wayne (2021–2023)
- NBA draft: 2023: undrafted
- Playing career: 2024–present

Career history
- 2024–2025: Macau Black Bears
- 2025: Hubei Wenlv
- 2025–2026: Macau Black Bears
- 2026: Hong Kong Eastern
- 2026–present: Macau Black Bears / Black Knights / Giant Pandas
- 2026–present: Macau Hou Chon

Damian Chong Qui (Note: Some sources refer to him as Damian Chong-qui or Chong-Qui) (born September 7, 1998) is an American professional basketball player for the Macau Giant Pandas of the Philippine Basketball Association (PBA).

== Biography ==
Qui was born in Baltimore, Maryland, on September 7, 1998. When Qui was four years old, his mother was murdered. His father was also half-paralyzed after he was shot in 2010.

Qui began his college career at Mount St Mary's University, playing for the Mountaineers. During his freshman year, he played in 31 games, averaging 6.8 points, 3.7 assists, and 2.8 rebounds per game. During his sophomore year, he averaged 12.2 points, 3.9 assists, 3.9 rebounds, and 1.0 steals per game and was named the Northeast Conference Most Improved Player and earned Third Team All-NEC honors. In his junior season, he started all 23 games, averaging 15.1 points, 5.3 assists, and 4.2 rebounds per game. He was named First Team All-NEC and won NEC Player of the Week honors three times. He scored in double figures 19 times, including a career-best 30 points at Central Connecticut.

In the 2021–2022 academic year, Qui transferred to Purdue University Fort Wayne, joining their basketball team. In his first season, he started in 33 games, averaging 10.1 points, 4.0 assists and 2.8 rebounds per game. He scored double digits in 18 games. In his last season, he started in 32 games and averaged 9.3 points, 3.7 assists and 2.8 rebounds per game. During his time at Purdue Fort Wayne, he was recognized for his playmaking and scoring ability, which included a game-winning 3-pointer at the buzzer against Wright State.

After going undrafted in the 2023 NBA draft, Qui signed with the Macau Black Bears of the East Asia Super League (EASL). In the 2024–25 season, he averaged 24.2 points, 9.0 assists and 5.2 rebounds per game. He had a 60.9% field goal percentage, 35.9% three-point percentage, and 86.2% free throw percentage. On November 6, 2024, he became the first player to record a triple-double in the EASL. He was also named the November Player of the Month for this achievement.

== Career statistics ==
Legend
GP	Games played	GS	Games started	MPG	Minutes per game
FG%	Field goal percentage	3P%	3-point field goal percentage	FT%	Free throw percentage
RPG	Rebounds per game	APG	Assists per game	SPG	Steals per game
BPG	Blocks per game	PPG	Points per game	**Bold**	Career high

=== College ===
Year	Team	GP	GS	MPG	FG%	3P%	FT%	RPG	APG	SPG	BPG	PPG
2018–19	Mount St. Mary's	31	24	28.5	.367	.270	.667	2.8	3.7	0.8	0.0	6.8
2019–20	Mount St. Mary's	32	32	34.2	**.409**	.366	**.840**	3.9	3.9	1.0	0.1	12.2
2020-21	Mount St. Mary's	23	23	**36.8**	.375	.336	.804	**4.2**	**5.3**	0.9	0.1	**15.1**
2021–22	Purdue Fort Wayne	**33**	**33**	31.5	.408	**.370**	.757	2.0	3.5	**1.1**	0.1	10.1
2022–23	Purdue Fort Wayne	32	32	29.2	.359	.240	.632	1.7	3.7	0.9	0.0	9.3

Source: and

=== East Asia Super League ===
Year	Team	GP	GS	MPG	FG%	3P%	FT%	RPG	APG	SPG	BPG	PPG
2024–25	Macau Black Bears	6	6	38.5	.609	.359	.862	5.2	9.0	0.7	0.0	24.2
