= Macau Giant Pandas =

Professional basketball team

- League: All-Macau Basketball League; The Asian Tournament; East Asia Super League; PBA (guest)
- Founded: 1989; 37 years ago
- History: List: Nanhai Long-Lions (2017) Nanhai Kung Fu (2017) Chong Son Kung Fu (2017–2018) Macau Black Bears (2018–present) Macau Black Knights (2026–present; international) Macau Giant Pandas (2026–present; PBA)
- Arena: University of Macau Sports Complex; The Venetian Macao
- Location: Macau
- Team colors: Black, green, gold, white
- Team manager: Mark Dandan
- Head coach: Marcus Elliott
- Ownership: Jacque Ruby
Home	Away	Third

Macau Black Bears
- Traditional Chinese: 澳門黑熊
- Simplified Chinese: 澳门黑熊
- Literal meaning: Macau Black Bears
Transcriptions
Standard Mandarin
- Hanyu Pinyin: Àomén Hēi Xióng
Yue: Cantonese
- Jyutping: ou3 mun4*2 hak1 hung4

Alternative Chinese name
- Traditional Chinese: 南海龍獅
- Simplified Chinese: 南海龙狮
Transcriptions
Standard Mandarin
- Hanyu Pinyin: Nánhǎi Lóng Shī
Yue: Cantonese
- Jyutping: naam4 hoi2 lung4 si1

Nanhai Kung Fu
- Chinese: 南海功夫
Transcriptions
Standard Mandarin
- Hanyu Pinyin: Nánhǎi Gōng Fū
Yue: Cantonese
- Jyutping: naam4 hoi2 gung1 fu1

Chong Son Kung Fu
- Chinese: 忠信功夫
Transcriptions
Standard Mandarin
- Hanyu Pinyin: Zhōng Xìn Gōng Fū
Yue: Cantonese
- Jyutping: zung1 seon3 gung1 fu1

The Macau Black Bears, also known as the Macau Black Knights and the Macau Giant Pandas (PBA-only), are a Macanese professional basketball team.

Originally based in mainland China, they played under a different name when debuting at the ASEAN Basketball League in 2017. In 2018, they moved to Macau, becoming the Macau Black Bears, and kept on playing in regular seasons of the ABL until 2020. They debuted at the East Asia Super League as representatives of the city in its 2024–25 season. They entered the Philippine Basketball Association, playing as a guest team in the 2026 Commissioner's Cup, and the 2026 Governors' Cup.

== History ==
=== Chong Son Kung Fu ===
Macau Black Bears was originally a basketball team based in mainland China which played in the ASEAN Basketball League (ABL). The team was based in Nanhai District, Foshan, Guangdong and played their home games at the 4,000-seated Nanhai Gymnasium. They joined the ABL from 2017–18 season as Nanhai Long Lions, the affiliate team of Guangzhou Loong Lions. They changed their name to Nanhai Kung Fu to differentiate from their mother team. After they partnered with Macau's Grupo Desportivo Chong Son, they changed the name once again, to Chong Son Kung Fu Basketball Club by November 2017.

=== Macau Black Bears ===
After the 2017–18 ABL season, the team relocated to Macau to become the Macau Black Bears, in a bid to promote professional basketball in the city. The inaugural season was led by the general manager Lukas Peng.

They reached the playoffs in their first season (2018–19) representing Macau. The next iteration of the ABL, the 2019–20 season, was disrupted by the COVID-19 pandemic, but the team remained active via the 3x3 basketball format, competing in the 3×3 Super League and the Wynn Cup 3X3 Greater Bay Area Tour in China.

The Macau Black Bears got promoted from the junior to the senior category of the Macao Silver Medal Basketball Tournament in 2019. In 2023, the Black Bears began taking part in The Asian Tournament. It also joined the 2023 ABL Invitational. They won their first senior title in the All-Macau Basketball League in February 2024. This was followed by the Macao Silver Medal Tournament defeating Fukien in the senior final in May 2024. They joined East Asia Super League, starting with the 2024–25 season.

=== PBA entry ===
On 6 February 2026, it was announced that they will join the Philippine Basketball Association (PBA) as a guest team in the upcoming PBA Comissioner's Cup, and change their name to the Macau Black Knights after Star Entertainment invested in the team. Special player eligibility rules were imposed for the purpose of their PBA participation. Players from Greater China are considered as "locals", while they can have two imports and only one can play at a time. They cannot have Filipinos in the roster. They plan to be a permanent member in the PBA. On March 25, the team have announced that they would replace Garrett Kelly as their head coach, after bringing in former player Marcus Elliott.

The Macau Black Knights was granted the permission to take part at the 2026 PBA Governors' Cup as a guest team. Ahead of the conference start in July, Macau changed their branding again, to the Macau Giant Pandas for the PBA. However due to the team's poor performance, the PBA decided to stop extending an invitation to the team.

=== Continued Macau domestic participation ===
Locally, they compete in the Macao Silver Medal Basketball Tournament as of 2026, as the Macau Black Bears.

== Team image ==
The team is part of the Macau Black Bears Sports Club, dating back to 2018. The earlier logo features Bobo the Black Bear, an individual asian black bear who came to public attention in the 1980s when it was rescued from being cooked in a gourmet restaurant as a cub. In early 2026, the team changed their branding to the Macau Black Knights, with the bear given a knight's armor. The team retained the name Black Bears for domestic tournaments.

For the purpose of their participation in the PBA, the team adopted the name Black Pandas in June 2026, to promote the city's giant pandas.

== Current roster ==
=== PBA ===
Macau Giant Pandas roster
Players
Coaches

Pos.	#	POB	Name	Height	Weight	DOB (YYYY–MM–DD)	From
G	0	(Macau)	Chao Xingzhao	1.86 m (6 ft 1 in)
G	1	(China)	Zhu Zhaojing	1.86 m (6 ft 1 in)
G	2	(United States)	Damian Chong Qui	1.72 m (5 ft 8 in)	70 kg (154 lb)	28 – 9 July 1998	Purdue; Fort Waybe
F/C	3	(Australia)	Ramon Cao	2.03 m (6 ft 8 in)		28 – 4 November 1997	Florida College
G	5	(United States)	Phoenix Shackelford	1.92 m (6 ft 4 in)	91 kg (201 lb)	27 – 19 April 1999	Cal Poly
G	7	(Canada)	Jenning Leung	1.83 m (6 ft 0 in)	82 kg (181 lb)	31 – 17 July 1995	McGill
F	14	(United States)	Tony Mitchell (CI)	2.01 m (6 ft 7 in)	107 kg (236 lb)	34 – 7 April 1992	North Texas
F	19	(China)	Liu Wenke	1.86 m (6 ft 1 in)
F	24	(China)	Li Jiashuo	2.00 m (6 ft 7 in)
F	25	(China)	Sun Meng	2.00 m (6 ft 7 in)
F	26	(China)	Li Xiaoxu	2.00 m (6 ft 7 in)
F/C	28	(China)	Lu Zijie	2.05 m (6 ft 9 in)	105 kg (231 lb)	27 – 3 March 1999
F	29	(China)	Wang Yingran	2.00 m (6 ft 7 in)
F	32	(United States)	Oscar Lopez (CI)	1.93 m (6 ft 4 in)		29 – 1 January 1997	Central Michigan
F	48	(Macau)	Lao Chon Pong	1.93 m (6 ft 4 in)	86 kg (190 lb)	30 – 1 December 1995	Macau Polytechnic Institute
G	77	(Chinese Taipei)	Chen Li-hsing	1.75 m (5 ft 9 in)	68 kg (150 lb)	24 – 16 September 2002	National Taiwan Sport University
G	88	(China)	Gao Yufeng	1.86 m (6 ft 1 in)

Head coach

- (United States) Marcus Elliott

Assistant coach(es)

- (Philippines) Rich Alvarez
- (Philippines) Brian Ilad
- (Philippines) Tylon Darjuan
- (Philippines) Monbert Arong
- (Philippines) Macky Acosta
- (Philippines) Raymond Tiongco (consultant)

Team manager

- (Philippines) Fredrick Damdan
- (Philippines) Jomari Lacastesantos

Legend

- (C) Team captain
- (CI) Commissioner's Cup Import
- (GI) Governors' Cup Import
- (EI) EASL Import
- (DP) Unsigned draft pick
- (FA) Free agent
- (IN) Inactive
- (S) Suspended
- (R) Rookie
- Injured

Roster
Last transaction: 25 March 2026

=== EASL ===
Note: Flags indicate national team eligibility at FIBA-sanctioned events. Players may hold other non-FIBA nationalities not displayed.

Macau Black Bears roster
Players
Coaches

Pos.	No.	Nat.	Name	Ht.	Wt.	DOB (YYYY-MM-DD)	From
F	1	(United States)	Omari Peek-Green	1.98 m (6 ft 6 in)	95 kg (209 lb)	26 – 19 April 2000	Delaware State
PG	2	(United States)	Damian Chongqui	1.72 m (5 ft 8 in)	70 kg (154 lb)	28 – 9 July 1998	Purdue Fort Wayne
SG	5	(China)	Liu Weiyi	1.88 m (6 ft 2 in)	77 kg (170 lb)	21 – 16 December 2004
F	6	(United States)	Torrence Watson	1.96 m (6 ft 5 in)	95 kg (209 lb)	26 – 8 November 1999
PG	7	(China)	Ye Runfeng	1.80 m (5 ft 11 in)	68 kg (150 lb)	22 – 18 August 2004	Huaqiao University
G	10	(United States)	Phoenix Shackelford	1.92 m (6 ft 4 in)	91 kg (201 lb)	27 – 19 April 1999	Cal Poly
SG	13	(China)	Xu Siyang	1.92 m (6 ft 4 in)	87 kg (192 lb)	20 – 1 March 2006
PF	15	(United States)	Jalon Demarco Miller	2.06 m (6 ft 9 in)	108 kg (238 lb)	30 – 12 January 1996	TCU
C	21	(China)	Guo Yuchen	2.05 m (6 ft 9 in)	108 kg (238 lb)	22 – 9 April 2004	Huaqiao University
SF	33	(China)	Cao Guoliang	1.98 m (6 ft 6 in)	80 kg (176 lb)	22 – 17 August 2004
SF	48	(Macau)	Lao Chon Pong	1.93 m (6 ft 4 in)	86 kg (190 lb)	30 – 1 December 1995	Macau Polytechnic Institute

Head coach

- (United States) Garrett Kelly

Assistant coach(es)

- (United States) Zeshaun Mirza
- (Macau) Zhang Jingang
- (Chinese Taipei) Yang Zhi-kuan

General manager

- (Canada) Lukas Peng

Scout

- (Canada) Kin Chan

Legend

- (C) Team captain
- (WI) World import
- Injured

== Head coaches ==
- (Canada) Charles Dubé-Brais (2017–2018, 2022–2023)
- (China) Mu Jianxin (2018–2019)
- (Canada) Charles Hantoumakos (2019–2020)
- (United States) Kevin Connelly (2023–2025)
- (United States) Garrett Kelly (2024–2026)
- (China) Zhou Lu Nan (2025–2026)
- (United States) Marcus Elliott (2026–present)
- (Philippines) Mark Dandan (TAT) (2026–present)

== Season-by-season record ==
Season	League	Team name	Regular season				Post season			
Season	League	Team name	Won	Lost	Win %	Finish	Won	Lost	Win %	Result
2017–18	ASEAN Basketball League	Chong Son Kung Fu	15	5	.750	1st	0	2	.000	Lost in semi-finals to Mono Vampire
2018–19	ASEAN Basketball League	Macau Black Bears	14	12	.538	6th	1	2	.333	Lost in quarter-finals to Singapore Slingers
2019–20	ASEAN Basketball League	Macau Black Bears	7	7	.500	6th	Cancelled due to COVID-19 pandemic in Asia			
2023	ASEAN Basketball League	Macau Black Bears	7	7	.500	5th	Did not qualify			
2024–25	East Asia Super League	Macau Black Bears	3	3	.500	3rd in Group B	Did not qualify			
2025–26	East Asia Super League	Macau Black Bears	0	6	.000	4th in Group B	Did not qualify			
2025–26 (Commissioner's)	Philippine Basketball Association	Macau Black Knights	3	9	.250	11th	Did not qualify			
2025–26 (Governors')	Philippine Basketball Association	Macau Giant Pandas	2	10	.167	6th in Group A	Did not qualify			

== Affiliates ==
- Guangzhou Loong Lions
