= D. J. Kennedy =

American basketball player (born 1989)

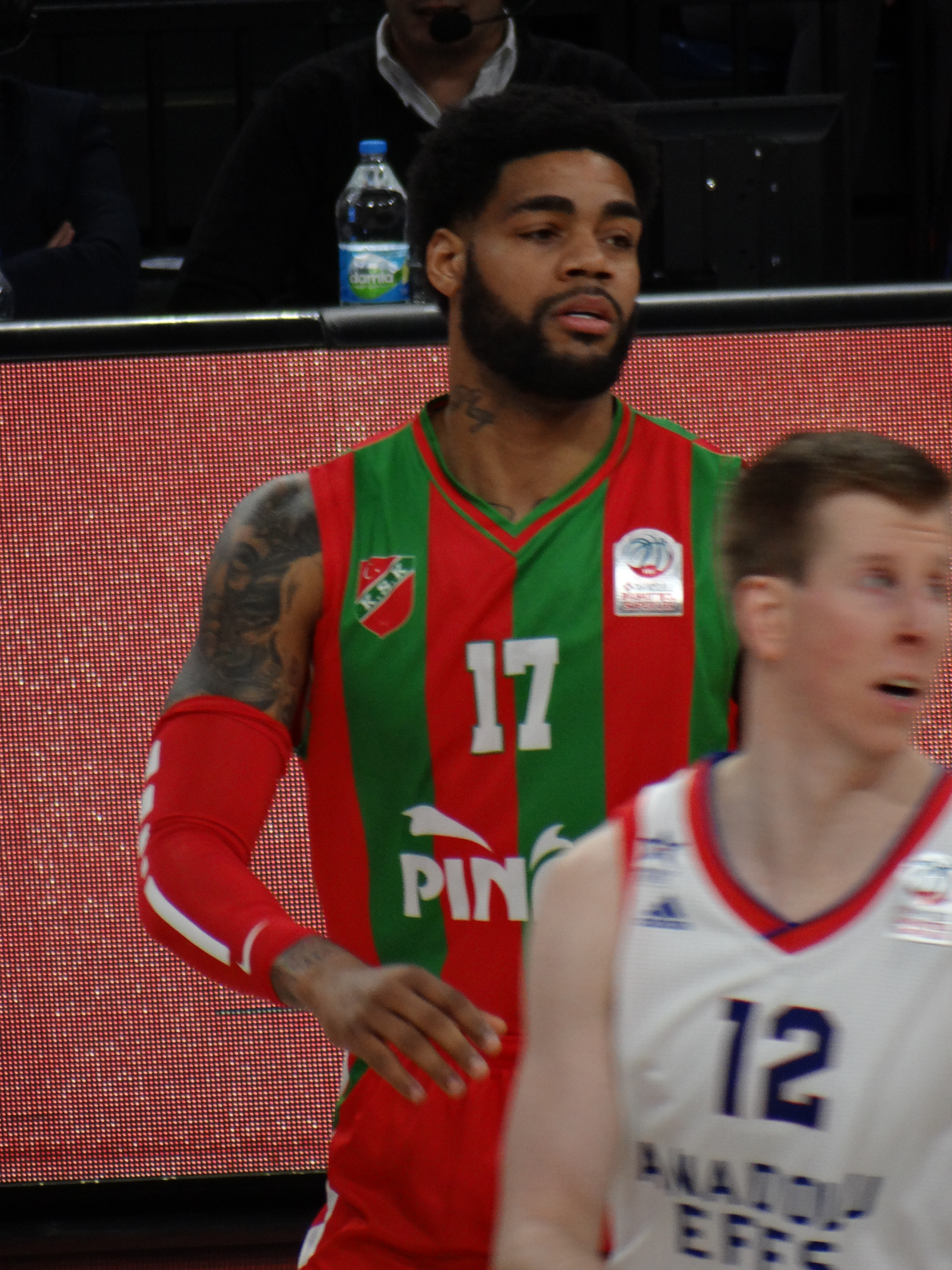
- Kennedy with Pınar Karşıyaka in 2018

No. 23 – Trotamundos de Carabobo
- Position: Small forward / shooting guard
- League: Superliga Profesional de Baloncesto

Personal information
- Born: November 5, 1989 (age 36) Pittsburgh, Pennsylvania, U.S.
- Listed height: 6 ft 6 in (1.98 m)
- Listed weight: 215 lb (98 kg)

Career information
- High school: Schenley (Pittsburgh, Pennsylvania)
- College: St. John's (2007–2011)
- NBA draft: 2011: undrafted
- Playing career: 2011–present

Career history
- 2011–2012: Erie BayHawks
- 2012: Cleveland Cavaliers
- 2012–2013: Erie BayHawks
- 2013: Rio Grande Valley Vipers
- 2013: BCM Gravelines-Dunkerque
- 2014: Hapoel Holon
- 2014: Krasny Oktyabr
- 2014–2015: Riesen Ludwigsburg
- 2015–2016: Enisey
- 2016–2017: Guangzhou Long-Lions
- 2017: Riesen Ludwigsburg
- 2017–2018: Pınar Karşıyaka
- 2018–2019: Melbourne United
- 2019: Reyer Venezia
- 2019–2021: Pınar Karşıyaka
- 2021–2022: Prometey Kamianske
- 2022: Hapoel Galil Elyon
- 2022–2024: Prometey
- 2024: Hapoel Galil Elyon
- 2024–2025: Meralco Bolts
- 2025: Homenetmen Beirut
- 2025–2026: Hapoel Galil Elyon
- 2026–present: Trotamundos de Carabobo

Career highlights
- BIBL champion (2022); Italian League champion (2019); BCL rebounding leader (2018); BCL Star Lineup Best Team (2018); FIBA Europe Cup Starting Five (2016); All-BBL First Team (2015); BBL Best Offensive Player (2015); BBL scoring champion (2015); NBA D-League champion (2013); NBA D-League All-Star (2013); All-NBA D-League Third Team (2013)
- Stats at NBA.com
- Stats at Basketball Reference

David John Kennedy (born November 5, 1989) is an American professional basketball player for the Trotamundos de Carabobo of the Superliga Profesional de Baloncesto (SPB). He played college basketball for St. John's University.

== High school career ==
Kennedy attended Schenley High School in Pittsburgh, Pennsylvania. As a senior in 2006–07, he averaged 17.7 points, 7.5 rebounds, 4.5 assists and 2.0 blocks per game. In helping the Spartans to a 29–3 record and the 2007 PIAA AAAA State championship, he earned a first team all-state selection, a first team all-city selection and a two-time Pittsburgh Post-Gazette "Fabulous Five" selection.

== College career ==
In his freshman season at St. John's, Kennedy finished second on the squad with 37 steals, including 20 in BIG EAST play. In 30 games (29 starts), he averaged 7.8 points, 5.8 rebounds, 1.4 assists and 1.2 steals per game.

In his sophomore season, he was one of only two Red Storm players to start and play in each of the squad's 34 games. In those 34 games, he averaged 13.0 points, 6.6 rebounds, 3.0 assists and 1.5 steals in 34.6 minutes per game.

In his junior season, he earned a first team All-Met selection by the Metropolitan Basketball Writers Association (MBWA). In 33 games (31 starts), he averaged 15.1 points, 6.1 rebounds, 3.1 assists and 1.2 steals in 31.4 minutes per game.

In his senior season, he scored a total of 333 points to finish his college career at St. John's as the school's 12 all-time leading scorer with 1,504 total points, as well as finish 11th all-time in rebounds (781) and sixth all-time in steals (183). In 32 games, he averaged 10.4 points, 5.6 rebounds, 2.0 assists and 1.8 steals in 28.7 minutes per game.

== Professional career ==
=== 2011–12 season ===
Kennedy went undrafted in the 2011 NBA draft. In November 2011, he was acquired by the Erie BayHawks.

On April 21, 2012, he signed with the Cleveland Cavaliers for the rest of the 2011–12 season.

=== 2012–13 season ===
In July 2012, Kennedy joined the Cleveland Cavaliers for the 2012 NBA Summer League. On July 25, 2012, he was traded to the Memphis Grizzlies. On September 18, 2012, he was waived by the Grizzlies. Later that month, he re-signed with the Grizzlies. On October 7, 2012, he was again waived by the Grizzlies. On November 1, 2012, he was re-acquired by the Erie BayHawks.

On February 4, 2013, Kennedy was named to the Prospects All-Star roster for the 2013 NBA D-League All-Star Game.

On March 5, 2013, Kennedy was traded to the Rio Grande Valley Vipers. He went on to win the 2013 NBA D-League championship with the Vipers.

=== 2013–14 season ===
In July 2013, Kennedy joined the Miami Heat for the 2013 NBA Summer League. On September 10, 2013, he signed with the Dallas Mavericks. However, he was later waived by the Mavericks on October 22, 2013.

On October 27, 2013, he signed with BCM Gravelines of France for the 2013–14 season. On December 3, 2013, he parted ways with Gravelines after just 8 games. On January 4, 2014, he signed with Hapoel Holon of Israel for the rest of the season.

=== 2014–15 season ===
In July 2014, Kennedy joined the Minnesota Timberwolves for the 2014 NBA Summer League. On September 1, 2014, he signed with Krasny Oktyabr of Russia for the 2014–15 season. On November 18, 2014, he left the club after appearing in just six games. On December 6, 2014, he signed with MHP Riesen Ludwigsburg of Germany for the rest of the season.

=== 2015–16 season ===
In July 2015, Kennedy joined the Houston Rockets for the 2015 NBA Summer League. On August 10, 2015, he signed with Yenisey Krasnoyarsk of Russia for the 2015–16 season. In 40 games and 38 starts, he averaged 14.9 points, 7.4 rebounds and 3.7 assists per game.

=== 2016–17 season ===
On September 15, 2016, Kennedy signed with the Denver Nuggets, but was waived on October 15 after appearing in one preseason game. On November 14, he signed with Guangzhou Long-Lions of China. Four days later, he made his debut in an 89–88 loss to Qingdao DoubleStar, recording 24 points, 12 rebounds, five assists, one steal and one block.

On March 16, 2017, Kennedy returned to his former club MHP Riesen Ludwigsburg for the rest of the 2016–17 BBL season.

=== 2017–18 season ===
On August 11, 2017, Kennedy signed with Turkish club Pınar Karşıyaka for the 2017–18 season. He was the leading scorer of the 2017–18 Basketball Champions League season, with 19 points per game. Karşıyaka was eliminated in the quarter-finals of the Champions League and finished tenth in the Turkish Basketbol Süper Ligi.

=== 2018–19 season ===
On September 9, 2018, Kennedy signed with Melbourne United for the 2018–19 NBL season. In March 2019, following the conclusion of the NBL season, he signed with Reyer Venezia of the Lega Basket Serie A.

=== 2019–20 season ===
On September 25, 2019, he has signed with his former club Pınar Karşıyaka for 3+6 months deal, as an injury cover for Tony Crocker. Kennedy averaged 9.9 points and 6.2 rebounds per game.

=== 2020–21 season ===
On July 20, 2020, Kennedy signed a two-year extension with Pınar Karşıyaka. He averaged 7.8 points, 5.2 rebounds, and 2.2 assists per game.

=== 2021–22 season ===
On September 24, 2021, Kennedy signed with Prometey Kamianske of the Ukrainian Basketball SuperLeague.

On March 9, 2022, he has signed with Hapoel Galil Elyon of the Israeli Premier League.

=== 2022–23 season ===
On July 28, 2022, he has signed with Prometey of the Latvian-Estonian Basketball League.

== The Basketball Tournament ==
Kennedy joined the inaugural Overseas Elite roster for The Basketball Tournament (TBT)—a single-elimination winner-take-all tournament—during the summer of 2015. Overseas Elite defeated Team 23 in the TBT 2015 championship game, 67–65, to claim the $1 million prize. Kennedy scored 24 points in the game, and was subsequently named MVP. Overseas Elite and Kennedy repeated as champions in TBT 2016 with a 77–72 victory over Team Colorado, earning them that year's $2 million prize, with Kennedy named to the All-Tournament Team.

Kennedy and his team became three-time champions with an 86–83 win over Team Challenge ALS in TBT 2017, bringing their total winnings to $5 million. Kennedy averaged 15 points, 6.5 rebounds and 3.2 assists per game and was again named to the All-Tournament Team. On August 3, 2018, Kennedy and Overseas Elite won TBT 2018, securing their fourth consecutive championship and another $2 million prize, with Kennedy being named MVP and a member of the All-Tournament Team. In TBT 2019, Kennedy and Overseas Elite advanced to the semifinals where they suffered their first-ever defeat, losing to eventual champions Carmen's Crew, 71–66. Kennedy was again named to the All-Tournament Team. Kennedy did not play for Overseas Elite during TBT 2020; the team lost in the semifinals.

For TBT 2021, with Overseas Elite not entering the tournament, Kennedy joined Boeheim's Army, a team rostered primarily with Syracuse Orange men's basketball alumni. Boeheim's Army captured the championship and $1 million prize.

TBT Summary
Year	Team	Team result	Kennedy honors	Ref.
2015	Overseas Elite	Champions	MVP†	
2016	Overseas Elite	Champions	All-Tournament	
2017	Overseas Elite	Champions	All-Tournament	
2018	Overseas Elite	Champions	All-Tournament & MVP	
2019	Overseas Elite	Lost in semifinals	All-Tournament	

† In 2015, only a tournament MVP was named.

== Career statistics ==
Legend
GP	Games played	GS	Games started	MPG	Minutes per game
FG%	Field goal percentage	3P%	3-point field goal percentage	FT%	Free throw percentage
RPG	Rebounds per game	APG	Assists per game	SPG	Steals per game
BPG	Blocks per game	PPG	Points per game	**Bold**	Career high

=== NBA ===
==== Regular season ====
Year	Team	GP	GS	MPG	FG%	3P%	FT%	RPG	APG	SPG	BPG	PPG
2011–12	Cleveland	2	0	29.5	.417	.500	.000	3.5	1.5	1.0	.0	6.0
Career		2	0	29.5	.417	.500	.000	3.5	1.5	1.0	.0	6.0

Led the league

=== Basketball Champions League ===
Year	Team	GP	MPG	FG%	3P%	FT%	RPG	APG	SPG	BPG	PPG
2017–18	Karsiyaka	18	34.8	.541	.344	.743	8.4	3.2	1.8	0.5	19.0

== Personal ==
Kennedy is the son of Rana Holliday and David "Puff" Kennedy. His father was a standout college basketball player at Cincinnati. He has one brother, Derrick Holliday, and one sister, Chanae Holliday.
