= Kenneth Lyons =

American basketball player (born 1960)

Personal information
- Born: September 2, 1960 (age 66) Fort Worth, Texas, U.S.
- Listed height: 6 ft 7 in (2.01 m)
- Listed weight: 210 lb (95 kg)

Career information
- High school: Trimble Tech (Fort Worth, Texas)
- College: North Texas (1979–1983)
- NBA draft: 1983: 2nd round, 47th overall pick
- Drafted by: Philadelphia 76ers
- Position: Power forward

Career history
- 1983–1984: Lancaster Lightning
- Stats at Basketball Reference

Kenneth R. Lyons (born September 2, 1960) is a retired American basketball player who is best known for his collegiate career at North Texas State University (now known as the University of North Texas) between 1979–80 and 1982–83. Standing at 6 ft 7 in (2.01 m) and weighing 210 pounds (95 kg), Lyons played power forward

During Lyons' four year NCAA Division I career he compiled 2,291 points and 1,020 rebounds, joining an exclusive list of Division I men's basketball players to achieve both of those milestones. Through 2009–10 he is the highest scorer in UNT history. Lyons averaged 20.6 points and 9.2 rebounds per game for his career, and as a senior was named the Southland Conference men's basketball tournament co-MVP with Lamar's Lamont Robinson. The Philadelphia 76ers selected Lyons in the second round (47th pick overall) in the 1983 NBA draft, but he never played a game in the league. He played briefly for the Lancaster Lightning of the Continental Basketball Association CBA in the 1983–84 season, 6.2 points in five games.

In 1993, North Texas enshrined him in their school's athletics hall of fame.

== See also ==
- List of NCAA Division I men's basketball players with 2000 points and 1000 rebounds
