= Tony Worrell =

American basketball player

Personal information
- Born: December 29, 1965 Goldsboro, North Carolina, U.S.
- Died: November 10, 2015 (aged 49) Grand Junction, Colorado, U.S.
- Listed height: 6 ft 7 in (2.01 m)

Career information
- High school: Goldsboro (Goldsboro, North Carolina)
- College: North Texas (1984–1988)
- NBA draft: 1988: undrafted
- Position: Small forward

Career history
- 1990–1992: Commodore
- 1996–1997: Independiente General Pico

Career highlights
- Southland Player of the Year (1988); 2× First-team All-Southland (1987, 1988)

Tony Worrell (December 29, 1965 – November 10, 2015) was an American professional basketball player. He played college basketball for the North Texas Mean Green.

== Early life ==
Worrell was born in Goldsboro, North Carolina, and attended Goldsboro High School. Worrell garnered recruiting attention after playing well in All-Star camps the summer before his senior year and was named to the North Carolina East-West All-Star game. Ultimately, he was scouted by 150 colleges and committed to play for the North Texas Mean Green.

== College career ==
Worrell scored 1,516 points during his Mean Green career and is ranked 8th in program scoring history. He led the team to its first NCAA tournament appearance in 1988 behind his 20.2 points per game during the season. He clinched the Mean Green's NCAA bid by scoring 33 points in the 1988 Southland tournament, earning MVP honors. Worrell scored a team-high 15 points in their loss to the North Carolina Tar Heels. He was named the Southland Conference Men's Basketball Player of the Year in 1988 and became the first African-American student-athlete at the University of North Texas to earn the award. Worrell was a two-time selection to the All-Southland first-team.

Worrell was inducted into the North Texas Athletics Hall of Fame in 2000. He was named to the 1980s all-decade Southland Conference team in 2013.

== Professional career ==
Following the close of his college career, Worrell went undrafted in the 1988 NBA draft. He joined the Dallas Mavericks for the NBA Summer League, where he impressed coaches but ultimately did not make the final roster. Worrell was also selected by the Rapid City Thrillers as the 50th overall pick in the 1988 Continental Basketball Association draft. He played professional basketball for 11 years in Spain, Switzerland, Belgium, France and Argentina. Worrell played for Commodore in the Netherlands from 1990 to 1992.

== Later life and death ==
Worrell moved to Grand Junction, Colorado, with his family in 2001. He coached youth basketball and officiated games.

Worrell died on November 10, 2015, in Grand Junction.
