= Philippines women's national basketball team results =

This is a list of the Philippines women's national basketball team results. This list includes non-competitive matches against foreign teams.

== By year ==
=== 2026 ===
Date	Opponent	Result	Score	Venue	Competition
17 August	Mexico	L	58–61	Arena Astros, Guadalajara, Mexico	2028 FIBA Women's PQT
19 August	Canada	L	38–85	Arena Astros, Guadalajara, Mexico	2028 FIBA Women's PQT
20 August	Senegal	W	79–75	Arena Astros, Guadalajara, Mexico	2028 FIBA Women's PQT
17 September	Kazakhstan	W	86–58	Aichi International Arena, Nagoya, Japan	Asian Games
20 September	Hong Kong	W	90–73	Aichi International Arena, Nagoya, Japan	Asian Games
22 September	Japan	L	67–89	Aichi International Arena, Nagoya, Japan	Asian Games
24 September	Chinese Taipei	L	71–83	Aichi International Arena, Nagoya, Japan	Asian Games

=== 2025 ===
Date	Opponent	Result	Score	Venue	Competition
2 July	Chinese Taipei Blue	L	59–85	Taipei Heping Basketball Gymnasium, Taipei, Taiwan	William Jones Cup
3 July	Thailand	W	83–66	Taipei Heping Basketball Gymnasium, Taipei, Taiwan	William Jones Cup
4 July	South Korea	L	58–80	Taipei Heping Basketball Gymnasium, Taipei, Taiwan	William Jones Cup
6 July	Japan Universiade	L	74–94	Taipei Heping Basketball Gymnasium, Taipei, Taiwan	William Jones Cup
7 July	WUG CTUSF Training	L	57–76	Taipei Heping Basketball Gymnasium, Taipei, Taiwan	William Jones Cup
13 July	Australia	L	39–115	Shenzhen Bay Sports Center, Shenzhen, China	FIBA Women's Asia Cup
14 July	Japan	L	82–85	Shenzhen Bay Sports Center, Shenzhen, China	FIBA Women's Asia Cup
16 July	Lebanon	W	73–70	Shenzhen Bay Sports Center, Shenzhen, China	FIBA Women's Asia Cup
18 July	New Zealand	L	71–78	Shenzhen Bay Sports Center, Shenzhen, China	FIBA Women's Asia Cup

=== 2024 ===
Date	Opponent	Result	Score	Venue	Competition
6 July	Chinese Taipei White	L	60–73	Xinzhuang Gymnasium, New Taipei City, Taiwan	William Jones Cup
7 July	Malaysia	W	74–63	Xinzhuang Gymnasium, New Taipei City, Taiwan	William Jones Cup
8 July	Japan Universiade	L	83–85	Xinzhuang Gymnasium, New Taipei City, Taiwan	William Jones Cup
9 July	Thailand	W	68–58	Xinzhuang Gymnasium, New Taipei City, Taiwan	William Jones Cup
10 July	Chinese Taipei Blue	L	66–82	Xinzhuang Gymnasium, New Taipei City, Taiwan	William Jones Cup
19 August	Brazil	L	74–77	BK Arena, Kigali, Rwanda	2026 FIBA Women's Basketball World Cup PQT
20 August	Hungary	L	60–97	BK Arena, Kigali, Rwanda	2026 FIBA Women's Basketball World Cup PQT
22 August	Senegal	L	62–87	BK Arena, Kigali, Rwanda	2026 FIBA Women's Basketball World Cup PQT

=== 2023 ===
Date	Opponent	Result	Score	Venue	Competition
10 May	Cambodia	W	114–54	Morodok Techo Indoor Sports Center, Phnom Penh, Cambodia	SEA Games
11 May	Singapore	W	94–63	Morodok Techo Indoor Sports Center, Phnom Penh, Cambodia	SEA Games
12 May	Indonesia	L	68–89	Morodok Techo Indoor Sports Center, Phnom Penh, Cambodia	SEA Games
13 May	Vietnam	W	116–58	Morodok Techo Indoor Sports Center, Phnom Penh, Cambodia	SEA Games
14 May	Thailand	W	82–70	Morodok Techo Indoor Sports Center, Phnom Penh, Cambodia	SEA Games
15 May	Malaysia	W	77–63	Morodok Techo Indoor Sports Center, Phnom Penh, Cambodia	SEA Games
26 June	Australia	L	34–105	State Sports Centre, Sydney, Australia	FIBA Women's Asia Cup Division A - Group B
27 June	Japan	L	57–95	State Sports Centre, Sydney, Australia	FIBA Women's Asia Cup Division A - Group B
28 June	Chinese Taipei	W	92–81	State Sports Centre, Sydney, Australia	FIBA Women's Asia Cup Division A - Group B
30 June	New Zealand	L	78–83	State Sports Centre, Sydney, Australia	FIBA Women's Asia Cup Division A - QF
1 June	South Korea	L	71–80	State Sports Centre, Sydney, Australia	FIBA Women's Asia Cup Division A - 5th Place Game
5 August	Chinese Taipei White	L	85–89	Taipei Heping Basketball Gymnasium, Taipei, Taiwan	William Jones Cup
6 August	Iran	W	64–58	Taipei Heping Basketball Gymnasium, Taipei, Taiwan	William Jones Cup
7 August	Chinese Taipei Blue	L	83–94	Taipei Heping Basketball Gymnasium, Taipei, Taiwan	William Jones Cup
8 August	(South Korea) Busan BNK Sum	L	59–65	Taipei Heping Basketball Gymnasium, Taipei, Taiwan	William Jones Cup
9 August	(Japan) Chanson V-Magic	L	88–95	Taipei Heping Basketball Gymnasium, Taipei, Taiwan	William Jones Cup

=== 2022 ===
Date	Opponent	Result	Score	Venue	Competition
16 May	Indonesia	W	93–77	Thanh Trì District Sporting Hall, Hanoi, Vietnam	2021 SEA Games
18 May	Thailand	W	97–81	Thanh Trì District Sporting Hall, Hanoi, Vietnam	2021 SEA Games
19 May	Vietnam	W	118–87	Thanh Trì District Sporting Hall, Hanoi, Vietnam	2021 SEA Games
21 May	Singapore	W	90–61	Thanh Trì District Sporting Hall, Hanoi, Vietnam	2021 SEA Games
22 May	Malaysia	L	93–96	Thanh Trì District Sporting Hall, Hanoi, Vietnam	2021 SEA Games

=== 2021 ===
Date	Opponent	Result	Score	Venue	Competition
27 September	China	L	52–143	Prince Hamza Hall, Amman, Jordan	FIBA Women's Asia Cup Division A - Group B
28 September	Australia	L	56–120	Prince Hamza Hall, Amman, Jordan	FIBA Women's Asia Cup Division A - Group B
29 September	Chinese Taipei	L	52–93	Prince Hamza Hall, Amman, Jordan	FIBA Women's Asia Cup Division A - Group B
30 September	India	W	74–70	Prince Hamza Hall, Amman, Jordan	FIBA Women's Asia Cup Division A - 7th Place Game

=== 2019 ===
Date	Opponent	Result	Score	Venue	Competition
29 April	(Hungary) TFSE	W	82–78	Aero Center, Quezon City, Philippines	Exhibition game
23 June	Guam	W	94–61	Philippines	Exhibition game
24 July	New Zealand	L	72–106	Changhua County Gymnasium, Changhua County, Taiwan	William Jones Cup
25 July	(Japan) Mitsubishi Electric Koalas	L	82–85	Changhua County Gymnasium, Changhua County, Taiwan	William Jones Cup
26 July	Chinese Taipei Blue	L	91–99 (OT)	Changhua County Gymnasium, Changhua County, Taiwan	William Jones Cup
27 July	(South Korea) Korea National Bank KB Stars	L	80–92	Changhua County Gymnasium, Changhua County, Taiwan	William Jones Cup
28 July	Chinese Taipei White	L	83–92	Changhua County Gymnasium, Changhua County, Taiwan	William Jones Cup
24 September	Australia	L	57–123	Kanteerava Indoor Stadium, Bangalore, India	FIBA Women's Asia Cup Division A - Group B
25 September	China	L	57–104	Kanteerava Indoor Stadium, Bangalore, India	FIBA Women's Asia Cup Division A - Group B
26 September	New Zealand	L	57–75	Kanteerava Indoor Stadium, Bangalore, India	FIBA Women's Asia Cup Division A - Group B
27 September	India	W	92–78	Kanteerava Indoor Stadium, Bangalore, India	FIBA Women's Asia Cup Division A - 7th Place Game
14 November	New Zealand	L	54–111	The Trusts Arena, Auckland, New Zealand	FIBA Women's Olympic Pre-Qualifying Asian Tournament
16 November	South Korea	L	75–114	The Trusts Arena, Auckland, New Zealand	FIBA Women's Olympic Pre-Qualifying Asian Tournament
17 November	China	L	49–127	The Trusts Arena, Auckland, New Zealand	FIBA Women's Olympic Pre-Qualifying Asian Tournament
05 December	Indonesia	W	63–56	Mall of Asia Arena, Pasay, Philippines	SEA Games
08 December	Malaysia	W	81–75	Mall of Asia Arena, Pasay, Philippines	SEA Games
10 December	Thailand	W	91–71	Mall of Asia Arena, Pasay, Philippines	SEA Games

=== 2017 ===
Date	Opponent	Result	Score	Venue	Competition
23 July	Japan	L	55–106	Kanteerava Indoor Stadium, Bangalore, India	FIBA Women's Asia Cup Division A - Group B
24 July	Australia	L	65–107	Kanteerava Indoor Stadium, Bangalore, India	2017 FIBA Women's Asia CupFIBA Women's Asia Cup Division A - Group B
25 July	South Korea	L	63–91	Kanteerava Indoor Stadium, Bangalore, India	FIBA Women's Asia Cup Division A - Group B
27 July	China	L	43–117	Kanteerava Indoor Stadium, Bangalore, India	FIBA Women's Asia Cup Division A - QF
28 July	Chinese Taipei	L	53–87	Kanteerava Indoor Stadium, Bangalore, India	FIBA Women's Asia Cup Division A - 5th–8th
29 July	North Korea	W	78–63	Kanteerava Indoor Stadium, Bangalore, India	FIBA Women's Asia Cup Division A - 7th Place Game
20 August	Singapore	W	88–54	MABA Stadium, Kuala Lumpur, Malaysia	SEA Games
21 August	Indonesia	L	68–78	MABA Stadium, Kuala Lumpur, Malaysia	SEA Games
22 August	Myanmar	W	123–33	MABA Stadium, Kuala Lumpur, Malaysia	SEA Games
23 August	Thailand	W	69–67	MABA Stadium, Kuala Lumpur, Malaysia	SEA Games
24 August	Malaysia	L	56–60	MABA Stadium, Kuala Lumpur, Malaysia	SEA Games
25 August	Vietnam	W	118–44	MABA Stadium, Kuala Lumpur, Malaysia	SEA Games
