= List of 2024–25 TPBL season transactions =

This is a list of transactions that have taken place during the 2024 TPBL off-season and the 2024–25 TPBL season.

== Front office movements ==
=== Head coaching changes ===
Off-season

Departure date	Team	Outgoing head coach	Reason for departure	Hire date	Incoming head coach	Last coaching position	Ref.
May 23	Kaohsiung Aquas	Brendan Joyce	Left the team	July 10	Mathias Fischer	Osaka Evessa head coach (2022–2024)	
August 28	Taipei Taishin Mars	Hsu Hao-Cheng (interim)	Interim	August 28	Hsu Hao-Cheng	Taipei Mars interim head coach (2024)	

In-season

Departure date	Team	Outgoing head coach	Reason for departure	Hire date	Incoming head coach	Last coaching position	Ref.
December 6	Hsinchu Toplus Lioneers	Milan Mitrovic	Contract terminated	December 6	Seng Hsin-Han (interim)	Hsinchu JKO Lioneers / Hsinchu Toplus Lioneers assistant coach (2020–2024)	
December 17	Hsinchu Toplus Lioneers	Seng Hsin-Han (interim)	Interim	December 17	Wesam Al-Sous	Jordan men's national basketball team head coach (2021–2025)	

== Player movements ==
=== Trades ===
July
July 8	To Formosa Dreamers: Cash considerations	To Taiwan Beer Leopards: Ting Kuang-Hao
July 20	To Formosa Dreamers: Cash considerations	To Taoyuan Taiwan Beer Leopards: Yang Shen-Yen; 2024 Dreamers' first-round pick
December
December 2	To New Taipei CTBC DEA: Lin Meng-Hsueh	To Taoyuan Taiwan Beer Leopards: Cash considerations

=== Free agents ===
Player	Date signed	New team	Former team	Ref.
Su Wen-Ju	June 16	Kaohsiung Aquas		
Lu Wei-Ting	June 17	Kaohsiung Aquas		
Hu Long-Mao	June 19	Kaohsiung Aquas		
Chiang Yu-An	July 2	Formosa Dreamers	Taiwan Beer Leopards (T1 League)	
Su Shih-Hsuan	July 2	New Taipei Kings		
Lee Chi-Wei	July 3	Hsinchu Toplus Lioneers	Taiwan Beer Leopards (T1 League)	
Chen Jen-Jei	July 4	Formosa Dreamers		
Wu Chia-Chun	July 4	Formosa Dreamers		
Lee Te-Wei	July 4	Formosa Dreamers		
Lu Kuan-Liang	July 4	Formosa Dreamers		
Lu Chi-Erh	July 5	Taiwan Beer Leopards	Tainan TSG GhostHawks (T1 League)	
Chen Kuan-Chuan	July 5	Taipei Mars	Kaohsiung 17LIVE Steelers (P. League+)	
Li Han-Sheng	July 10	Hsinchu Toplus Lioneers	Tainan TSG GhostHawks (T1 League)	
Chang Tsung-Hsien	July 12	Formosa Dreamers	Taipei Fubon Braves (P. League+)	
Su Yi-Chin	July 12	Taipei Taishin Mars	Tainan TSG GhostHawks (T1 League)	
Tseng Po-Yu	July 12	Hsinchu Toplus Lioneers		
Lu Cheng-Ju	July 15	New Taipei Kings	Kaohsiung 17LIVE Steelers (P. League+)	
Wei Chia-Hao	July 16	New Taipei CTBC DEA		
Chien Wei-Ju	July 17	Formosa Dreamers	Tainan TSG GhostHawks (T1 League)	
Lee Kai-Yan	July 18	New Taipei Kings		
Shih Chin-Yao	July 18	New Taipei CTBC DEA	Kaohsiung 17LIVE Steelers (P. League+)	
Chris Johnson	July 24	New Taipei Kings	Taipei Fubon Braves (P. League+)	
James Eads	July 25	New Taipei CTBC DEA	Szolnoki Olajbányász (Hungary)	
Anthony Morse	July 26	Kaohsiung Aquas	Esenler Erokspor (Turkey)	
Austin Daye	July 29	New Taipei Kings		
Kaleb Wesson	July 29	Kaohsiung Aquas	Élan Chalon (France)	
Wang Hao-Chi	July 31	Taoyuan Taiwan Beer Leopards	Taiwan Beer (Super Basketball League)	
Tung Yung-Chuan	July 31	Taoyuan Taiwan Beer Leopards	Taiwan Beer (Super Basketball League)	
Kenneth Chien (HP)	July 31	Taipei Taishin Mars	Formosa Dreamers (P. League+)	
Jason Washburn	August 1	New Taipei Kings	Taoyuan Pauian Pilots (P. League+)	
Chevez Goodwin	August 1	New Taipei CTBC DEA	Rostock Seawolves (Germany)	
Wang Lu-Hsiang	August 1	Taipei Taishin Mars	Kaohsiung 17LIVE Steelers (P. League+)	
Brandon Gilbeck	August 2	Formosa Dreamers		
Terrence Bieshaar	August 2	Kaohsiung Aquas	Landstede Hammers (Netherlands)	
Li Ruei-Ci	August 2	New Taipei CTBC DEA	Kaohsiung 17LIVE Steelers (P. League+)	
Devin Oliver	August 3	Taipei Taishin Mars	Yokohama B-Corsairs (Japan)	
Kenny Manigault	August 5	New Taipei Kings		
Bryan Griffin	August 6	New Taipei CTBC DEA	CSM Constanța (Romania)	
Lasan Kromah	August 9	Taoyuan Taiwan Beer Leopards		
Devin Williams	August 9	Taoyuan Taiwan Beer Leopards		
Ma Chien-Hao	August 9	Formosa Dreamers	Jiangsu Dragons (China)	
Kristijan Krajina	August 10	New Taipei CTBC DEA		
Matej Radunič	August 12	Hsinchu Toplus Lioneers	Herons Basket Montecatini (Italy)	
Raynere Thornton	August 14	New Taipei CTBC DEA	VfL SparkassenStars Bochum (Germany)	
Aric Holman	August 14	Formosa Dreamers	Al-Nasr (Libya)	
Larry Sanders	August 19	Taoyuan Taiwan Beer Leopards	Ball Hogs (United States)	
Jonah Morrison	August 20	New Taipei CTBC DEA		
Michael Holyfield	August 21	Hsinchu Toplus Lioneers		
Huang Jhen	August 21	Taoyuan Taiwan Beer Leopards		
Liu Yuan-Kai	August 21	Taoyuan Taiwan Beer Leopards		
Michael Efevberha	August 22	Hsinchu Toplus Lioneers		
Stefan Janković	August 23	Formosa Dreamers (Testing player contract)	Vancouver Bandits (Canada)	
Emondre Rickman	August 23	Formosa Dreamers (Testing player contract)	Tachikawa Dice (Japan)	
Ihor Zaytsev	August 26	Taipei Taishin Mars	Taipei Fubon Braves (P. League+)	
Byron Mullens	August 30	Taipei Taishin Mars	Winnipeg Sea Bears (Canada)	
Robert Upshaw	August 31	Taoyuan Taiwan Beer Leopards	Seattle Super Hawks (United States)	
Jeremy Lin (HP)	September 2	New Taipei Kings		
Malcolm Miller	September 7	Taipei Taishin Mars	Unione Cestistica Casalpusterlengo (Italy)	
Beau Beech	September 10	Formosa Dreamers	BC Enisey (Russia)	
Earl Clark	September 13	Hsinchu Toplus Lioneers	Trilogy (United States)	
Hsu Yu-Hui	September 25	New Taipei CTBC DEA	NTSU (Undrafted in 2024)	
Lin Meng-Hsueh	September 26	Taoyuan Taiwan Beer Leopards	Taipei Fubon Braves (P. League+)	
Chen Chun-Han	September 27	Taoyuan Taiwan Beer Leopards	Bank of Taiwan (Super Basketball League)	
Derek King (HP)	September 30	Taoyuan Taiwan Beer Leopards	VantaBlack Dragons (Hong Kong)	
Kennedy Meeks	October 1	Hsinchu Toplus Lioneers	Taoyuan Pauian Pilots (P. League+)	
Sani Sakakini (AI)	October 9	New Taipei Kings	Al Riyadi Club Beirut (Lebanon)	
Conner Frankamp	November 4	New Taipei CTBC DEA	Palencia Baloncesto (Spain)	
Ray McCallum	November 8	Taipei Taishin Mars	ASK Karditsas B.C. (Greece)	
Micheal Eric	November 8	Taipei Taishin Mars	Al Ahli Tripoli (Libya)	
A.J. Pacher	November 18	Formosa Dreamers	Riesen Ludwigsburg (Germany)	
Lu Zong-Lin	November 27	Taoyuan Taiwan Beer Leopards	Taiwan Beer (Super Basketball League)	
Thomas Robinson	November 30	Taipei Taishin Mars	Astros de Jalisco (Mexico)	
Edgaras Želionis	December 3	Kaohsiung Aquas	El Calor de Cancún (Mexico)	
Mitchell Smith	December 6	Taoyuan Taiwan Beer Leopards	ASK Karditsas B.C. (Greece)	
Julian Gamble	December 10	Hsinchu Toplus Lioneers	Lobos Plateados de la BUAP (Mexico)	
Tevin Mack	December 12	New Taipei CTBC DEA	Al Ahli Tripoli (Libya)	
Nysier Brooks	December 17	New Taipei CTBC DEA	BC Samara (Russia)	
Egidijus Mockevičius	December 21	Taoyuan Taiwan Beer Leopards	El Calor de Cancún (Mexico)	
Rahlir Hollis-Jefferson	December 23	Taipei Taishin Mars	Taipei Mars (T1 League)	
Dar Tucker	December 23	Hsinchu Toplus Lioneers	Mineros de Zacatecas (Mexico)	
Anthony Bennett	December 24	Formosa Dreamers	Kaohsiung 17LIVE Steelers (P. League+)	
Craig Sword	January 1	Kaohsiung Aquas	Tasmania JackJumpers (Australia)	
Landers Nolley	January 15	Hsinchu Toplus Lioneers	Aris Midea (Greece)	
Earnest Ross	January 21	Taoyuan Taiwan Beer Leopards	SG Apes (Mongolia)	
Adrien Moerman	January 22	Taipei Taishin Mars	Zenit Saint Petersburg (Russia)	
Ivan Aska	January 24	New Taipei CTBC DEA	Urunday Universitario (Uruguay)	
Arnett Moultrie	February 7	Kaohsiung Aquas	Taipei Fubon Braves (P. League+)	
Daron Russell	February 25	New Taipei CTBC DEA	Karşıyaka Basket (Turkey)	
Marko Todorović	February 25	New Taipei CTBC DEA	UCAM Murcia (Spain)	
Nate Laszewski	February 28	Hsinchu Toplus Lioneers	Aris Midea (Greece)	
Jeantal Cylla	March 20	Taipei Taishin Mars	Selenge Bodons (Mongolia)	
Axel Toupane	March 22	Taoyuan Taiwan Beer Leopards	Homenetmen Beirut (Lebanon)	
Markus Lončar	March 25	Formosa Dreamers	CS Antonine (Lebanon)	
Lin Yao-Tsung			Formosa Dreamers	
Chai Chen-Hao			New Taipei Kings	
Hsu Ching-En			Taipei Mars	
Deyonta Davis			Hsinchu Toplus Lioneers	
Ihor Zaytsev			Taipei Taishin Mars (Waived on November 19)	

=== Going to other Taiwanese leagues ===
Player	Date signed	New team	New league	Former team	Ref.
DeMarcus Cousins	June 19	Taiwan Mustangs	The Asian Tournament	Taiwan Beer Leopards	
Liu Yen-Ting	July 25	Kaohsiung 17LIVE Steelers	P. League+	Taipei Mars	
Wang Yung-Cheng	August 1	Bank of Taiwan	Super Basketball League	Kaohsiung Aquas	
Li Wei-Ting	August 2	Kaohsiung 17LIVE Steelers	P. League+	New Taipei Kings	
Chen Hsiao-Jung	August 12	Taiwan Beer	Super Basketball League	Taiwan Beer Leopards	
Cheng Wei	August 12	Taiwan Beer	Super Basketball League	Taiwan Beer Leopards	
Lu Chieh-Min	August 12	Taiwan Beer	Super Basketball League	Taiwan Beer Leopards	
Lin Li	August 16	Changhua BLL	Super Basketball League	Taipei Mars	
Chu I-Tsung	August 22	Taiwan Beer	Super Basketball League	Taiwan Beer Leopards	
Wu Pei-Chia	August 22	Taiwan Beer	Super Basketball League	Taiwan Beer Leopards	
Julian Boyd	August 28	Taoyuan Pauian Pilots	P. League+	Formosa Dreamers	
Chen Yu-An	September 16	Kaohsiung 17LIVE Steelers	P. League+	New Taipei CTBC DEA	
Joof Alasan	December 11	Taiwan Beer	Super Basketball League	Taoyuan Taiwan Beer Leopards (Waived on December 11)	
Lu Zong-Lin	December 11	Taiwan Beer	Super Basketball League	Taoyuan Taiwan Beer Leopards (Waived on December 11)	
Yang Shen-Yen	December 11	Changhua BLL	Super Basketball League	Taoyuan Taiwan Beer Leopards (Out on loan)	
Liu Kuang-Shang	December 26	Yulon	Super Basketball League	Hsinchu Toplus Lioneers (Waived on August 26)	
Michael Efevberha	February 7	New Taipei Kings	Basketball Champions League Asia	Hsinchu Toplus Lioneers (Waived on October 8)	
Chris Johnson	April 3	New Taipei Kings	Basketball Champions League Asia	New Taipei Kings	

=== Going overseas ===
Player	Date signed	New team	New country	Former team	Ref.
Perry Jones	May 26	Spartans Distrito Capital	Venezuela	Kaohsiung Aquas	
Edgaras Želionis	May 27	Marinos B.B.C.	Venezuela	New Taipei CTBC DEA	
Chris McCullough	May 28	Strong Group Athletics	Philippines	Formosa Dreamers	
Jaylen Johnson	May 28	Bivouac	United States	Taipei Mars	
Earl Clark	May 28	Trilogy	United States	Hsinchu Toplus Lioneers	
Youssou Ndoye	June 9	Shijiazhuang Xianglan	China	Taipei Mars	
Mohammad Al Bachir Gadiaga	June 17	Akita Northern Happinets	Japan	New Taipei CTBC DEA	
Mindaugas Kupšas	June 26	Hefei Storm	China	Kaohsiung Aquas	
DeAndre Williams	July 25	Sabah BC	Azerbaijan	Taiwan Beer Leopards	
Aaron Geramipoor	August 8	Soles de Mexicali	Mexico	Kaohsiung Aquas	
Lin Ping-Sheng	August 31	Zhejiang Lions	China	Taipei Mars	
Devyn Marble	September 3	Porto	Portugal	Formosa Dreamers	
Cody Demps	October 14	Elitzur Briga Netanya	Israel	New Taipei CTBC DEA	
Emondre Rickman	October 17	Ovarense Basquetebol	Portugal	Formosa Dreamers	
Sun Szu-Yao	November 20	Kanazawa Samuraiz	Japan	Taipei Taishin Mars (Waived on November 20)	
Matej Radunič	November 21	Virtus Roma	Italy	Hsinchu Toplus Lioneers (Waived on November 21)	
Byron Mullens	November 25	BCH Knights	Mongolia	Taipei Taishin Mars (Waived on November 5)	
Devin Oliver	November 29	SLUC Nancy Basket	France	Taipei Taishin Mars (Waived on November 27)	
Vladyslav Koreniuk	December 5	Nanjing Monkey Kings	China	Taipei Mars	
Chevez Goodwin	December 6	Força Lleida	Spain	New Taipei CTBC DEA (Waived on November 4)	
Wendell Lewis	December 10	Satria Muda Pertamina	Indonesia	New Taipei Kings	
Bryan Griffin	January 6	Changwon LG Sakers	South Korea	New Taipei CTBC DEA (Waived on January 7)	
Jason Brickman	January 8	Strong Group Athletics	Philippines	Kaohsiung Aquas (Waived on December 18)	
James Eads	January 14	Sabah BC	Azerbaijan	New Taipei CTBC DEA (Waived on December 12)	
Dragan Zeković	January 15	Club Malvín	Uruguay	New Taipei CTBC DEA	
Terrence Bieshaar	January 15	Heroes Den Bosch	Netherlands	Kaohsiung Aquas (Waived on December 31)	
Conner Frankamp	January 22	Dinamo București	Romania	New Taipei CTBC DEA (Waived on January 17)	
Mitchell Smith	January 29	Balkan Botevgrad	Bulgaria	Taoyuan Taiwan Beer Leopards (Waived on January 13)	
Julian Gamble	February 5	Raleigh Firebirds	United States	Hsinchu Toplus Lioneers (Waived on January 3)	
Larry Sanders	February 21	Club Sameji	Dominican Republic	Taoyuan Taiwan Beer Leopards (Waived on October 30)	
Thomas Robinson	March 7	Paisas Basketball	Colombia	Taipei Taishin Mars (Waived on January 21)	
Tevin Mack	March 11	Al-Ittihad Jeddah	Saudi Arabia	New Taipei CTBC DEA (Waived on January 24)	
Michael Holyfield	March 15	Maccabi Ra'anana	Israel	Hsinchu Toplus Lioneers (Waived on March 13)	
Robert Upshaw	March 31	Salem Capitals	United States	Taoyuan Taiwan Beer Leopards (Waived on December 19)	
Earnest Ross	April 3	Sunshine Coast Phoenix	Australia	Taoyuan Taiwan Beer Leopards (Waived on March 21)	
Raynere Thornton	April 9	Argentino de Junín	Argentina	New Taipei CTBC DEA (Waived on December 30)	
Stefan Janković	April 16	Calgary Surge	Canada	Formosa Dreamers (Waived on November 16)	
Anthony Bennett	April 28	Al-Najma	Bahrain	Formosa Dreamers (Waived on March 26)	

=== Waived ===
Player	Date waived	Former team	Ref.
Shih Yen-Tsung	August 19	Hsinchu Toplus Lioneers (Permanent ban by CTBA)	
Liu Kuang-Shang	August 26	Hsinchu Toplus Lioneers	
Michael Efevberha	October 8	Hsinchu Toplus Lioneers	
Derek King	October 28	Taoyuan Taiwan Beer Leopards (3-year suspension by Taiwan)	
Larry Sanders	October 30	Taoyuan Taiwan Beer Leopards	
Chevez Goodwin	November 4	New Taipei CTBC DEA	
Byron Mullens	November 5	Taipei Taishin Mars	
Stefan Janković	November 16	Formosa Dreamers	
Ihor Zaytsev	November 19	Taipei Taishin Mars	
Sun Szu-Yao	November 20	Taipei Taishin Mars	
Matej Radunič	November 21	Hsinchu Toplus Lioneers	
Jonah Morrison	November 21	New Taipei CTBC DEA (Indefinite suspension but reinstated by TPBL)	
Devin Oliver	November 27	Taipei Taishin Mars	
Joof Alasan	December 11	Taoyuan Taiwan Beer Leopards	
Lu Zong-Lin	December 11	Taoyuan Taiwan Beer Leopards	
James Eads	December 12	New Taipei CTBC DEA	
Jason Brickman	December 18	Kaohsiung Aquas	
Robert Upshaw	December 19	Taoyuan Taiwan Beer Leopards	
Raynere Thornton	December 30	New Taipei CTBC DEA	
Terrence Bieshaar	December 31	Kaohsiung Aquas	
Julian Gamble	January 3	Hsinchu Toplus Lioneers	
Bryan Griffin	January 7	New Taipei CTBC DEA	
Mitchell Smith	January 13	Taoyuan Taiwan Beer Leopards	
Conner Frankamp	January 17	New Taipei CTBC DEA	
Thomas Robinson	January 21	Taipei Taishin Mars	
Tevin Mack	January 24	New Taipei CTBC DEA	
Dar Tucker	February 12	Hsinchu Toplus Lioneers	
Michael Holyfield	March 13	Hsinchu Toplus Lioneers	
Rahlir Hollis-Jefferson	March 16	Taipei Taishin Mars	
A.J. Pacher	March 18	Formosa Dreamers	
Earnest Ross	March 21	Taoyuan Taiwan Beer Leopards	
Marko Todorović	March 25	New Taipei CTBC DEA	
Anthony Bennett	March 26	Formosa Dreamers	
Arnett Moultrie	April 3	Kaohsiung Aquas	

(HP): Heritage players
(AI): Asian import players

== Draft ==
The 2024 TPBL draft was held on July 23, 2024, at Grand Hilai Taipei in Taipei City. 33 players participated in the draft, and 11 players were chosen in three rounds.

Pick	Player	Date signed	Team	Ref.
1	Samuel Manu	July 25	Taipei Taishin Mars	
2	Tsai Cheng-Kang	July 30	Hsinchu Toplus Lioneers	
3	Wang Jhe-Yu	August 7	Taoyuan Taiwan Beer Leopards (rights acquired from Dreamers)	
4	Wei Liang-Che	July 31	Kaohsiung Aquas	
5	Yu Wei-Hao	August 12	New Taipei CTBC DEA	
6	Chiang Chun	August 2	Taipei Taishin Mars (rights acquired from Leopards)	
7	Chen Chiang-Shuang	—N/a	New Taipei Kings	
8	Shih Cheng-Ping	July 30	Formosa Dreamers	
9	Chuang Po-Yuan	August 7	Taoyuan Taiwan Beer Leopards	
10	Chen Kuan-Chung	—N/a	New Taipei CTBC DEA	
11	Tseng Ming-Wei	—N/a	New Taipei CTBC DEA	

== See also ==
- 2024–25 Formosa Dreamers season
- 2024–25 Hsinchu Toplus Lioneers season
- 2024–25 Kaohsiung Aquas season
- 2024–25 New Taipei CTBC DEA season
- 2024–25 New Taipei Kings season
- 2024–25 Taipei Taishin Mars season
- 2024–25 Taoyuan Taiwan Beer Leopards season
