= 2026 William Jones Cup =

International basketball tournament

Tournament information
- Location: New Taipei City, Taiwan
- Dates: M: 14–23 August 2026; W: 26–29 August 2026
- Host: Taiwan
- Venue: Xinzhuang Gymnasium
- Teams: M: 8 W: 6
- Website: jonescup.meetagile.com

Final positions
- Champions: M: (South Korea) Wonju DB Promy (1st title, 3rd title for country); W: Japan (2nd title, 7th title for country)
- 1st runners-up: M: (United States) UC Irvine Anteaters; W: Rep. of China Blue
- 2nd runners-up: M: Rep. of China Blue; W: Lebanon
- MVP: M: Rayshaun Hammonds (Wonju DB Promy); W: Miyu Okamoto (Japan)

The 2026 William Jones Cup was the 45th staging of the William Jones Cup, an annual international basketball tournament held in Taiwan organized by the Chinese Taipei Baseball Association (CTBA).

The men's tournament took place from 14 to 23 August 2026, followed by the women's tournament from 26 to 29 August 2026. All games were played at the Xinzhuang Gymnasium in New Taipei City.

Two-time defending champion Strong Group Athletics of the Philippines failed to reach the knockout round despite placing second in the group stage, due to a controversial rule that grants the host team Republic of China (Chinese Taipei) Blue an assured semi-final berth regardless of their group stage result. Korean Basketball League club Wonju DB Promy won the men's tournament by defeating American college team UC Irvine Anteaters 98–78 in the final. Meanwhile, the women's tournament was won by Japan, after defeating Republic of China (Chinese Taipei) Blue 75–66 in the final.

== Format ==
=== Men's tournament ===
For the men's tournament, the 2026 William Jones Cup deviated from the traditional format of hosting a single round-robin for all participating teams. Instead, it was confirmed on 5 August 2026 that the eight participating teams will be divided into two groups in a double round-robin format, with a rest day after the third matchday (halfway into the round-robin). The top-two teams from each group will supposedly advance to the semi-finals. However, the host team Republic of China (Chinese Taipei) Blue in Group A was assured of a semi-final berth regardless of its final group standing. The Chinese Taipei Baseball Association (CTBA) explained that the guaranteed semi-final berth will "enhance the entertainment value" by ensuring Taiwanese fans can watch their team play in the semi-finals. The CTBA reasoned that their core players "needed to rest and recover" between the FIBA World Cup qualifiers in July and the 2026 Asian Games in September, forcing them to use a lineup of less-experienced players. The invited teams reportedly only knew about this clause upon their arrival in Taiwan.

On the final match day of the group stage on 20 August, the CTBA issued an apology with the injury-stricken Blue team at the bottom of the table while Strong Group Athletics (SGA) of the Philippines on the brink of elimination despite being second in the standings pending their final game. The CTBA has conceded that SGA were the "biggest victim" of the controversial format. The CTBA pledged to "review and improve the tournament format and scheduling for next year."

On the same day, CTBA vice chairman Wen Ta-pei contradicted the narrative that SGA only learned about the format mid-tournament. He said that if SGA head coach Charles Tiu was truly unaware of the format, the responsibility lay with the coach rather than the association. The following day, the CTBA released a statement detailing its account of the timeline for disseminating the rules, stating that it had conveyed the rules to FIBA on 29 July, which included the assured semi-final berth for the host Blue team of Group A. It added that only Wonju DB Promy expressed a formal objection. Sports minister Lee Yang urged the CTBA not to undermine Taiwan's credibility in international competitions in response to the tournament's controversial format favoring the hosts.

=== Women's tournament ===
The women's tournament had the six participating teams allocated into two groups. However, unlike the men's equivalent, only a single round-robin was played. The teams that topped their groups then qualified for the final, while the runners-up of each group played the third-place game; the teams that finished at the bottom of their groups then played the fifth-place game.

== Men's tournament ==
=== Participating teams ===
Team	Country	Notes
Japan		National team
Jordan		National team
Malaysia		National team
(Philippines) Strong Group Athletics	Philippines	Non-league club
Republic of China Blue	Taiwan (Chinese Taipei)	National team; hosts
Republic of China White	Taiwan (Chinese Taipei)	National developmental team; hosts
(South Korea) Wonju DB Promy	South Korea	Club team (KBL)
(United States) UC Irvine Anteaters	United States	Collegiate team (NCAA Division I)

=== Group stage ===
==== Group A ====
Pos	Team	Pld	W	L	PF	PA	PD	PCT	Qualification
1	(South Korea) Wonju DB Promy	6	5	1	523	461	+62	.833 (Note: Wonju DB Promy 197–192 Strong Group Athletics)	Semifinals
2	(Philippines) Strong Group Athletics	6	5	1	591	507	+84	.833	Fifth place game
3	Japan	6	1	5	441	480	−39	.167 (Note: Japan 156–132 Republic of China Blue)	Seventh place game
4	Republic of China Blue (H)	6	1	5	426	533	−107	.167	Semifinals (Note: Host teams Republic of China automatically qualify to the semi-finals regardless of their group stage result.)

Source: William Jones Cup
(H) Hosts
Notes:

14 August
13:00

Report

Strong Group Athletics (Philippines)	79–110	(South Korea) Wonju DB Promy
Scoring by quarter: 15−28, 21−28, 19−27, 24−27
Pts: Agee 21; Rebs: Agee 10; Asts: Wright 8		Pts: Hammonds 25; Rebs: Hammonds 14; Asts: 3 players 5

Xinzhuang Gymnasium, New Taipei City

14 August
19:30

Report

Japan	66–70	Republic of China Blue
Scoring by quarter: 8−23, 17−12, 24−17, 17−18
		Pts: Sung 24; Rebs: Gilbeck 10; Asts: Gilbeck 4

Xinzhuang Gymnasium, New Taipei City

15 August
15:00

Report

Japan	72–78	(Philippines) Strong Group Athletics
Scoring by quarter: 21−21, 17−15, 22−19, 12−23
		Pts: Piñeiro 21; Rebs: Piñeiro 11; Asts: Miller 4

Xinzhuang Gymnasium, New Taipei City

15 August
19:00

Report

Republic of China Blue	66–76	(South Korea) Wonju DB Promy
Scoring by quarter: 23−24, 10−19, 18−16, 15−17
Pts: Gilbeck 18; Rebs: Gilbeck 8 Asts: Chou 5		Pts: Hammonds 26; Rebs: Hammonds 13; Asts: Alvano 7

Xinzhuang Gymnasium, New Taipei City

16 August
15:00

Report

Wonju DB Promy (South Korea)	88–63	Japan
Scoring by quarter: −, −, −, −

Xinzhuang Gymnasium, New Taipei City

16 August
19:00

Report

Strong Group Athletics (Philippines)	97–78	Republic of China Blue

Xinzhuang Gymnasium, New Taipei City

18 August
15:00

Report

Strong Group Athletics (Philippines)	107–86	Japan

Xinzhuang Gymnasium, New Taipei City

18 August
19:00

Report

Wonju DB Promy (South Korea)	87–76	Republic of China Blue

Xinzhuang Gymnasium, New Taipei City

19 August
15:00

Report

Strong Group Athletics (Philippines)	113–87	(South Korea) Wonju DB Promy

Xinzhuang Gymnasium, New Taipei City

19 August
19:00

Report

Republic of China Blue	62–90	Japan

Xinzhuang Gymnasium, New Taipei City

20 August
15:00

Report

Japan	64–75	(South Korea) Wonju DB Promy

Xinzhuang Gymnasium, New Taipei City

20 August
19:00

Report

Republic of China Blue	74–117	(Philippines) Strong Group Athletics

Xinzhuang Gymnasium, New Taipei City

==== Group B ====
Pos	Team	Pld	W	L	PF	PA	PD	PCT	Qualification
1	(United States) UC Irvine Anteaters	6	6	0	501	356	+145	1.000	Semifinals
2	Republic of China White (H)	6	3	3	443	472	−29	.500	Semifinals
3	Jordan	6	2	4	414	452	−38	.333	Fifth place game
4	Malaysia	6	1	5	435	513	−78	.167	Seventh place game

Source: William Jones Cup
(H) Hosts

14 August
15:00

Report

Jordan	74–80	Malaysia

Xinzhuang Gymnasium, New Taipei City

14 August
17:00

Report

UC Irvine Anteaters (United States)	88–67	Republic of China White

Xinzhuang Gymnasium, New Taipei City

15 August
13:00

Report

UC Irvine Anteaters (United States)	84–66	Jordan

Xinzhuang Gymnasium, New Taipei City

15 August
17:00

Report

Republic of China White	82–73	Malaysia

Xinzhuang Gymnasium, New Taipei City

16 August
13:00

Report

UC Irvine Anteaters (United States)	87–55	Malaysia

Xinzhuang Gymnasium, New Taipei City

16 August
17:00

Report

Jordan	64–66	Republic of China White

Xinzhuang Gymnasium, New Taipei City

18 August
13:00

Report

Jordan	87–73	Malaysia

Xinzhuang Gymnasium, New Taipei City

18 August
17:00

Report

Republic of China White	57–81	(United States) UC Irvine Anteaters

Xinzhuang Gymnasium, New Taipei City

19 August
13:00

Report

UC Irvine Anteaters (United States)	81–62	Malaysia

Xinzhuang Gymnasium, New Taipei City

19 August
17:00

Report

Republic of China White	69–74	Jordan

Xinzhuang Gymnasium, New Taipei City

20 August
13:00

Report

UC Irvine Anteaters (United States)	80–49	Jordan

Xinzhuang Gymnasium, New Taipei City

20 August
17:00

Report

Malaysia	92–102	Republic of China White

Xinzhuang Gymnasium, New Taipei City

=== Classification round ===
==== Seventh-place game ====
21 August
17:00

Report

Malaysia	59–88	Japan

Xinzhuang Gymnasium, New Taipei City

==== Fifth-place game ====
21 August
19:00

Report

Jordan	91–96	(Philippines) Strong Group Athletics

Xinzhuang Gymnasium, New Taipei City

=== Knockout round ===
Semifinals
H (A2)	Republic of China Blue	71
B1	(United States) UC Irvine Anteaters	96
B2	Republic of China White	81
A1	(South Korea) Wonju DB Promy	102

Finals
B1	(United States) UC Irvine Anteaters	78
A1	(South Korea) Wonju DB Promy	98
Third place
H (A2)	Republic of China Blue	78
B2	Republic of China White	65

==== Semi-finals ====
22 August
17:00

Report

Republic of China Blue	71–96	(United States) UC Irvine Anteaters

Xinzhuang Gymnasium, New Taipei City

22 August
19:00

Report

Republic of China White	81–102	(South Korea) Wonju DB Promy

Xinzhuang Gymnasium, New Taipei City

==== Third-place game ====
23 August
17:00

Report

Republic of China Blue	78–65	Republic of China White

Xinzhuang Gymnasium, New Taipei City

==== Final ====
23 August
19:00

Report

(United States) UC Irvine Anteaters	78–98	(South Korea) Wonju DB Promy

Xinzhuang Gymnasium, New Taipei City

=== Awards ===
Award	Player	Team
All-Tournament Best Five	(Philippines) Ethan Alvano	(South Korea) Wonju DB Promy
All-Tournament Best Five	(United States) Rayshaun Hammonds	(South Korea) Wonju DB Promy
All-Tournament Best Five	(United States) Josiah Johnson	(United States) UC Irvine Anteaters
All-Tournament Best Five	(Taiwan) Song Xin-Hao	Republic of China Blue
All-Tournament Best Five	(Taiwan) Kao Kuo-Hao	Republic of China White
Most Valuable Player	(United States) Rayshaun Hammonds	(South Korea) Wonju DB Promy

=== Final standings ===
Rank	Team	Record
1st place, gold medalist(s)	(South Korea) Wonju DB Promy	7–1
2nd place, silver medalist(s)	(United States) UC Irvine Anteaters	7–1
3rd place, bronze medalist(s)	Republic of China Blue	2–6
4	Republic of China White	3–5
5	(Philippines) Strong Group Athletics	6–1
6	Jordan	2–5
7	Japan	2–5
8	Malaysia	1–6

== Women's tournament ==
=== Participating teams ===
Team	Country	Notes
Japan		National team (2026 Asian Games selection)
Lebanon		National team
Republic of China Blue	Taiwan (Chinese Taipei)	National team; hosts
Republic of China White	Taiwan (Chinese Taipei)	National developmental team; hosts
(South Korea) Cheongju KB Stars	South Korea	Club team (WKBL)
Thailand		National team

=== Group stage ===
==== Group A ====
Pos	Team	Pld	W	L	PF	PA	PD	PCT	Qualification
1	Japan	2	2	0	189	123	+66	1.000	Final
2	Lebanon	2	1	1	132	165	−33	.500	Third place game
3	Republic of China White (H)	2	0	2	122	155	−33	.000	Fifth place game

Source: William Jones Cup
(H) Hosts

26 August
17:00

Report

Lebanon	74–57	Republic of China White

Xinzhuang Gymnasium, New Taipei City

27 August
17:00

Report

Japan	108–58	Lebanon

Xinzhuang Gymnasium, New Taipei City

28 August
19:00

Report

Republic of China White	65–81	Japan

Xinzhuang Gymnasium, New Taipei City

==== Group B ====
Pos	Team	Pld	W	L	PF	PA	PD	PCT	Qualification
1	Republic of China Blue (H)	2	2	0	195	94	+101	1.000	Final
2	(South Korea) Cheongju KB Stars	2	1	1	181	115	+66	.500	Third place game
3	Thailand	2	0	2	65	232	−167	.000	Fifth place game

Source: William Jones Cup
(H) Hosts

26 August
19:30

Report

Cheongju KB Stars (South Korea)	69–75	Republic of China Blue

Xinzhuang Gymnasium, New Taipei City

27 August
19:00

Report

Republic of China Blue	120–25	Thailand

Xinzhuang Gymnasium, New Taipei City

28 August
17:00

Thailand	40–112	(South Korea) Cheongju KB Stars

Xinzhuang Gymnasium, New Taipei City

=== Final round ===
==== Fifth-place game ====
29 August
14:00

Report

Thailand	35–93	Republic of China White

Xinzhuang Gymnasium, New Taipei City

==== Third-place game ====
29 August
16:00

Report

Cheongju KB Stars (South Korea)	66–78	Lebanon

Xinzhuang Gymnasium, New Taipei City

==== Final ====
29 August
18:00

Report

Japan	75–66	Republic of China Blue

Xinzhuang Gymnasium, New Taipei City

=== Awards ===
Award	Player	Team
First Team	(Lebanon) Morgan Jones	Lebanon
First Team	(South Korea) Lee Chae-eun	(South Korea) Cheongju KB Stars
First Team	(Japan) Miyu Okamoto	Japan
First Team	(Taiwan) Han Ya-en	Republic of China Blue
First Team	(Taiwan) Hsiao Yu-wen	Republic of China Blue
Most Valuable Player	(Japan) Miyu Okamoto	Japan

=== Final standings ===
Rank	Team	Record
1st place, gold medalist(s)	Japan	3–0
2nd place, silver medalist(s)	Republic of China Blue	2–1
3rd place, bronze medalist(s)	Lebanon	2–1
4	(South Korea) Cheongju KB Stars	1–2
5	Republic of China White	1–2
6	Thailand	0–3
