= Rhenz Abando =

Filipino basketball player (born 1998)

No. 10 – Anyang Jung Kwan Jang Red Boosters
- Position: Shooting guard / small forward
- League: KBL

Personal information
- Born: March 11, 1998 (age 28) Santo Tomas, La Union, Philippines
- Listed height: 6 ft 2 in (187 cm)
- Listed weight: 157 lb (71 kg)

Career information
- High school: Bactad East National High School (Urdaneta, Pangasinan)
- College: Philippine College of Science and Technology (2016–2018); UST (2018–2020); Letran (2020–2022)
- Playing career: 2021–present

Career history
- 2021: San Juan Knights
- 2022–2024, 2025–present: Anyang Jung Kwan Jang Red Boosters

Career highlights
- KBL champion (2023); KBL regular season champion (2023); KBL Slam Dunk Contest champion (2023); KBL 3x3 All-Star Game champion (2023); NCAA Philippines champion (2021); NCAA Philippines Most Valuable Player (2021); NCAA Philippines Mythical Five (2021); NCAA Philippines Rookie of the Year (2021)

Rhenz Joseph Mamuyac Abando (born March 11, 1998) is a Filipino professional basketball player for the Anyang Jung Kwan Jang Red Boosters of the Korean Basketball League (KBL).

In the collegiate level, he played for the UST Growling Tigers, reaching the finals of UAAP Season 82 (2019). After UST held a controversial training camp amidst the COVID-19 pandemic, he transferred to the Letran Knights with whom he won the NCAA Season 97 championship (2022); he was also named NCAA Most Valuable Player (MVP) and Rookie of the Year. In June 2022, he decided to forgo his final year of college eligibility and signed with Anyang KGC of the KBL. In his rookie season in South Korea, he won the KBL championship, Slam Dunk Contest, and 3x3 All-Star Game.

Abando represented the Philippines national team in the 2022 FIBA Asia Cup and 2023 FIBA Basketball World Cup.

== College career ==
Abando played two years at Philippine College of Science and Technology in Pangasinan. He was coached by former Letran Knight Chris Calaguio. He was then recruited by Coach Aldin Ayo to play for the UST Growling Tigers in Metro Manila's UAAP.

=== UST Growling Tigers ===
Abando redshirted in 2018. He also played in the PBA D-League in 2019 with UST and represented the team in the UAAP 3x3 basketball championship for Season 81. After the tournament, Ateneo star player Thirdy Ravena called him a "threat to the whole league in the next coming years."

==== First season with UST and Finals appearance ====
In their first game of Season 82, the Tigers attempted 49 threes. Abando had 15 of those attempts, and made five of them for a 22-point debut. In their next game which they won against the UP Fighting Maroons, he had an all-around 12 points, seven rebounds, two assists, and two steals off the bench. For those performances, he was given the first Player of the Week for the season. However, in their rematch with UP in the second round, he was benched by Coach Ayo. The reason was because he was being recruited by two UAAP schools in the middle of the season, and it could have distracted the team. After affirming his commitment to UST, he was able to play again. Against the La Salle Green Archers, he made three straight threes in the fourth quarter to cut the 10 point lead of the Archers down to just one. He almost tied the game for UST, but he had his foot on the line when he made a jumper that could have been the game-tying three. Instead, La Salle escaped with the 80–79. At the end of the elimination round, UST faced off against the FEU Tamaraws to start the step-ladder semifinals. In that game, he and Renzo Subido made back-to-back threes in the third quarter that extended the lead for UST, who eventually came out with the win and were on to the next phase. The Maroons were their next opponents, with UP having the twice-to-beat advantage. In Game 1, he and Soulemane Chabi Yo both led the team in scoring with 17, as their hot shooting led UST to the win. In Game 2, he had 11 points and nine rebounds as UST completed their upset over UP. In the Finals, UST was swept by the Ateneo Blue Eagles in two games. He finished that season with averages of 11.9 points, 5.2 rebounds, and a team-high 1.3 blocks in 18 games played, while averaging just over 23 minutes off the bench.

==== Sorsogon Bubble ====
In 2020, the UST men's team covertly held a training camp in Sorsogon despite a ban on amateur team sports activities due to the COVID-19 pandemic. In September, the "bubble" training camp became known to the public. Abando was among the complainants regarding their poor conditions in the Tigers' "bubble" training. He shared that no one from the staff was tending to the players who had become sick during their stay there. Anticipating sanctions on UST due to ongoing investigations, Abando and six of his teammates transferred to other schools. Meanwhile, Ayo resigned as coach and was banned from the UAAP indefinitely.

=== Letran Knights (2020–2022) ===
Abando, along with his UST teammates Ira Bataller and Brent Paraiso transferred to reigning NCAA champion Letran. Before making his decision, he was also recruited by San Beda University, Adamson University, and National University. He chose Letran because of the talent level of the NCAA, he didn't want to face UST in the UAAP, and because he was assured by Coach Bonnie Tan that he wouldn't regret his decision. Before the start of the season, he played for the San Juan Knights in the inaugural Filbasket season.

==== Championship with Letran ====
Entering Season 97, the Knights were the favorites to win the championship. Abando made his winning debut for Letran with 19 points, eight rebounds, four blocks, and a team-high three assists against the CSB Blazers. He only had 11 points and one assist in their win against the Arellano Chiefs, but bounced back with 24 points, five rebounds, four assists and three steals against the Perpetual Altas as the team improved to 3–0. He then led the team with his 18 points and nine rebounds in a win against the San Sebastian Stags as the Knights secured the twice-to-beat advantage. The Knights then went on to complete their sweep of the elimination round with a win over the San Beda Red Lions.

The Knights beat the Altas again in the Final Four to get into the Finals, with Abando leading them with 24 points. In Game 1 of the Finals, he had 13 points and seven rebounds in just under 20 minutes, as he injured his foot following a highlight putback jam in the third quarter. The Knights endured without him in the fourth quarter to pull off the win. The injury was diagnosed as not a fracture, allowing him to recover. Before Game 2, he became the 11th Letran Knight to be crowned MVP, the first since Raymond Almazan in 2013. He also won Rookie of the Year, becoming the 4th player to win both Rookie of the Year and Most Valuable Player of the Year, the first since Mapua's Allwell Oraeme in 2015. Lastly, he was awarded a spot on the Mythical Team along with teammate Jeo Ambohot. He then went on to score eight of his 14 points in the fourth quarter to power the Knights to their 19th NCAA crown via a perfect 12–0 sweep of the season.

Abando finished that season by playing in the NCAA All-Star Game. He also received a Resolution of Congratulations and Commendation from the La Union Provincial Board for his accomplishments that season.

== Professional career ==
=== Anyang KGC / Jung Kwan Jang Red Boosters (2022–2024) ===
On June 28, 2022, Abando signed with Anyang KGC in the Korean Basketball League (KBL). He had originally planned to stay with Letran for his final year there, but his showing against the Korean national team made him change his mind. He had the blessing of Coach Tan, but the coach rued that Anyang had not coordinated with the college before signing him. The contract he signed was worth 237 million KRW or 13.89 million PHP for just his first year.

On October 3, 2022, Abando scored just two points off a highlight dunk before missing his next six shots in his KBL Cup debut. He then made up for his lackluster debut with 19 points in a win that sent them to the semifinal.

Abando missed Anyang's season opener due to a reported hip soreness. He made his debut on October 30, 2022, in a win over Suwon KT SonicBoom with six points and four rebounds in 10 minutes. He then had a breakout KBL game with 20 points, six blocks and three rebounds in a win over Wonju DB Promy. To follow up that performance, he had 17 points, seven rebounds, and two blocks in a win over the Changwon LG Sakers. In an 89–77 win over Suwon, he had 15 points, three rebounds, and a game-high four blocks. Against the Seoul SK Knights, he scored a career-high 30 points on five-of-seven shooting from three to go with six rebounds, two assists, and two blocks, but KGC still lost by one point to the Knights. After that game, he was held to below five points in his team's next five games. He broke out of the slump by scoring 15 points in a win over the Knights. He then dropped 20 points on seven of ten shooting and two blocks in a matchup against fellow Filipino import RJ Abarrientos and the Ulsan Hyundai Mobis Phoebus, which he won. On January 15, 2023, he won the Slam Dunk Contest and along with fellow Filipino imports Abarrientos and SJ Belangel, won the 3x3 All-Star Game. Abando then won the 2023 EASL Champions Week pre-season tournament with Anyang, putting up 11 points and two rebounds in a 90–84 win. Back in the KBL, on March 10, he had 28 points against the Seoul Samsung Thunders in an 82–79 loss. Anyang then ended the regular season with the best record in the league, its second time doing so. In the playoffs, he saw his minutes decrease, and Anyang advanced all the way to the Finals. In Game 2 of the Finals, he had 18 points, four rebounds, and three assists as Anyang tied the series. Game 4 saw him put up a team-high 22 points with four triples, five boards, three blocks, two assists, and one steal, against zero turnovers in over 35 minutes as a starter. However, Seoul tied the series 2–2. The following game, he went cold from the floor with only four points on 2-of-12 shooting, but made contributions on the defensive end with 10 rebounds and six blocks. Seoul took the series lead. In Game 6, he had a clutch and-one with 56 seconds left to complete a 22–2 run to get the comeback win and force Game 7. In Game 7, he didn't score a single point, but he contributed on defense as his teammates stepped up to give Anyang its fourth KBL title.

In a game against the Goyang Sono Skygunners during the 2023–24 season, Abando went for a rebound but fell back-first onto the court. As a result of the fall, he suffered fractures to his 3rd and 4th lumbar vertebrae, a sprained wrist, and a concussion. After missing 18 games, he made his return on March 3, 2024, against Goyang. He returned with 17 points, four rebounds, and three assists in 28 minutes and led Anyang to the win. That season, Anyang fell to second-to-last place. He then announced that he would not be returning to the team.

=== Free agency (2024–2025) ===
Abando skipped Season 49 draft for the Philippine Basketball Association and insistent of joining a team outside the Philippines. For the meantime he joined non-league Philippine team Strong Group Athletics (SGA) for the 2024 William Jones Cup in Taiwan. Abando however suffered a hand injury four games in. He received offers to play in South Korea, Japan, Dominican Republic and the ABA League but none of them were finalized.

Abando joined the SGA again for the 34th Dubai International Basketball Championship in January 2025. He also helped the team sweep the tournament once again at the 2025 William Jones Cup.

=== Return to Anyang (2025–present) ===
After Abando competed at the Jones Cup, the Red Boosters announced that they would be bringing him back. That season, they made it to the semifinals, where they lost to Busan KCC Egis.

== National team career ==
In 2022, Abando got to play for the Philippine national team in a pair of friendlies against Korea. He was also in the lineup for the third window of the 2023 FIBA Basketball World Cup qualifiers. He originally was a reserve for the 2022 FIBA Asia Cup, but after Dwight Ramos suffered from shin splints that forced him to drop out, he was included into the roster. In that tournament, they failed to qualify for the quarterfinals.

Abando was included in the 21-man pool for the 2023 FIBA World Cup, where he was eventually included in the final 12-man lineup. After playing limited minutes in his first game, he contributed eight points, two blocks and a highlight block in 14 minutes in a loss to Italy. In Gilas' win over China, he led the locals with 14 points, 5 rebounds, 1 block, and 1 steal.

In 2025, Abando was included in the national team pool for the 2025 FIBA Asia Cup. However, he was not able to practice with the team due to him competing at the 2025 Jones Cup.

== Career statistics ==
Legend
GP	Games played	MPG	Minutes per game
FG%	Field-goal percentage	3P%	3-point field-goal percentage	FT%	Free-throw percentage
RPG	Rebounds per game	APG	Assists per game	SPG	Steals per game
BPG	Blocks per game	PPG	Points per game	**Bold**	Career high

=== Korean Basketball League (KBL) ===
Year	Team	GP	MPG	FG%	3P%	FT%	RPG	APG	SPG	BPG	PPG
2022–23	Anyang	**50**	19.4	**.474**	**.356**	.740	2.7	1.0	.5	**1.0**	8.5
2023–24	Anyang	30	**24.1**	.464	.200	**.823**	**4.3**	**1.1**	**.8**	**1.0**	**9.9**

=== College ===
As of the end of Season 97

Year	Team	GP	MPG	FG%	3P%	FT%	RPG	APG	SPG	BPG	PPG
2021–22	Letran	12	18.8	.396	.259	.843	6.8	1.7	.8	1.2	15.6
Career		12	18.8	.396	.259	.843	6.8	1.7	.8	1.2	15.6

== Personal life ==
Abando has a brother, Jorel. He has a girlfriend, Rizyl Diamante.
