= Ethan Alvano =

Filipino-American basketball player

No. 17 – Wonju DB Promy
- Position: Shooting guard / point guard
- League: KBL

Personal information
- Born: July 28, 1996 (age 30) Corona, California, U.S.
- Listed height: 6 ft 0 in (182 cm)
- Listed weight: 170 lb (77 kg)

Career information
- High school: Corona (Corona, California)
- College: Eastern Michigan (2014–2016) CSU San Marcos (2016–2018)
- Playing career: 2019–present

Career history
- 2018–2019: San Miguel Alab Pilipinas
- 2020: Hi-Tech Bangkok City
- 2021–2022: Eisbären Bremerhaven
- 2022–present: Wonju DB Promy

Career highlights
- KBL Most Valuable Player Award (2024); KBL Best 5 (2024); William Jones Cup champions (2026); William Jones Cup Best Five (2026); CCAA Player of the Year (2018); First-team All-CCAA (2017, 2018); CCAA Newcomer of the Year (2017)

Ethan Herrera Alvano (born July 28, 1996) is a Filipino-American professional basketball player who plays for Wonju DB Promy of the Korean Basketball League (KBL). He played college basketball for the Eastern Michigan Eagles and the CSU San Marcos Cougars. Listed at 6 ft 0 in (1.82 m), he then went on to play in the Philippines, Germany, and currently, South Korea.

== Early life and high school career ==
Alvano was born in Corona, California, to Ramon and Rowena Alvano, where he grew up with one brother and one sister. However, his father died on July 3, 2011.

As a senior, Alvano averaged 23.2 points, 5.8 assists, 3.9 steals and 3.7 rebounds per game, while shooting 47% from the field, including 48% from 3-point range, and 86% from the free throw line. He led Corona High School to its first 20-win season since 2005–06. Some of his individual accolades include being named as co-MVP with fellow Fil-Am Sedrick Barefield in the Big VIII tournament that season, as well as being selected to the CIF All-Area Second Team.

== College career ==
=== Eastern Michigan Eagles ===
Alvano first played college basketball for the Eastern Michigan Eagles. In his freshman year, he started 17 of his 28 games. Among his highlights in his freshman season were his season-high 10 points against Concordia and seven assists in a game against Longwood. In his sophomore season, he had a season-high 13 points against Marygrove. He then had seven points in a loss to Ball State.

=== CSU San Marcos Cougars ===
Alvano then transferred to CSU San Marcos to play for the Cougars. In a loss to Humboldt State, he led the team with 24 points. Against Chico State, he had 18 points and six assists, but the Cougars still lost. He got a Player of the Week award for his averages of 25 points, 6.0 rebounds and 5.5 assists in two road wins.

In a rematch with Chico State, he scored 21 points, including the eventual game-winning three-pointer with just 2.1 second left in regulation. He also dished out seven assists and pulled down five rebounds on the night in a performance that earned him another Player of the Week award. He also broke or tied numerous school records in his first season with the team. At the end of the season, he made the All-CCAA First Team and won Newcomer of the Year award with 17.9 points (1st in the conference), 5.6 assists (1st in the conference) and 2.2 steals (2nd in the conference).

Alvano started his senior season with a win over Biola in which he scored 18 points and eight assists. He followed it up by breaking the school record for most points in a single game with 42 points, earning his third Player of the Week award in his time with the Cougars. Against CSU Monterey Bay, he made a game-winning triple with less than three seconds remaining.

In his final season, he was named CCAA Player of the Year and led the conference with 20.5 points, 5.9 assists and 2.6 steals per game. He was also named to the 2017–18 Division 2 Collegiate Commissioners Association (D2CCA) All-West Region first team honors. He became the first Cougar hit the 1,000-point milestone in CSUSM basketball program history and is currently the CSUSM all-time scoring leader.

== Professional career ==
=== San Miguel Alab Pilipinas ===
In 2018, Alvano joined the defending champions Alab Pilipinas for the 2018–19 ABL season. He had 21 points, seven assists, four steals, and two rebounds in a win over the Zhuhai Wolf Warriors. He then had 10 assists in a win over the Macau Black Bears. In a loss to Hong Kong Eastern, he had a double-double of 11 points and 10 assists. In another loss, this time to the Formosa Dreamers, he had 14 points, nine rebounds, and eight assists. That season, Alab failed to defend its title, losing to Hong Kong Eastern in the quarterfinals. In his time with Alab, he averaged 7.3 points, 6.1 assists, and 4.2 rebounds.

=== Hi-Tech Bangkok City ===
In 2020, Alvano played for Hi-Tech Bangkok City in the Thailand Basketball Super League (TBSL). In a win over the CLS Knights, he put up 18 points, 6 rebounds, 8 assists, and 4 steals. He also had a double-double with 39 points and 13 rebounds in a win over NS Matrix. In his time in Thailand, he averaged 19.8 points, 6.3 rebounds, and 4.8 assists.

=== Eisbären Bremerhaven ===
On September 6, 2021, it was announced that Alvano had signed with Eisbären Bremerhaven in Germany. He played with them for a season, averaging 9.8 points on 31% shooting from three, alongside 3.3 assists, 2.4 rebounds, and 1.1 steals.

=== Wonju DB Promy ===
==== 2022–23 season ====
On July 6, 2022, Alvano signed with Wonju DB Promy of the Korean Basketball League (KBL). Before playing in the KBL, he got to play in the Drew League, and played against Lebron James. In his first KBL game, he had 18 points and 10 assists, but couldn't lead Wonju to its first win. After losing their next game, he was finally able to lead Wonju to its first win with 11 points, six assists, five boards, and one steal against Suwon KT SonicBoom. Against Jeonju KCC, he had 26 points on 10-of-19 shooting from the field to get Wonju up to fourth in the standings.

The following game, despite his 22 points, Wonju lost to Anyang KGC. He had an all-around performance with 14 points, four rebounds, four assists, and four steals against Jeonju KCC, but Wonju still lost. In a rematch with Anyang, this time against fellow Filipino import Rhenz Abando, he had 12 points, seven rebounds, and five assists, but Abando had 20 points, three rebounds and six blocks to lead his side to the win.

Wonju kept losing games until their streak was broken against the Seoul Samsung Thunders, in which he had 14 points, eight rebounds, eight assists, two steals, and one block. Against Daegu KOGAS Pegasus, he had 21 points, eight assists, four boards, and two steals, but Wonju lost again. They then fell to 8–13 with a loss to the RJ Abarrientos-led Ulsan Hyundai Mobis Phoebus. Alongside Dewan Hernandez's 20 points, he was then able to lead Wonju to another win with 19 points to go along with four rebounds, three assists, and two steals.

The following game, Wonju fell to ninth place with a loss to Anyang. He then missed several games due to a flu as the losses continued to pile up for Wonju. He made his return in a win over Ulsan. They got back up to eighth place with a win over Seoul. Wonju got its fourth straight win of the season against Jeonju, in which he led the team with 15 points and four steals. The streak ended against the Changwon LG Sakers, despite his 19 points.

From there, Wonju went on a losing streak that lasted seven games. Still, Wonju was able to get to seventh with a win over Suwon KT in which he had 20 points with four triples, six assists, five rebounds, and three steals. However, his team failed to make the playoffs, finishing seventh in the standings with only the top 6 qualifying for the playoffs.

==== 2023–24 season ====
Against the Goyang Sono Skygunners, Alvano scored a career-high 33 points (including a jumper that sent the game into overtime) and also made a career-high 12 assists (including the assist for the game-winner). He won the KBL's MVP award as he averaged 15.9 points, 3.0 rebounds, a league-leading 6.6 assists, and 1.5 steals while not missing any games. With the win, he became the first Filipino Asian Quota Player to win the MVP, and the second to win an annual award after RJ Abarrientos won Rookie of the Year the previous season. He also made it to the KBL Best 5 for that season. Although they lost to eventual champions Busan KCC in the semifinals, he re-signed with the team for another season.

==== 2026–27 season ====
Wonju joined the 2026 William Jones Cup in Taiwan as part of the pre-season. Alvano was noted to have played a key role by averaging 26 minutes per game, recording 15.4 points, 7.0 assists, and 1.4 steals. Alvano was named to the Best of Five and helped Wonju win the title which was the third overall for a South Korean team in the invitational tournament.

== Career statistics ==
Legend
| GP | Games played | MPG | Minutes per game | FG% | Field goal percentage |
| 3P% | 3-point field goal percentage | FT% | Free throw percentage | RPG | Rebounds per game |
| APG | Assists per game | SPG | Steals per game | BPG | Blocks per game |
| PPG | Points per game | **Bold** | Career high | | Led the league |

=== College ===
| Year | Team | GP | GS | MPG | FG% | 3P% | FT% | RPG | APG | SPG | BPG | PPG |
|---|---|---|---|---|---|---|---|---|---|---|---|---|
| 2014–15 | Eastern Michigan | 28 | 17 | 14.5 | .235 | .195 | **.839** | 1.4 | 1.8 | .8 | .1 | 3.4 |
| 2015–16 | Eastern Michigan | 21 | 0 | 8.6 | .286 | .056 | .735 | .8 | .8 | .8 | .0 | 2.8 |
| 2016–17 | CSUSM | 28 | 28 | 34.6 | **.469** | **.421** | .743 | **3.7** | 5.6 | 2.2 | .2 | 17.9 |
| 2017–18 | CSUSM | **29** | **29** | **35.8** | .448 | .371 | .823 | **3.7** | **5.9** | **2.5** | **.3** | **20.5** |
| Career | | 106 | 74 | 27.1 | .427 | .354 | .788 | 2.5 | 3.7 | 1.7 | .2 | 11.8 |
