= 2025 William Jones Cup =

International basketball tournament

Tournament information
- Dates: M: 12–20 July 2025; W: 1–6 July 2025
- Host: Taiwan
- Venue: 2
- Teams: M: 9 W: 6
- Website: jonescup.meetagile.com

Final positions
- Champions: M: (Philippines) Strong Group Athletics (2nd title, 8th title for country); W: Japan Universiade
- 1st runners-up: M: Republic of China Blue; W: South Korea
- 2nd runners-up: M: Bahrain; W: WUG CTUSF Training
- MVP: W: Suzuno Higuchi

The 2025 William Jones Cup is the 44th staging of William Jones Cup, an international basketball tournament held in Taiwan. The women's tournament was held from 1 to 6 July 2025 at the Taipei Heping Basketball Gymnasium in Taipei, while the men's tournament is being held from 12 to 20 July 2025 at the Xinzhuang Gymnasium in New Taipei City.

== Men's tournament ==
=== Participating teams ===
Team	Country	Notes
NBL1 Rising Stars	Australia	League selection team
Bahrain		National team
Japan		National developmental team Described as an under-25 team.
Malaysia		National team
(Philippines) Strong Group Athletics	Philippines	Non-league club
Qatar B	Qatar	National B team
Republic of China Blue	Taiwan (Chinese Taipei)	National A team (hosts)
Republic of China White (hosts)	Taiwan (Chinese Taipei)	National developmental team (hosts)
United Arab Emirates		National team

=== Round robin ===
Pos	Team	Pld	W	L	GF	GA	GD	PCT
1	Strong Group Athletics (C)	8	8	0	710	555	+155	1.000
2	Republic of China Blue (H)	8	7	1	673	510	+163	.875
3	Bahrain	8	6	2	619	595	+24	.750
4	Republic of China White (H)	8	4	4	615	620	−5	.500
5	Malaysia	8	4	4	609	639	−30	.500
6	NBL1 Rising Stars	8	4	4	624	675	−51	.500
7	Japan	8	2	6	554	594	−40	.250
8	Qatar B	8	1	7	518	631	−113	.125
9	United Arab Emirates	8	0	8	560	663	−103	.000

Updated to match(es) played on 19 July 2025. Source: William Jones Cup
(C) Champions; (H) Hosts

12 July
13:00

Report

Japan	69–85	Bahrain
Scoring by quarter: 15−31, 20−18, 18−23, 16−13
Pts: Ozawa 26; Rebs: Maeno 7 Asts: Kurokawa 6		Pts: Rashed 19; Rebs: Chism 13; Asts: Chism 4

Xinzhuang Gymnasium, New Taipei City

12 July
15:00

Report

United Arab Emirates	74–80	Qatar B

Xinzhuang Gymnasium, New Taipei City

12 July
17:00

Report

Republic of China White	78–63	Malaysia

Xinzhuang Gymnasium, New Taipei City

12 July
19:30

Report

Republic of China Blue	90–56	NBL1 Rising Stars

Xinzhuang Gymnasium, New Taipei City

13 July
13:00

Report

Qatar B	84–86	Japan

Xinzhuang Gymnasium, New Taipei City

13 July
15:00

Report

NBL1 Rising Stars	81–72	United Arab Emirates

Xinzhuang Gymnasium, New Taipei City

13 July
17:00

Report

Bahrain	71–63	Republic of China White

Xinzhuang Gymnasium, New Taipei City

13 July
19:00

Report

Strong Group Athletics	67–56	Republic of China Blue

Xinzhuang Gymnasium, New Taipei City

14 July
13:00

Report

Malaysia	69–81	Bahrain

Xinzhuang Gymnasium, New Taipei City

14 July
15:00

Report

NBL1 Rising Stars	82–77	Qatar B

Xinzhuang Gymnasium, New Taipei City

14 July
17:00

Report

Japan	67–79	Strong Group Athletics

Xinzhuang Gymnasium, New Taipei City

14 July
19:00

Report

Republic of China Blue	88–73	United Arab Emirates

Xinzhuang Gymnasium, New Taipei City

15 July
13:00

Report

Bahrain	106–91	NBL1 Rising Stars

Xinzhuang Gymnasium, New Taipei City

15 July
15:00

Report

United Arab Emirates	87–88	Malaysia

Xinzhuang Gymnasium, New Taipei City

15 July
17:00

Report

Qatar B	54–81	Strong Group Athletics

Xinzhuang Gymnasium, New Taipei City

15 July
19:00

Report

Republic of China White	80–92	Republic of China Blue

Xinzhuang Gymnasium, New Taipei City

16 July
13:00

Report

United Arab Emirates	71–77	Bahrain

Xinzhuang Gymnasium, New Taipei City

16 July
15:00

Report

Japan	61–64	Malaysia

Xinzhuang Gymnasium, New Taipei City

16 July
17:00

Report

Strong Group Athletics	91–75	NBL1 Rising Stars

Xinzhuang Gymnasium, New Taipei City

16 July
19:00

Report

Qatar B	61–72	Republic of China White

Xinzhuang Gymnasium, New Taipei City

17 July
13:00

Report

Japan	74–55	United Arab Emirates

Xinzhuang Gymnasium, New Taipei City

17 July
15:00

Report

Bahrain	81–47	Qatar B

Xinzhuang Gymnasium, New Taipei City

17 July
17:00

Report

Republic of China White	75–107	Strong Group Athletics

Xinzhuang Gymnasium, New Taipei City

17 July
19:00

Report

Republic of China Blue	89–63	Malaysia

Xinzhuang Gymnasium, New Taipei City

18 July
13:00

Report

NBL1 Rising Stars	68–65	Japan

Xinzhuang Gymnasium, New Taipei City

18 July
15:00

Report

Strong Group Athletics	106–98	Malaysia

Xinzhuang Gymnasium, New Taipei City

18 July
17:00

Report

United Arab Emirates	66–88	Republic of China White

Xinzhuang Gymnasium, New Taipei City

18 July
19:00

Report

Republic of China Blue	93–50	Bahrain

Xinzhuang Gymnasium, New Taipei City

19 July
13:00

Report

Malaysia	91–85	NBL1 Rising Stars

Xinzhuang Gymnasium, New Taipei City

19 July
15:00

Report

Bahrain	68–92	Strong Group Athletics

Xinzhuang Gymnasium, New Taipei City

19 July
17:00

Report

Japan	74–76 (OT)	Republic of China White

Xinzhuang Gymnasium, New Taipei City

19 July
19:00

Report

Qatar B	63–82	Republic of China Blue

Xinzhuang Gymnasium, New Taipei City

20 July
13:00

Report

Malaysia	73–52	Qatar B

Xinzhuang Gymnasium, New Taipei City

20 July
15:00

Report

United Arab Emirates	62–87	Strong Group Athletics

Xinzhuang Gymnasium, New Taipei City

20 July
17:00

Report

Republic of China White	83–86	NBL1 Rising Stars

Xinzhuang Gymnasium, New Taipei City

20 July
19:00

Report

Republic of China Blue	83–58	Japan

Xinzhuang Gymnasium, New Taipei City

== Women's tournament ==
=== Participating teams ===
Team	Country	Notes
Japan Universiade	Japan	FISU World University Games team
South Korea		National team
Philippines		National team
Republic of China	Taiwan (Chinese Taipei)	National team (hosts)
WUG CTUSF Training	Taiwan (Chinese Taipei)	FISU World University Games training team (hosts)
Thailand		National team

=== Round robin ===
Pos	Team	Pld	W	L	GF	GA	GD	PCT
1	Japan Universiade (C)	5	4	1	423	332	+91	.800
2	South Korea	5	4	1	447	319	+128	.800
3	WUG CTUSF Training (H)	5	3	2	366	327	+39	.600
4	Republic of China (H)	5	3	2	378	359	+19	.600
5	Philippines	5	1	4	331	401	−70	.200
6	Thailand	5	0	5	270	477	−207	.000

Source: William Jones Cup
(C) Champions; (H) Hosts

2 July
14:00

Report

Thailand	49–103	Japan Universiade
Scoring by quarter: 12–26, 12–24, 14–27, 6–26
Pts: Grant 9 Rebs: Klunbut 4 Asts: Kunchuan, Klunbut 3		Pts: Fujisawa, Awatani 14; Rebs: Tanaka 8 Asts: Yamada 7

Taipei Heping Basketball Gymnasium, Taipei

2 July
16:00

Report

WUG CTUSF Training	74–95	South Korea
Scoring by quarter: 20–29, 16–20, 19–17, 19–29
Pts: Lin Chia-jung 17; Rebs: Hsiao Yu-wen 9 Asts: Huang Chiao-jun 7		Pts: Kang Lee-seul 26; Rebs: Kang Lee-seul, Lee Hae-ran 8 Asts: Heo Ye-eun 7

Taipei Heping Basketball Gymnasium, Taipei

2 July
18:30

Report

Republic of China	85–59	Philippines
Scoring by quarter: 15–16, 25–19, 24–11, 22–13
Pts: Cooks 17; Rebs: Cooks 11; Asts: Peng Hsiao-tong 7		Pts: Animam 18; Rebs: Animam 9 Asts: Animam 3

Taipei Heping Basketball Gymnasium, Taipei

3 July
14:00

Report

South Korea	69–75	Japan Universiade

Taipei Heping Basketball Gymnasium, Taipei

3 July
16:00

Report

Thailand	66–83	Philippines

Taipei Heping Basketball Gymnasium, Taipei

3 July
18:00

Report

WUG CTUSF Training	65–62	Republic of China

Taipei Heping Basketball Gymnasium, Taipei

4 July
14:00

Report

Philippines	58–80	South Korea

Taipei Heping Basketball Gymnasium, Taipei

4 July
16:00

Report

Japan Universiade	72–51	WUG CTUSF Training

Taipei Heping Basketball Gymnasium, Taipei

4 July
18:00

Report

Republic of China	80–64	Thailand

Taipei Heping Basketball Gymnasium, Taipei

5 July
14:00

Report

Philippines	74–94	Japan Universiade

Taipei Heping Basketball Gymnasium, Taipei

5 July
16:00

Report

Thailand	41–100	WUG CTUSF Training

Taipei Heping Basketball Gymnasium, Taipei

5 July
18:00

Report

Republic of China	62–92	South Korea

Taipei Heping Basketball Gymnasium, Taipei

6 July
14:00

Report

South Korea	111–50	Thailand

Taipei Heping Basketball Gymnasium, Taipei

6 July
16:00

Report

WUG CTUSF Training	76–57	Philippines

Taipei Heping Basketball Gymnasium, Taipei

6 July
18:00

Report

Republic of China	89–79	Japan Universiade

Taipei Heping Basketball Gymnasium, Taipei

=== Awards ===
The awards were announced on 6 July.

Award	Player
First team	Suzuno Higuchi
First team	Yumeha Fujisawa
First team	Park Ji-hyun
First team	Kang Ye-seul
First team	Sidney Cooks
Most Valuable Player	Suzuno Higuchi
