= Chris McCullough =

American basketball player (born 1995)

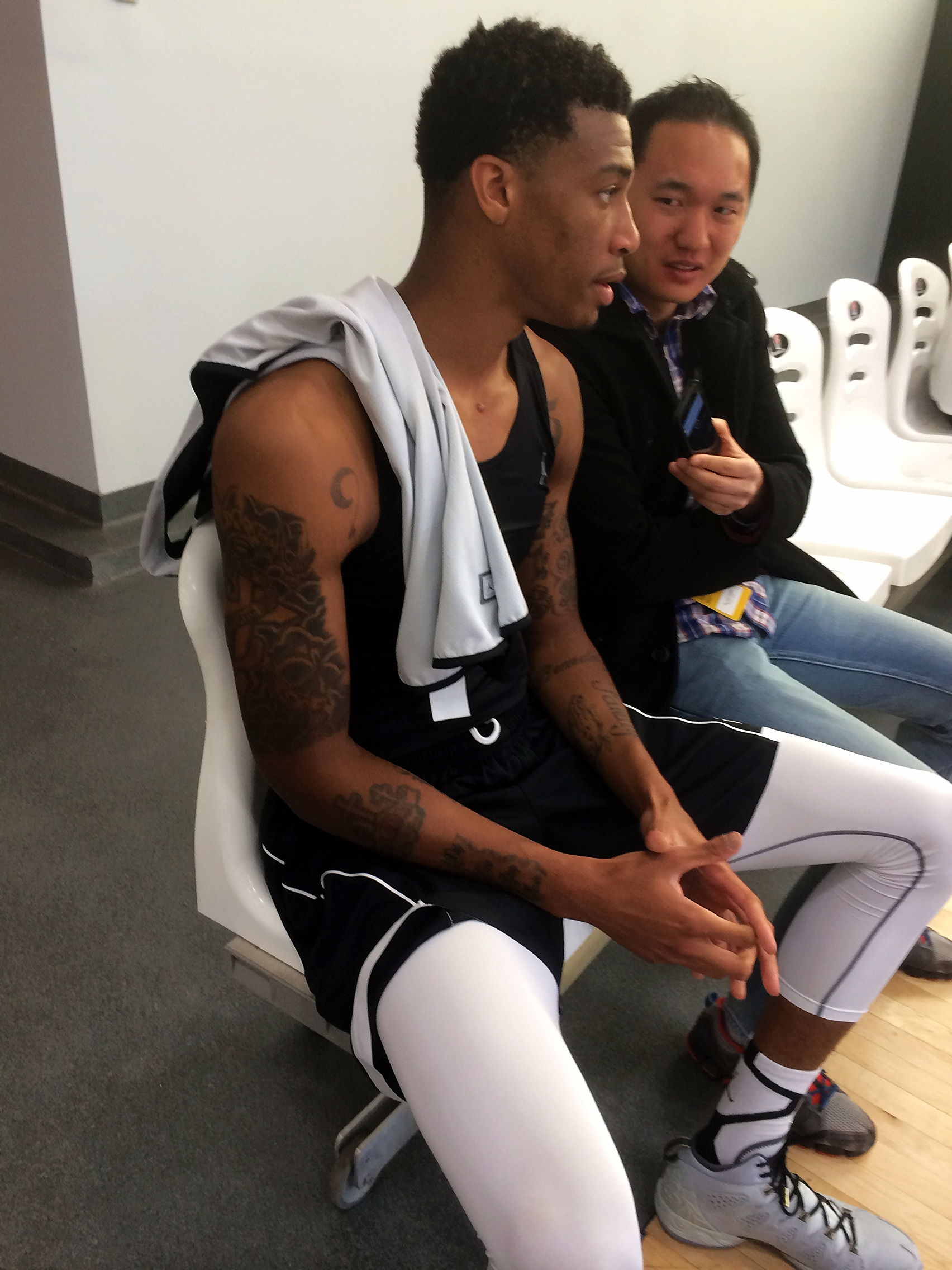
- McCullough in 2014

No. 13 – Seoul Samsung Thunders
- Position: Power forward
- League: KBL

Personal information
- Born: February 5, 1995 (age 31) The Bronx, New York, U.S.
- Listed height: 6 ft 9 in (206 cm)
- Listed weight: 201 lb (91 kg)

Career information
- High school: Salisbury School (Salisbury, Connecticut); Brewster Academy (Wolfeboro, New Hampshire); IMG Academy (Bradenton, Florida)
- College: Syracuse (2014–2015)
- NBA draft: 2015: 1st round, 29th overall pick
- Drafted by: Brooklyn Nets
- Playing career: 2015–present

Career history
- 2015–2017: Brooklyn Nets
- 2016–2017: →Long Island Nets
- 2017–2018: Washington Wizards
- 2017–2018: →Northern Arizona Suns
- 2018: →Wisconsin Herd
- 2018: →Erie BayHawks
- 2018: Shanxi Brave Dragons
- 2019: Rio Grande Valley Vipers
- 2019: Brujos de Guayama
- 2019: San Miguel Beermen
- 2019–2020: Anyang KGC
- 2020: Rytas Vilnius
- 2020–2021: Anyang KGC
- 2021: Gigantes de Carolina
- 2021–2022: New Taipei Kings
- 2023–2024: Formosa Dreamers
- 2025: Pelita Jaya
- 2025–2026: Taoyuan Taiwan Beer Leopards
- 2026: TNT Tropang 5G
- 2026: Vaqueros de Bayamón
- 2026–present: Seoul Samsung Thunders

Career highlights
- BSN Champion (2026); PBA champion (2019 Commissioner's); NBA D-League All-Star (2017); P. League+ Comeback Player of the Year (2024)
- Stats at NBA.com
- Stats at Basketball Reference

Christopher Albert McCullough (born February 5, 1995) is an American professional basketball player for the Seoul Samsung Thunders of the Korean Basketball League (KBL). He played college basketball for the Syracuse Orange.

== High school career ==
McCullough attended Salisbury School for his freshman and sophomore years. During his sophomore season, he led the Salisbury varsity basketball team to its first ever NEPSAC Class A championship. In the championship game, McCullough scored 26 points, while also adding eight rebounds and two blocked shots. At Salisbury, McCullough was coached by Jeff Ruskin. Following his sophomore year at Salisbury, McCullough transferred to Brewster Academy and then, later on, to IMG Academy.

== College career ==
As a freshman at Syracuse in 2014–15, McCullough started in the team's first 16 games of the season before a knee injury suffered against Florida State on January 11 required surgery and ended his campaign. In those 16 games, he averaged 9.3 points, 6.9 rebounds, 1.1 assists, 1.7 steals and 2.1 blocks in 28.1 minutes per game.

== Professional career ==
=== Brooklyn Nets (2015–2017) ===
In April 2015, McCullough declared for the 2015 NBA draft, while still recovering from an ACL injury. Despite that, on June 25, he was selected with the 29th overall pick by the Brooklyn Nets. On July 1, he signed his rookie scale contract with the Nets. He missed the first half of the 2015–16 season with the ACL injury he sustained as a freshman at Syracuse. On February 5, 2016, he was activated for the first time, but did not play for the Nets against the Sacramento Kings. Four days later, he made his NBA debut, recording 2 points, 2 rebounds, 1 steal and 1 block in just under 11 minutes off the bench in the Nets' 105–104 win over the Denver Nuggets.

On April 6, 2016, McCullough scored 10 points against the Washington Wizards, reaching double-digits for the first time in his career. He was subsequently elevated to the starting line-up the following game, scoring 12 points on April 8 against the Charlotte Hornets. In his third straight start for the Nets on April 11, he had another 12-point game in a loss to the Wizards.

During his second season with Brooklyn, McCullough had multiple assignments with the Long Island Nets of the NBA Development League.

=== Washington Wizards (2017–2018) ===
On February 22, 2017, McCullough was traded, along with Bojan Bogdanović, to the Washington Wizards in exchange for Andrew Nicholson, Marcus Thornton and a 2017 protected first-round draft pick. On March 1, 2017, he made his debut for the Wizards, making just one free throw in 1:39 of action during a win over the Toronto Raptors. Two days later, he was assigned to the Northern Arizona Suns of the NBA Development League, pursuant to the flexible assignment rule. He remained with Northern Arizona until the end of the 2016–17 D-League season.

McCullough signed with the Detroit Pistons to a training camp contract but was waived on October 7, 2018.

=== Shanxi Brave Dragons (2018–2019) ===
On October 8, 2018, McCullough signed with Shanxi Brave Dragons of the Chinese Basketball Association. On October 21, 2018, he made his debut for Shanxi, contributed twenty six points and eight rebounds in a win over the Sichuan Blue Whales.

=== Rio Grande Valley Vipers (2019) ===
On January 28, 2019, the Rio Grande Valley Vipers welcomed McCullough via Twitter.

=== Brujos de Guayama (2019) ===
On May 14, 2019, McCullough joined the Brujos de Guayama of the Baloncesto Superior Nacional in Puerto Rico.

=== San Miguel Beermen (2019) ===
On July 2, 2019, McCullough signed with the San Miguel Beermen as a replacement for Charles Rhodes as the team's import for the 2019 PBA Commissioner's Cup. On his PBA debut, McCullough exploded for a professional then-career-high 47 points to go along with 10 rebounds and 6 3-pointers made to lead the Beermen towards the win against the NLEX Road Warriors. On July 10, McCullough recorded 37 points, 13 rebounds and 4 assists in a 128–108 win over the Phoenix Fuel Masters. Two days after, McCullough again led the Beermen towards a win over the Rain or Shine Elasto Painters, 89–87. In that game, McCullough recorded 24 points, 17 rebounds, 4 assists and 5 blocks. Four days after, McCullough recorded 27 points, 16 rebounds and 3 blocks but in a 91–95 loss to the Meralco Bolts, in the last game of the elimination round. On July 31, 2019, McCullough again put on a show for a new career-high 51 points in a loss against Rain or Shine. He ended the series 2 days later with 35 points.

McCullough and the Beermen eventually won the 2019 PBA Commissioner's Cup championship, his first as a professional, in six games of a best-of-seven series. McCullough scored the team high of 35 points, 19 rebounds, and 4 assists against the TNT KaTropa.

=== Anyang KGC (2019–2020) ===
In July 2019, McCullough signed with the Anyang KGC of the Korean Basketball League.

=== Rytas Vilnius (2020) ===
On August 28, 2020, McCullough signed with Rytas Vilnius. On October 3, McCullough was suspended by Rytas Vilnius because he was suspected of escaping from a car accident after the Lithuanian Police found abandoned and damaged Jeep Renegade, which was given to McCullough by the club, in a parking lot and launched an investigation. The Rytas allowed McCullough to return to the team on October 12 as he deeply regretted the incident of violating the club's internal rules and convinced head coach Donaldas Kairys that he is motivated to play. He played his first game after the suspension on October 17 and scored 13 points, while the Rytas achieved a 60–98 victory versus the Neptūnas Klaipėda. On November 10, it was reported that Rytas was parting ways with McCullough.

=== Second stint with Anyang KGC (2020–2021) ===
On November 30, 2020, McCullough signed with Anyang KGC, replacing Earl Clark. On March 9, 2021, he was replaced by Jared Sullinger.

On June 2, 2021, McCullough was reported to have signed with Al-Ahli of the Bahraini Premier League, he didn't play any games for the team.

=== Gigantes de Carolina (2021) ===
On August 27, 2021, McCullough signed with Gigantes de Carolina of the Baloncesto Superior Nacional.

=== New Taipei Kings (2021–2022) ===
On November 17, 2021, McCullough signed with the New Taipei Kings of the P. League+. On March 8, 2022, McCullough tore his left ACL during New Taipei Kings’s game against Taoyuan Pauian Pilots in the 2021-22 P.League+ tournament held at Taoyuan Arena.

=== Formosa Taishin Dreamers (2023–2024) ===
On February 27, 2023, McCullough signed with the Formosa Taishin Dreamers of the P. League+. He had a brief stint with Philippine team Strong Group Athletics (SGA) at the 2024 William Jones Cup tournament in Taiwan.

=== Indonesia (2025) ===
After his stint with SGA, McCullough received an offer to play for a team in Indonesia. A potential return to the PBA in the Philippines was averted with negotiations of Converge FiberXers to sign him as an import for the 2024–25 Commissioner's Cup reportedly failed.

In December 2024, McCullough joined the Pelita Jaya for the 2025 Basketball Champions League Asia (BCL Asia).

=== Taoyuan Taiwan Beer Leopards (2025–2026) ===
On August 15, 2025, McCullough signed with the Taoyuan Taiwan Beer Leopards of the Taiwan Professional Basketball League (TPBL). Taoyuan finished as semifinalists of the 2025–26 season after being eliminated by the New Taipei Kings. He left the team in May 2026.

=== TNT Tropang 5G (2026) ===
The TNT Tropang 5G has brought in McCullough as a last-minute replacement for the injured Bol Bol as their import for the 2026 PBA Commissioner's Cup. TNT chose McCullough over their other option Malick Diouf as their import player for game 4 of the tournament's semifinals. On June 15, 2026, McCullough notched a professional-high of 53 points to go along with 22 rebounds in a 98-90 victory over the Barangay Ginebra San Miguel.

=== Vaqueros de Bayamón (2026-present) ===
On July 11, 2026, the Vaqueros de Bayamón signed McCullough for the 2026 BSN Playoffs after the team lost Jae Crowder for the remainder of the season. That same day, Chris had a dominant 21 point, 10 rebound debut, including a clutch and-one play that sealed a 73–71 victory over his former team the Gigantes de Carolina.. On July 28, 2026, in game 3 of the BSN Conference Finals against the Criollos de Caguas with the best-of-seven series tied at one game apiece, McCullough recorded 22 points and eight rebounds to lead the Vaqueros to a commanding 106–83 victory and a 2–1 series lead. On August 23, 2026, McCullough was a key contributor in helping the Vaqueros de Bayamón secure their second consecutive BSN championship.

== National team ==
McCullough has expressed interest to play for the Philippine national team in 2019, but as a non-Filipino citizen he has to be given citizenship through naturalization to be eligible. By 2024, McCullough has lost hope but after his performance at the 2024 William Jones Cup with Strong Group Athletics he has received offers for Taiwanese citizenship to be able to play for the Chinese Taipei national team.

== NBA career statistics ==
Legend
GP	Games played	GS	Games started	MPG	Minutes per game
FG%	Field goal percentage	3P%	3-point field goal percentage	FT%	Free throw percentage
RPG	Rebounds per game	APG	Assists per game	SPG	Steals per game
BPG	Blocks per game	PPG	Points per game	**Bold**	Career high

=== Regular season ===
Year	Team	GP	GS	MPG	FG%	3P%	FT%	RPG	APG	SPG	BPG	PPG
2015–16	Brooklyn	**24**	**4**	**15.1**	.404	**.382**	.478	**2.8**	**.4**	**1.2**	**.5**	**4.7**
2016–17	Brooklyn	14	0	5.1	**.516**	.167	**.667**	1.2	.1	.1	.1	2.5
2016–17	Washington	2	0	4.0	.000	.000	.500	1.0	.0	.5	.0	.5
2017–18	Washington	19	0	4.7	.429	.125	.643	1.3	.2	.0	.3	2.4
Career		59	4	9.0	.426	.306	.548	1.9	.3	.5	.3	3.3

== International career statistics ==
Legend
GP	Games played	MPG	Minutes per game	FG%	Field goal percentage
3P%	3-point field goal percentage	FT%	Free throw percentage	RPG	Rebounds per game
APG	Assists per game	SPG	Steals per game	BPG	Blocks per game
PPG	Points per game	**Bold**	Career high		Led the league

As of the end of the 2023 PLG regular season.

Year	Team	League	GP	MPG	FG%	3P%	FT%	RPG	APG	SPG	BPG	PPG
2018–19	Brujos de Guayama	BSN	8	27.1	46.1%	25.0%	81.6%	9.0	1.5	1.1	0.8	16.3
2018–19	Shanxi Zhongyu	CBA	3	26.2	**47.2%**	37.5%	**83.3%**	8.0	2.0	0.3	0.3	15.7
2019	San Miguel Beermen	PBA	**16**	**43.0**	46.6%	33.6%	74.8%	**15.1**	**3.5**	1.3	**2.4**	**32.4**
2021–22	New Taipei Kings	PLG	7	32.19	35.53%	**42.11%**	58.82%	8.57	1.71	0.86	1.14	20.86
2022–23	Formosa Taishin Dreamers	PLG	8	30.49	44.66%	15.38%	63.64%	12.5	1.88	**2.38**	0.75	18.88
