= Strong Group Athletics (basketball) =

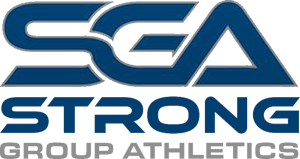
- Leagues: N/A
- Team manager: Jacob Lao
- Head coach: Charles Tiu
- Ownership: Strong Group Athletics
- Championships: William Jones Cup: 2 (2024, 2025)
- Website: www.sgathletics.com
Home	Away

Strong Group Athletics (SGA) is a men's basketball team based in the Philippines. It is owned and managed by an organization of the same name, which was founded by the Filipino businessman Frank Lao. They are not part of any domestic leagues but a frequent participant of international club tournaments such as the William Jones Cup and the Dubai International Basketball Championship.

== History ==
=== 2023 Dubai tournament ===
The Strong Group Athletics (SGA) organization maintains its own basketball team which has competed in various international tournament.

SGA debuted in the 2023 Dubai International Basketball Championship in the United Arab Emirates, with Mighty Sports and Acto City sponsoring their stint. Mighty Sports, which was owned by Caesar Wongchuking, gave way to help Jacob Lao transition from being a collegiate player to a sports official. Lao is the son of businessman and sports patron Frank Lao.

SGA had Charles Tiu as coach who formerly guided Mighty and its roster is reinforced by former NBA players. While the team was being formed as early as December 2022, training only began on January 11, 2023 for the tournament which began late that month. Strong Group finished as quarterfinalists.

=== 2024 tournaments ===
They returned in 2024 edition with Tiu reprising his role and backed by Brian Goorjian as team consultant. Concluding their 2023 campaign as a disappointment, SGA continued their policy of tapping former NBA players. They reached the final, but lost the title to Lebanese club Al Riyadi. They took part at the 2024 William Jones Cup in 2024 and finished as champions.

=== 2025 Dubai tournament ===
SGA returned in the 2025 edition of the Dubai tournament. They lost the semifinals against Tunisia and boycotted the third place playoff in protest of the officiating. They finished fourth, with their final game ruled as a 0–20 default. Philippine Basketball Association commissioner, William Marcial expressed his preference that SGA should have played the game as it is representing the Philippines in the tournament.

=== 2025 and 2026 William Jones Cup ===
They defended their William Jones Cup title in the 2025 edition In the 2026 edition, SGA failed to defend their title despite placing second in a group of four teams with the host team to the semifinals advancing regardless of the result. SGA won its last match, the fifth place game against Jordan.

== Current roster ==
The following is the roster of the Strong Group for the 2025 William Jones Cup.

Strong Group – 2025 William Jones Cup roster
Players	Coaches
Pos. / No. / Nat. / Name / Ht. / Wt. / Age	Head coach: (Philippines) Charles Tiu; Legend: (C) Team captain; (I) Import; Nat. – Flags indicate national team eligibility at FIBA sanctioned events; Age – describes age on January 24, 2025

== Players ==
Player	Nationality	Tournament				
Player	Nationality	2023	2024		2025	
Player	Nationality	DIBC	DIBC	WJC	DIBC	WJC
Rhenz Abando	Philippines			Yes		
RJ Abarrientos	Philippines			Yes		
Tajuan Agee	United States			Yes		
BJ Andrade	Philippines	Yes				
Renaldo Balkman	Puerto Rico	Yes				
Justine Baltazar	Philippines		Yes			
Sedrick Barefield	Philippines	Yes				
Andray Blatche	Philippines		Yes			
JD Cagulangan	Philippines	Yes	Yes			
Geo Chiu	Philippines			Yes		
Francis Escandor	Philippines		Yes			
DJ Fenner	United States			Yes		
Inand Fornillos	Philippines	Yes				
Will Gozum	Philippines	Yes				
Jordan Heading	Philippines		Yes	Yes		
Dwight Howard	United States		Yes			
Dave Ildefonso	Philippines			Yes		
Ange Kouame	Philippines			Yes		
Jacob Lao	Philippines			Yes		
Jerom Lastimosa	Philippines	Yes				
Allen Liwag	Philippines		Yes	Yes		
Francis Lopez	Philippines	Yes				
Jonathan Manalili	Philippines			Yes		
McKenzie Moore	United States		Yes			
Chris McCullough	United States			Yes		
Shabazz Muhammad	United States	Yes				
Miguel Oczon	Philippines	Yes				
Kevin Quiambao	Philippines	Yes	Yes			
Kiefer Ravena	Philippines			Yes		
André Roberson	United States		Yes			Yes
Justine Sanchez	Philippines		Yes			
Caelan Tiongson	Philippines			Yes		
Tony Ynot	Philippines		Yes	Yes		
Nick Young	United States	Yes				
Javi Gomez de Liano	Philippines					Yes
Ian Miller	United States					Yes

== Head coaches ==
- (Philippines) Charles Tiu (2023–)

== Honors ==
- William Jones Cup

Champions (2): 2024, 2025

- Dubai International Basketball Championship

Runner-up (1): 2024

== See also ==
- Mighty Sports
- Go For Gold
- Benilde Blazers
- Pilipinas Super League
