= Chinese Taipei at the FISU World University Games =

Chinese Taipei at the Universiade
- IOC code: TPE
- National federation: Chinese Taipei University Sports Federation (中華民國大專院校體育總會)
- Medals: Gold 100 Silver 129 Bronze 146 Total 375

Summer appearances
- 1987; 1989; 1991; 1993; 1995; 1997; 1999; 2001; 2003; 2005; 2007; 2009; 2011; 2013; 2015; 2019; 2021; 2025

Winter appearances
- 2005; 2007; 2009; 2011; 2013; 2017; 2019; 2023; 2025

"Chinese Taipei," the country designation under which Taiwan competes at international sports events, has participated in all editions of the Summer Universiade held since the 1989 Summer Universiade (the event's fourteenth year).

== Medal count ==
=== Summer Universiade ===
Chinese Taipei has won 349 medals in 18 appearances at the Summer Universiade and are in sixteenth place on the all-time Summer Universiade medal table.

Host nation

Edition				
(Socialist Federal Republic of Yugoslavia) Zagreb 1987	0	0	0	0
(West Germany) Duisburg 1989	0	0	0	0
(United Kingdom) Sheffield 1991	1	0	0	1
(United States) Buffalo 1993	0	0	3	3
(Japan) Fukuoka 1995	1	1	2	4
(Italy) Sicily 1997	2	1	1	4
(Spain) Palma 1999	2	2	0	4
(China) Beijing 2001	0	3	5	8
(South Korea) Daegu 2003	3	3	5	11
(Turkey) Ízmir 2005	6	2	4	12
(Thailand) Bangkok 2007	7	9	13	29
(Serbia) Belgrade 2009	7	5	5	17
(China) Shenzhen 2011	7	9	16	32
(Russia) Kazan 2013	4	4	7	15
(South Korea) Gwangju 2015	6	12	18	36
Taipei 2017	30	35	31	96
(Italy) Naples 2019	9	13	10	32
(China) Chengdu 2021	10	17	19	46
(Germany) Rhine-Ruhr 2025	5	13	7	25
Total	100	129	146	375

=== Winter Universiade ===
Chinese Taipei has won 1 medal at the Winter Universiade and is in forty-seventh place on the all-time Winter Universiade medal table.

Edition				
(Austria) Innsbruck 2005	0	0	0	0
(Italy) Turin 2007	0	0	0	0
(China) Harbin 2009	0	0	0	0
(Turkey) Erzurum 2011	0	0	0	0
(Italy) Trentino 2013	0	0	1	1
(Kazakhstan) Almaty 2017	0	0	0	0
(Russia) Krasnoyarsk 2019	0	0	0	0
(United States) Lake Placid 2023	0	0	0	0
(Italy) Turin 2025	0	0	0	0
Total	0	0	1	1

== See also ==
- Chinese Taipei at the Olympics
- Chinese Taipei at the Paralympics
