= 2024 William Jones Cup =

International basketball tournament

Tournament information
- Dates: M: 13–21 July 2024; W: 6–10 July 2024
- Host: Taiwan
- Venue: 1
- Teams: M: 9 W: 6
- Website: jonescup.meetagile.com

Final positions
- Champions: M: (Philippines) Strong Group Athletics; W: Japan Universiade
- 1st runners-up: M: Republic of China Blue; W: Republic of China Blue
- 2nd runners-up: M: Ukraine; W: Republic of China White

The 2024 William Jones Cup is the 43rd staging of William Jones Cup, an international basketball tournament held at the Xinzhuang Gymnasium in New Taipei, Taiwan. The men's tournament was held from 13 to 21 July 2024, while the women's tournament was held from 6 to 10 July 2024.

== Men's tournament ==
=== Participating teams ===
Team	Notes
(Australia) Brisbane South Basketball League (BSBL) Guardians	League selection team
Malaysia	National team, foreign-reinforced
Japan U22	National youth team
(Philippines) Strong Group Athletics	Non-league club
Republic of China Blue	National teams
Republic of China White	National teams
United Arab Emirates	National teams
Ukraine	National teams
(United States) Future Sports USA	—

=== Team standings ===
Pos	Team	Pld	W	L	PF	PA	PD	Pts
1	(Philippines) Strong Group Athletics	8	8	0	749	594	+155	16
2	Republic of China Blue	8	7	1	694	573	+121	15
3	Ukraine	8	6	2	620	512	+108	14
4	Malaysia	8	5	3	626	613	+13	13
5	Republic of China White	8	4	4	643	648	−5	12
6	Japan U22	8	3	5	563	605	−42	11
7	United Arab Emirates (Note: United Arab Emirates 1–1, PD +7 BSBL Guardians 1–1, PD +3 Future Sports USA 1–1, PD −10)	8	1	7	574	715	−141	9
8	(Australia) BSBL Guardians	8	1	7	590	700	−110	9
9	(United States) Future Sports USA	8	1	7	606	702	−96	9

Source: William Jones Cup

=== Games ===
==== Day 1 ====
13 July
13:00

Report

Strong Group Athletics (Philippines)	104–79	United Arab Emirates
Scoring by quarter: 32–18, 18–14, 23–25, 31–22

Xinzhuang Gymnasium, New Taipei City

13 July
15:00

Report

Future Sports USA (United States)	69–65	(Australia) BSBL Guardians
Scoring by quarter: 18–16, 13–16, 20–21, 18–12

Xinzhuang Gymnasium, New Taipei City

13 July
17:00

Report

Republic of China White	79–84	Malaysia
Scoring by quarter: 17–15, 24–16, 14–29, 24–24

Xinzhuang Gymnasium, New Taipei City

13 July
19:30

Report

Republic of China Blue	85–65	Japan U22
Scoring by quarter: 19–24, 31–17, 17–11, 18–13

Xinzhuang Gymnasium, New Taipei City

==== Day 2 ====
14 July
13:00

Report

BSBL Guardians (Australia)	69–91	(Philippines) Strong Group Athletics
Scoring by quarter: 10–34, 14–15, 27–23, 18–19

Xinzhuang Gymnasium, New Taipei City

14 July
15:00

Report

Japan U22	67–63	(United States) Future Sports USA
Scoring by quarter: 11–20, 14–14, 23–14, 19–15

Xinzhuang Gymnasium, New Taipei City

14 July
17:00

Report

United Arab Emirates	59–89	Republic of China White
Scoring by quarter: 18–20, 20–20, 12–26, 9–23

Xinzhuang Gymnasium, New Taipei City

14 July
19:00

Report

Ukraine	58–83	Republic of China Blue
Scoring by quarter: 10–16, 15–22, 13–24, 20–21

Xinzhuang Gymnasium, New Taipei City

==== Day 3 ====
15 July
13:00

Report

United Arab Emirates	70–83	Malaysia
Scoring by quarter: 23–28, 19–18, 12–11, 16–26

Xinzhuang Gymnasium, New Taipei City

15 July
15:00

Report

Japan U22	76–65	(Australia) BSBL Guardians
Scoring by quarter: 27–13, 23–18, 18–20, 8–14

Xinzhuang Gymnasium, New Taipei City

15 July
17:00

Report

Strong Group Athletics (Philippines)	82–74	Ukraine
Scoring by quarter: 27–21, 16–20, 11–17, 28–16

Xinzhuang Gymnasium, New Taipei City

15 July
19:00

Report

Republic of China Blue	82–76	(United States) Future Sports USA
Scoring by quarter: 24–24, 13–9, 21–26, 24–17

Xinzhuang Gymnasium, New Taipei City

==== Day 4 ====
16 July
13:00

Report

BSBL Guardians (Australia)	57–98	Ukraine
Scoring by quarter: 12–22, 10–22, 18–32, 17–22

Xinzhuang Gymnasium, New Taipei City

16 July
15:00

Report

Future Sports USA (United States)	67–109	Malaysia
Scoring by quarter: 16–32, 14–21, 18–34, 19–22

Xinzhuang Gymnasium, New Taipei City

16 July
17:00

Report

Japan U22	82–78	United Arab Emirates
Scoring by quarter: 16–14, 24–27, 21–19, 21–18

Xinzhuang Gymnasium, New Taipei City

16 July
19:00

Report

Republic of China White	77–82	Republic of China Blue
Scoring by quarter: 21–25, 24–15, 15–26, 17–16

Xinzhuang Gymnasium, New Taipei City

==== Day 5 ====
17 July
13:00

Report

United Arab Emirates	77–63	(United States) Future Sports USA
Scoring by quarter: 18–17, 18–12, 26–20, 15–14

Xinzhuang Gymnasium, New Taipei City

17 July
15:00

Report

Ukraine	63–47	Japan U22
Scoring by quarter: 12–10, 16–18, 14–10, 21–9

Xinzhuang Gymnasium, New Taipei City

17 July
17:00

Report

Strong Group Athletics (Philippines)	89–54	Malaysia
Scoring by quarter: 21–11, 19–25, 19–12, 30–6

Xinzhuang Gymnasium, New Taipei City

17 July
19:00

Report

BSBL Guardians (Australia)	78–90	Republic of China White
Scoring by quarter: 27–23, 20–21, 12–27, 19–19

Xinzhuang Gymnasium, New Taipei City

==== Day 6 ====
18 July
13:00

Report

Future Sports USA (United States)	90–112	(Philippines) Strong Group Athletics
Scoring by quarter: 28–29, 32–27, 16–33, 14–23

Xinzhuang Gymnasium, New Taipei City

18 July
15:00

Report

United Arab Emirates	93–100	(Australia) BSBL Guardians
Scoring by quarter: 18–23, 28–30, 20–23, 27–24

Xinzhuang Gymnasium, New Taipei City

18 July
17:00

Report

Republic of China White	50–77	Ukraine
Scoring by quarter: 15–20, 16–23, 11–18, 8–16

Xinzhuang Gymnasium, New Taipei City

18 July
19:00

Report

Malaysia	66–86	Republic of China Blue
Scoring by quarter: 8–21, 23–24, 15–21, 20–20

Xinzhuang Gymnasium, New Taipei City

==== Day 7 ====
19 July
13:00

Report

Japan U22	79–92	(Philippines) Strong Group Athletics
Scoring by quarter: 18–22, 18–32, 19–16, 24–22

Xinzhuang Gymnasium, New Taipei City

19 July
15:00

Report

Ukraine	74–65	Malaysia
Scoring by quarter: 18–10, 19–13, 22–22, 15–20

Xinzhuang Gymnasium, New Taipei City

19 July
17:00

Report

Future Sports USA (United States)	97–108	Republic of China White
Scoring by quarter: 16–20, 24–32, 28–30, 29–26

Xinzhuang Gymnasium, New Taipei City

19 July
19:00

Report

Republic of China Blue	100–68	United Arab Emirates
Scoring by quarter: 25–15, 28–21, 19–15, 28–17

Xinzhuang Gymnasium, New Taipei City

==== Day 8 ====
20 July
13:00

Report

Japan U22	72–79	Malaysia
Scoring by quarter: 15–25, 21–10, 11–21, 25–23

Xinzhuang Gymnasium, New Taipei City

20 July
15:00

Report

United Arab Emirates	50–94	Ukraine
Scoring by quarter: 11–20, 16–24, 10–25, 13–25

Xinzhuang Gymnasium, New Taipei City

20 July
17:00

Report

Strong Group Athletics (Philippines)	96–70	Republic of China White
Scoring by quarter: 30–15, 27–16, 23–23, 16–16

Xinzhuang Gymnasium, New Taipei City

20 July
19:00

Report

BSBL Guardians (Australia)	80–97	Republic of China Blue
Scoring by quarter: 19–23, 14–22, 27–32, 20–20

Xinzhuang Gymnasium, New Taipei City

==== Day 9 ====
21 July
13:00

Report

Malaysia	86–76	(Australia) BSBL Guardians
Scoring by quarter: 21–17, 23–21, 26–18, 16–20

Xinzhuang Gymnasium, New Taipei City

21 July
15:00

Report

Future Sports USA (United States)	78–82	Ukraine
Scoring by quarter: 21–20, 14–20, 23–16, 20–26

Xinzhuang Gymnasium, New Taipei City

21 July
17:00

Report

Republic of China White	80–75	Japan U22
Scoring by quarter: 22–19, 24–17, 18–24, 16–15

Xinzhuang Gymnasium, New Taipei City

21 July
19:00

Report

Republic of China Blue	79–83 (OT)	(Philippines) Strong Group Athletics
Scoring by quarter: 12–16, 22–25, 16–14, 23–18, Overtime: 6–10

Xinzhuang Gymnasium, New Taipei City

== Women's tournament ==
=== Participating teams ===
Team	Notes
Japan Universiade	FISU World University Games team
Malaysia	National teams
Philippines	National teams
Thailand	National teams
Republic of China Blue	National teams
Republic of China White	National teams

=== Team standings ===
Pos	Team	Pld	W	L	PF	PA	PD	Pts
1	Japan Universiade (C)	5	5	0	454	268	+186	10
2	Republic of China Blue	5	4	1	376	330	+46	9
3	Republic of China White (Note: Republic of China White 1–1, PD +12 Philippines 1–1, PD −3 Thailand 1–1, PD −9)	5	2	3	337	371	−34	7
4	Philippines	5	2	3	351	361	−10	7
5	Thailand	5	2	3	320	389	−69	7
6	Malaysia	5	0	5	261	380	−119	5

Source: William Jones Cup
(C) Champions

=== Games ===
==== Day 1 ====
6 July
15:00

Report

Malaysia	59–62 (OT)	Thailand
Scoring by quarter: 11–17, 16–10, 8–17, 14–5, Overtime: 10–13

Xinzhuang Gymnasium, New Taipei City

6 July
17:00

Report

Republic of China White	73–60	Philippines
Scoring by quarter: 16–15, 17–11, 18–17, 22–17

Xinzhuang Gymnasium, New Taipei City

6 July
19:30

Report

Republic of China Blue	46–97	Japan Universiade
Scoring by quarter: 11–23, 12–23, 11–27, 12–24

Xinzhuang Gymnasium, New Taipei City

==== Day 2 ====
7 July
15:00

Report

Philippines	74–63	Malaysia
Scoring by quarter: 19–12, 15–15, 24–14, 16–22

Xinzhuang Gymnasium, New Taipei City

7 July
17:00

Report

Japan Universiade	94–42	Republic of China White
Scoring by quarter: 27–8, 20–16, 21–7, 26–11

Xinzhuang Gymnasium, New Taipei City

7 July
19:00

Report

Thailand	60–92	Republic of China Blue
Scoring by quarter: 16–23, 16–27, 13–17, 15–25

Xinzhuang Gymnasium, New Taipei City

==== Day 3 ====
8 July
15:00

Record

Japan Universiade	85–83	Philippines
Scoring by quarter: 27–17, 21–20, 18–19, 19–27

Xinzhuang Gymnasium, New Taipei City

8 July
17:00

Report

Republic of China Blue	76–45	Malaysia
Scoring by quarter: 23–9, 14–11, 13–15, 26–10

Xinzhuang Gymnasium, New Taipei City

8 July
19:00

Report

Republic of China White	76–77	Thailand
Scoring by quarter: 16–23, 24–18, 21–21, 15–15

Xinzhuang Gymnasium, New Taipei City

==== Day 4 ====
9 July
15:00

Report

Philippines	68–58	Thailand
Scoring by quarter: 17–8, 10–16, 23–14, 18–20

Xinzhuang Gymnasium, New Taipei City

9 July
17:00

Report

Malaysia	34–84	Japan Universiade
Scoring by quarter: 12–22, 6–23, 8–9, 8–30

Xinzhuang Gymnasium, New Taipei City

9 July
19:00

Report

Republic of China White	62–80	Republic of China Blue
Scoring by quarter: 9–23, 18–21, 17–19, 18–17

Xinzhuang Gymnasium, New Taipei City

==== Day 5 ====
10 July
15:00

Report

Thailand	63–94	Japan Universiade
Scoring by quarter: 16–18, 21–19, 20–30, 5–27

Xinzhuang Gymnasium, New Taipei City

10 July
17:00

Report

Malaysia	60–84	Republic of China White
Scoring by quarter: 11–25, 17–22, 16–13, 16–24

Xinzhuang Gymnasium, New Taipei City

10 July
19:00

Report

Republic of China Blue	82–66	Philippines
Scoring by quarter: 26–10, 21–22, 15–17, 20–17

Xinzhuang Gymnasium, New Taipei City
