= Xinzhuang Gymnasium =

Indoor sports arena in New Taipei City, Taiwan

Coordinates: 25.0405°N 121.4520°E

Xinzhuang Gymnasium 新莊體育館
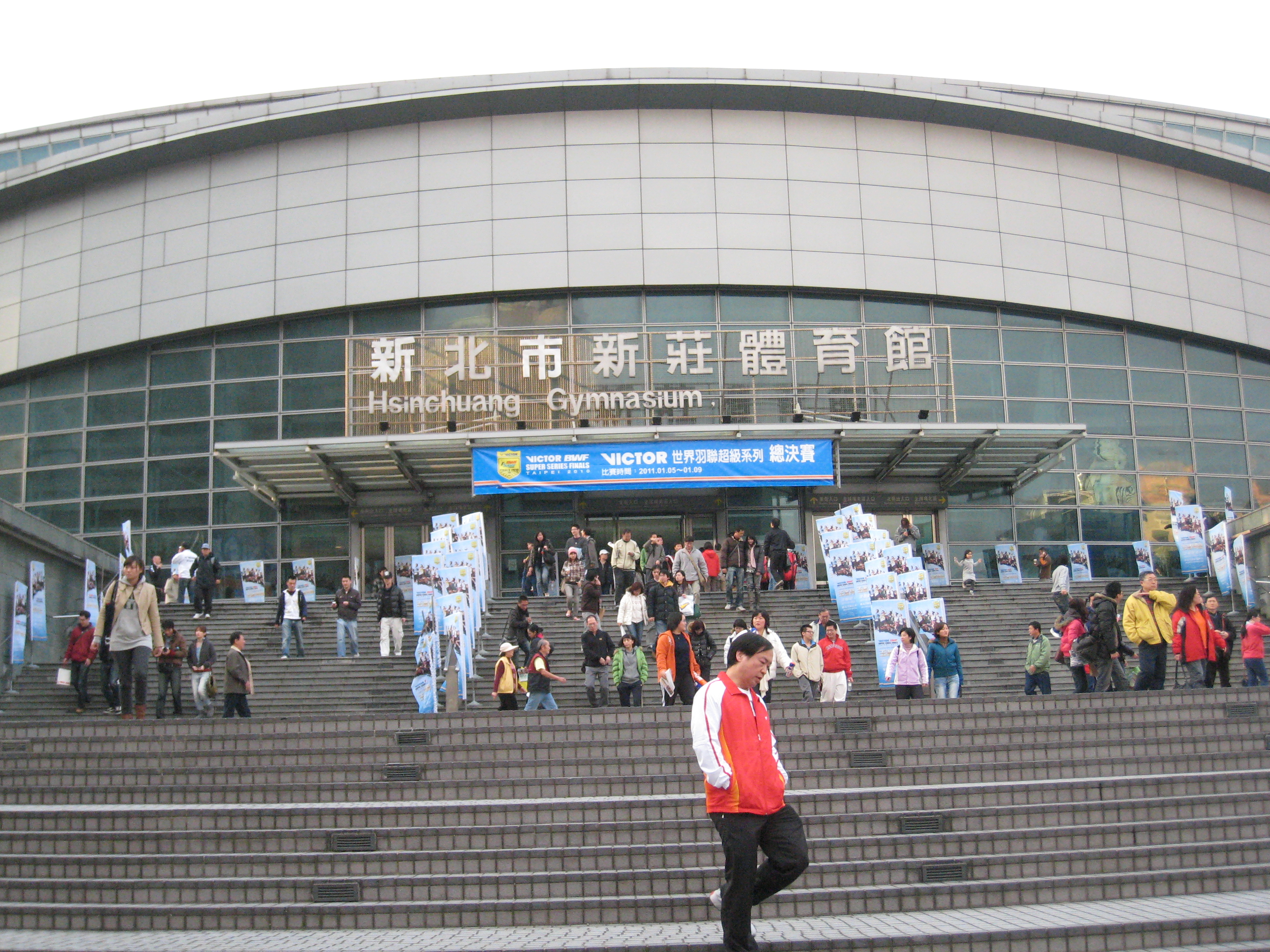
- Interactive map of Xinzhuang Gymnasium 新莊體育館
- Location: New Taipei City, Taiwan
- Capacity: 7,125
- Public transit: Taipei Metro: Xinzhuang

Construction
- Opened: April 2002

Tenants
- New Taipei CTBC DEA (T1/TPBL) (2021–present); New Taipei Kings (PLG/TPBL) (2021–present)

Xinzhuang Gymnasium (Chinese: 新莊體育館; pinyin: Xīnzhuāng Tǐyùguǎn, formerly romanizationed as Hsinchuang) is an indoor sporting arena located in New Taipei City, Taiwan. It was built from September 1999 until April 2002 by RSEA Engineering Corporation.

== Events ==
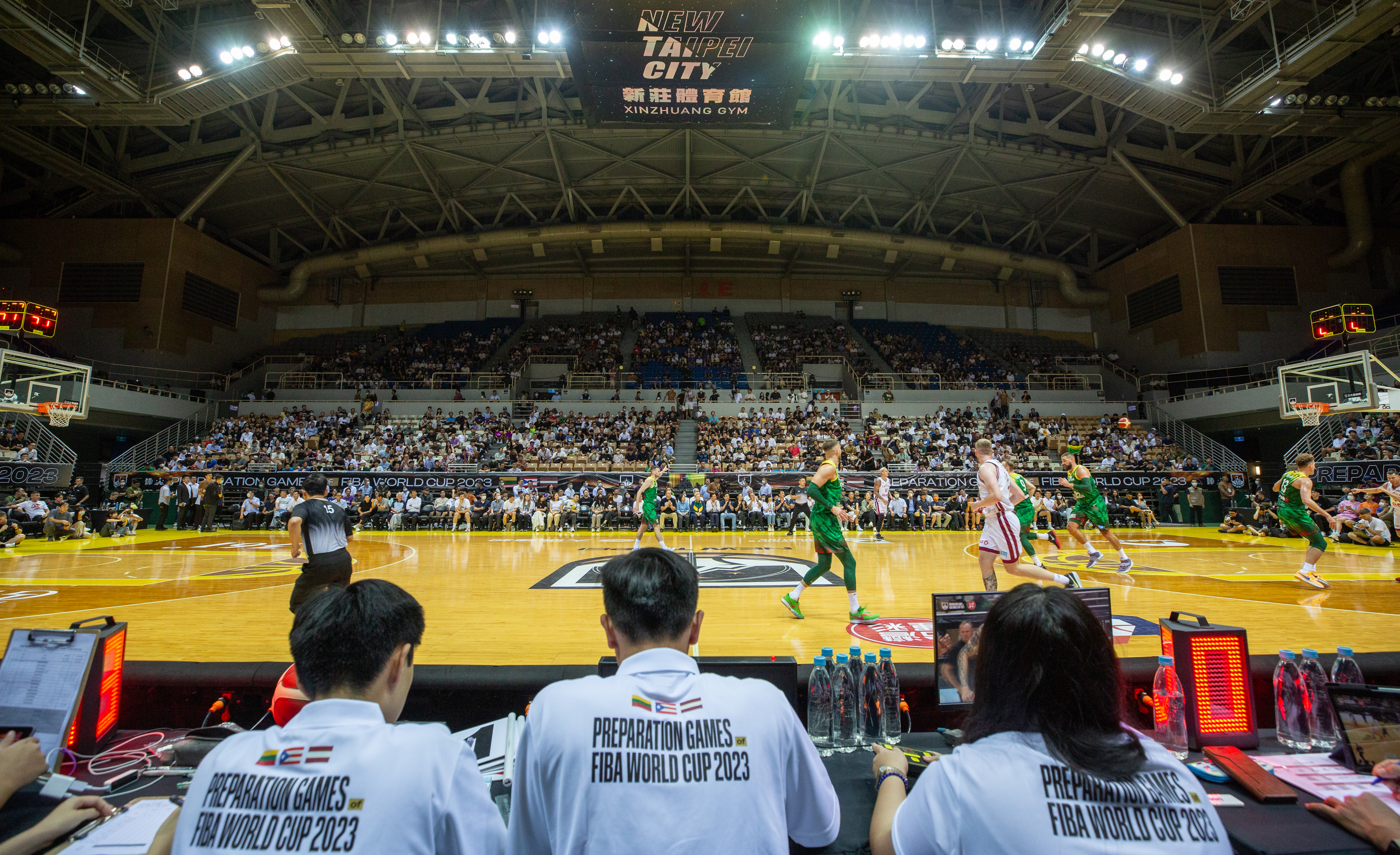
Interior

Xinzhuang Gymnasium has held many sporting events and concerts. It was also used during the 2009 Summer Deaflympics and the 2017 Summer Universiade. Its current tenants are professional basketball teams New Taipei CTBC DEA of T1 League, and New Taipei Kings of P. League+.

Sporting Events Hosted

- 2007 and 2008 FIVB Volleyball World Grand Prix
- 2009 Summer Deaflympics
- 2010 BWF Super Series Masters Finals
- 2017 Summer Universiade
- Chinese Taipei Open and Chinese Taipei Masters badminton tournaments
- William Jones Cup
- 2018 AFC Futsal Championship

Concerts Hosted

- Shinee World III
- Shinee World IV
- 2016 May 21–22 SpeXial Land
- 2016 BTS Live Hwa Yang Yeon Hwa On Stage: Epilogue
- 2017 TAEYEON Solo Concert "PERSONA"
- 2017 SEVENTEEN 1st World Tour: Diamond Edge.
- 2018 GFRIEND 1st Asia Tour: Season of GFRIEND
- 2018 SEVENTEEN Concert: IDEAL CUT
- Shinee World V
- 2018 MAMAMOO Concert 4 Seasons S/S
- 2019 MAMAMOO Concert 4 Seasons F/W
